= Lists of sovereign states and dependent territories =

This is a list of lists of countries and territories by various criteria. A country or territory is a geographical area, either in the sense of nation (a cultural entity) or state (a political entity).

== Demographics ==
=== Population ===
- List of countries and dependencies by population
- List of countries and dependencies by population (United Nations)
- List of countries and dependencies by population density
- List of countries by past and projected future population
- List of countries by past and projected future population density
- List of countries by English-speaking population
- List of countries by percentage of population living in poverty
- List of countries by population growth rate
- List of sovereign states by homeless population
- List of sovereign states by immigrant and emigrant population
- List of sovereign states by refugee population
- List of population milestones by country
- Population and housing censuses by country
- Urbanization by sovereign state

=== Life ===
- List of countries by age at first marriage
- List of countries by age structure
- List of countries by abortion rate
- List of countries by birth rate
- List of countries by dependency ratio
- List of countries by divorce rate
- List of countries by ethnic and cultural diversity level
- List of countries by ethnic groups
- List of countries by total fertility rate
- List of countries by past fertility rate
- List of countries by intentional death rate
- List of countries by life expectancy
- List of countries by past life expectancy
- List of countries by marriage rate
- List of countries by mean age at childbearing
- List of countries by median age
- List of countries by mortality rate
- List of countries by net migration rate
- List of countries by net reproduction rate
- List of countries by number of births
- List of countries by number of deaths
- List of countries by number of households
- List of countries by rate of natural increase
- List of countries by sex ratio

=== Health ===
- List of countries by access to clean water
- List of countries by access to improved sanitation facilities
- List of countries by antidepressant consumption
- List of countries by body mass index
- List of countries by cancer rate
- List of countries by health insurance coverage
- List of countries by hospital beds
- List of countries by infant and under-five mortality rates
- List of countries by maternal mortality ratio
- List of countries by number of physicians
- List of countries by obesity rate
- List of countries by risk of death from non-communicable disease
- List of countries by suicide rate
- List of countries by total health expenditure per capita
- List of countries by total health expenditure by type of financing
- Caregiving by country
- Health care systems by country
- Health spending as percent of gross domestic product (GDP) by country
- Universal health care by country

=== Religion ===
- Ahmadiyya by country
- Baháʼí Faith by country
- Buddhism by country
- Christianity by country
- Creationism by country
- Freedom of religion by country
- Hinduism by country
- Importance of religion by country
- Islam by country
- Jehovah's Witnesses by country
- Judaism by country
- List of countries by irreligion
- List of countries by Zoroastrian population
- List of Mormon missionary entries by country
- List of popes by country
- Religions by country
- Scientology status by country
- Sikhism by country

=== Language ===
- List of broadcasting languages by country
- List of countries by number of languages
- List of countries and dependencies and their capitals in native languages
- List of multilingual countries and regions
- List of official languages by country and territory
- Lists of countries and territories by official language
- Lists of English words by country or language of origin

== Economy ==
=== Economy ===
The production, distribution and consumption of goods and services:

- List of countries by charitable donation
- List of countries by exchange rate regime
- List of countries by household final consumption expenditure per capita
- List of countries by remittances received
- List of countries by social welfare spending
- List of countries by stock market capitalization
- List of countries without a stock exchange
- List of sovereign states by economic freedom
- List of sovereign states by male to female income ratio
- List of sovereign states by official development assistance received
- List of sovereign states by research and development spending
- List of nationalizations by country
- List of privatizations by country
- List of development aid sovereign state donors
- Human Development Index
  - List of countries by Human Development Index
  - List of countries by Human Development Index by region
  - List of countries by inequality-adjusted Human Development Index
  - List of countries by planetary pressures–adjusted Human Development Index

=== Finance ===
The study and discipline of money, currency and capital assets:

- List of countries by access to financial services
- List of countries by central bank interest rates
- List of countries by credit rating
- List of countries by corporate debt
- List of countries by external debt
- List of countries by foreign direct investment inflows
- List of countries by foreign direct investment outflows
- List of countries by foreign exchange reserves
- List of countries by government budget
- List of countries by government budget as percentage of GDP
- List of countries by government budget per capita
- List of countries by government debt
- List of countries by gross fixed capital formation
- List of countries by gross national savings
- List of countries by household debt
- List of countries by inflation rate
- List of countries by past gross government debt
- List of countries by price level
- List of countries by tax rates
- List of countries by tax revenue
- List of financial supervisory authorities by country
- Central bank digital currencies by country
- Consumer price index by country

=== Gross domestic product ===
The value of goods and services produced within a country:

- List of countries by GDP (nominal)
- List of countries by GDP (nominal) per capita
- List of countries by GDP (PPP)
- List of countries by GDP (PPP) per capita
- List of countries by GDP (PPP) per person employed
- List of countries by GDP sector composition
- List of countries by past and projected GDP (nominal)
- List of countries by past and projected GDP (nominal) per capita
- List of countries by past and projected GDP (PPP)
- List of countries by past and projected GDP (PPP) per capita
- List of countries by past GDP growth
- List of countries by largest historical GDP
- List of countries by real GDP growth rate
- List of countries by real GDP per capita growth
- List of countries by GNI (nominal) per capita
- List of countries by GNI (PPP) per capita
- List of countries by GNI per capita growth

=== Industrial output ===
The production of raw materials, goods, and services:

- List of countries by aluminium exports
- List of countries by bentonite production
- List of countries by copper exports
- List of countries by diamond exports
- List of countries by diamond production
- List of countries by feldspar production
- List of countries by fluorite production
- List of countries by gold exports
- List of countries by industrial production growth rate
- List of countries by iron-ore exports
- List of countries by lithium production
- List of countries by palladium production
- List of countries by past cement production
- List of countries by salt production
- List of countries by silicon production
- List of countries by steel production
- Lists of countries by mineral production
- Deindustrialisation by country
- Magnesium production by country
- Manganese production by country
- Titanium production by country

=== Product exports ===
- List of countries by aircraft and spacecraft exports
- List of countries by aircraft component exports
- List of countries by automotive component exports
- List of countries by computer exports
- List of countries by electronics exports
- List of countries by engine exports
- List of countries by gas turbine exports
- List of countries by integrated circuit exports
- List of countries by live animal exports
- List of countries by pharmaceutical exports
- List of countries by raw cotton exports
- List of countries by semiconductor exports
- List of countries by ship exports
- List of countries by telecommunications equipment exports
- List of countries by telephone exports
- List of countries by textile exports
- List of countries by truck exports
- List of countries by vehicle exports

=== Trade and wealth ===
- List of countries by current account balance
- List of countries by exports
- List of countries by exports per capita
- List of countries by financial assets
- List of countries by imports
- List of countries by income inequality
- List of countries by inequality-adjusted income
- List of countries by leading trade partners
- List of countries by merchandise exports
- List of countries by net goods exports
- List of countries by number of billionaires
- List of countries by number of millionaires
- List of countries by service exports and imports
- List of countries by tariff rate
- List of countries by total private wealth
- List of countries by trade-to-GDP ratio
- List of countries by wealth per adult
- List of sovereign states by wealth inequality
- List of sovereign wealth funds by country
- List of top exporting countries by category
- Wealth distribution by country

=== Workforce ===
- List of countries by average annual labor hours
- List of countries by average wage
- List of countries by child labour rate
- List of countries by employment in agriculture
- List of countries by informal employment rate
- List of countries by labour force
- List of countries by labour productivity
- List of countries by long-term unemployment rate
- List of countries by minimum wage
- List of countries by public sector size
- List of countries by rate of fatal workplace accidents
- List of countries by sector composition of the labor force
- List of countries by time devoted to leisure and personal care
- List of countries by unemployment rate
- List of sovereign states by employment rate
- List of minimum annual leave by country

== Energy ==
=== Fossil fuels ===
- List of countries by coal production
- List of countries by coal reserves
- List of countries by natural gas consumption
- List of countries by natural gas exports
- List of countries by natural gas imports
- List of countries by natural gas production
- List of countries by natural gas proven reserves
- List of countries by oil consumption
- List of countries by oil exports
- List of countries by oil extraction
- List of countries by oil imports
- List of countries by proven oil reserves
- List of countries by recoverable shale gas
- List of countries by refined petroleum exports
- Fracking by country
- Natural gas by country
- Shale gas by country
- Oil by country

=== Other ===
- List of countries by electricity consumption
- List of countries by electricity production
- List of countries by electrification rate
- List of countries by energy consumption and production
- List of countries by energy consumption per capita
- List of countries by energy intensity
- List of countries by renewable electricity production
- List of countries by thorium resources
- List of countries by uranium production
- List of countries by uranium reserves
- List of nuclear and radiation fatalities by country
- List of nuclear power accidents by country
- List of renewable energy topics by country
- Electricity by country
- Electricity distribution companies by country
- Ethanol fuel by country
- Mains electricity by country
- Nuclear energy policy by country
- Nuclear power by country
- Wind power by country
- Solar power by country
- Smart grids by country
- Uranium mining by country

== Agriculture ==
- Fishing industry by country
- Land reforms by country
- Land use statistics by country
- List of countries with organic agriculture regulation
- List of countries by agricultural exports
- List of countries by arable land density
- List of countries by irrigated land area
- List of countries by organic farmland
- List of countries by apple production
- List of countries by apricot production
- List of countries by artichoke production
- List of countries by avocado production
- List of countries by barley production
- List of countries by cereal production
- List of countries by cherry production
- List of countries by coconut production
- List of countries by coffee production
- List of countries by corn production
- List of countries by cucumber production
- List of countries by eggplant production
- List of countries by fruit production
- List of countries by garlic production
- List of countries by grape production
- List of countries by meat production
- List of countries by milk production
- List of countries by papaya production
- List of countries by pear production
- List of countries by pineapple production
- List of countries by plum production
- List of countries by potato production
- List of countries by rice production
- List of countries by soybean production
- List of countries by tomato production
- List of countries by vegetable production
- List of countries by wheat production
- List of largest producing countries of agricultural commodities
- List of wine-producing regions

== Built environment ==
Human-made space in which people live, work and recreate on a daily basis:

- List of archaeoastronomical sites by country
- List of archaeological sites by country
- List of aquaria by country
- List of canals by country
- List of castles by country
- Lists of cities by country
- List of countries whose capital is not their largest city
- List of countries with multiple capitals
- List of countries with the most skyscrapers
- List of ghost towns by country
- List of highest towns by country
- List of libraries by country
- List of museums by country
- List of tallest buildings by country
- List of tallest structures by country
- List of tunnels by country
- List of zoos by country
- List of national capitals

== Country codes ==
- List of telephone country codes
- List of country codes on British diplomatic vehicle registration plates
- List of CGF country codes
- List of FIFA country codes
- List of FIPS country codes
- List of GS1 country codes
- List of IOC country codes
- List of ISO 3166 country codes
- List of ITU letter codes
- List of NATO country codes
- List of UIC country code
- List of UNDP country codes
- Maritime identification digits
- Mobile country code
- International vehicle registration code

== Crime ==
The unlawful acts punishable by a state or other authority:

- List of countries by firearm-related death rate
- List of countries by incarceration rate
- List of countries by intentional homicide rate
- List of countries by guns and homicide
- List of countries and dependencies by number of police officers
- List of countries that regulate the immigration of felons
- List of countries with annual rates and counts for killings by law enforcement officers
- List of serial killers by country
- Allegations of apartheid by country
- Capital punishment by country
- Number of terrorist incidents by country
- Police brutality by country
- Police firearm use by country
- Prisons by country

== Drugs and alcohol ==
- List of countries by alcohol consumption per capita
- List of countries by annual cannabis use
- List of countries by beer consumption per capita
- List of countries by prevalence of cocaine use
- List of countries by prevalence of opiates use
- List of countries with alcohol prohibition
- Adult lifetime cannabis use by country
- Drug and precursor laws by country or territory
- Legal status of ayahuasca by country
- Legal status of ibogaine by country
- Legal status of psychoactive cactus by country
- Moonshine by country

== Education ==
The transmission of knowledge and skills:

- List of countries by literacy rate
- List of countries by youth literacy rate
- List of countries by secondary education attainment
- List of countries by tertiary education attainment
- List of countries by public spending in tertiary education
- List of countries by Nobel laureates per capita
- List of countries by number of doctorates awarded
- List of countries by spending on education as percentage of GDP
- List of countries by spending on education as percentage of government spending
- List of countries by median years of schooling
- List of doctoral degrees awarded by country
- List of education articles by country
- List of Nobel laureates by country
- List of normal schools by country
- Lists of schools by country
- List of primary education systems by country
- List of secondary education systems by country
- Lists of universities and colleges by country
- Grading systems by country
- School uniforms by country

== Entertainment ==
The activities that holds the attention and interest of an audience or gives pleasure and delight:

- Lists of actors by country
- List of countries by number of Academy Awards for Best International Feature Film
- List of countries in the Eurovision Song Contest
- List of countries in the Eurovision Young Dancers
- List of countries in the Eurovision Young Musicians
- List of countries in the Junior Eurovision Song Contest
- List of banned video games by country
- List of best-selling albums by country
- List of comics by country
- List of Grammy Award winners and nominees by country
- Lists of Hispanic Academy Award winners and nominees by country
- List of the first films by country
- List of video games markets by country
- Literature by country
- Lotteries by country

== Environment ==
The physical, chemical, and biotic factors that act upon an ecosystem:

- List of countries by air pollution
- List of countries by carbon dioxide emissions
- List of countries by carbon dioxide emissions per capita
- List of countries by carbon intensity
- List of countries by ecological footprint
- List of countries by greenhouse gas emissions
- List of countries by greenhouse gas emissions per capita
- List of countries by natural disaster risk
- Lists of ecoregions by country
- List of environmental laws by country
- List of water supply and sanitation by country

== Food and drink ==
- List of countries by food energy intake
- List of countries by food self-sufficiency rate
- List of countries by meat consumption
- List of countries by milk consumption per capita
- List of countries by seafood consumption
- List of countries by tea consumption per capita
- List of countries with Burger King franchises
- List of countries with McDonald's restaurants
- List of countries with KFC franchises
- List of countries with Jollibee outlets
- List of pizza varieties by country
- List of snack foods by country
- List of soft drinks by country
- Breakfast by country
- Food deserts by country
- Krispy Kreme operations by country
- Operations of KFC by country
- Right to food by country
- Vegetarianism by country

== Geography ==
Earth and its features:

- List of countries and dependencies by area
- List of countries bordering on two or more oceans
- List of countries by average annual precipitation
- List of countries by average elevation
- List of countries by average yearly temperature
- List of countries by forest area
- List of countries by length of coastline
- List of countries by total renewable water resources
- List of countries by largest island
- List of countries by number of islands
- List of countries that border only one other country
- List of countries without rivers
- List of countries and territories bordering the Atlantic Ocean
- List of countries and territories by number of land borders
- List of countries and territories by land and maritime borders
- List of countries and territories by maritime boundaries
- List of countries and territories by the United Nations geoscheme
- List of sovereign states and dependent territories by continent
- List of sovereign states by freshwater withdrawal
- List of administrative divisions by country
- List of autonomous areas by country
- List of elevation extremes by country
- List of island countries
- List of landlocked countries
- List of former transcontinental countries
- List of time zones by country
- Daylight saving time by country

== History ==
The systematic study of the past:

- List of adoption dates of the Gregorian calendar by country
- List of countries by date of transition to a republican system of government
- List of countries that have gained independence from Spain
- List of countries that have gained independence from the United Kingdom
- List of coups and coup attempts by country
- List of former sovereign states
- List of first female dentists by country
- List of first female pharmacists by country
- List of first female physicians by country
- List of first satellites by country
- List of sovereign states by date of current flag adoption
- List of sovereign states by date of formation
- List of the first female members of parliament by country
- History by country
- History of anthropology by country

== Laws ==
The set of rules that are created and enforced to regulate behaviour:

- Animal rights by country or territory
- Ages of consent by country
- Beard and haircut laws by country
- Bicycle helmet laws by country
- Clothing laws by country
- Divorce law by country
- Drunk driving law by country
- Email spam legislation by country
- Female genital mutilation laws by country
- Freedom of information laws by country
- Hate speech laws by country
- Law enforcement by country
- Laws protecting monuments by country
- Legal industry by country
- Legal status of human sterilization by country
- Legality of cryptocurrency by country or territory
- LGBTQ rights by country or territory
- List of copyright duration by country
- List of countries that prohibit camouflage clothing
- List of legal entity types by country
- List of legislatures by country
- List of murder laws by country
- List of national constitutions
- List of supreme courts by country
- Marital rape laws by country
- Net neutrality by country
- Sperm donation laws by country
- Surrogacy laws by country

== Mass media ==
- List of countries by 4G LTE penetration
- List of countries by IPv4 address allocation
- List of countries by mobile banking usage
- List of countries by number of Internet users
- List of countries by number of mobile phones in use
- List of countries by number of scientific and technical journal articles
- List of countries by number of telephone lines in use
- List of countries by number of television broadcast stations
- List of countries by smartphone penetration
- List of countries by stem cell research trials
- List of sovereign states by Internet connection speeds
- List of sovereign states by number of broadband Internet subscriptions
- List of sovereign states by number of Internet hosts
- List of mobile phone brands by country
- List of public broadcasters by country
- List of state media by country
- List of television networks by country
- Internet censorship and surveillance by country
- TV advertisements by country
- Books published per country per year

== Military ==
- List of countries by Global Militarization Index
- List of countries by level of military equipment
- List of countries by number of military and paramilitary personnel
- List of countries by number of United Nations peacekeepers contributed
- List of countries by past military expenditure
- List of countries that prohibit paramilitary organizations outside government armed forces
- List of countries with highest military expenditures
- List of countries with highest military expenditure per capita
- List of countries with overseas military bases
- List of sovereign states without armed forces
- List of enlistment age by country
- List of armies by country
- List of artillery by country
- Lists of currently active military equipment by country
- List of main battle tanks by country
- List of militaries by country
- List of military unit mottoes by country
- List of missiles by country
- List of naval guns by country
- List of seaplane carriers by country
- Military history by country
- Missile defense systems by country
- Sexual orientation and military service by country
- Women in the military by country

== Names and symbols ==
The label for the country and the representation of a country's identity and values:

- List of sovereign states
- List of alternative country names
- List of countries named after people
- List of countries that have the same national anthem
- List of countries that include United States in their name
- List of country-name etymologies
- List of flags by color
- List of flags by color combination
- List of national animals
- List of national anthems
- List of national birds
- List of national dances
- List of national drinks
- List of national flags of sovereign states
- List of national flowers
- List of national founders
- List of national fruits
- List of national instruments (music)
- List of national liquors
- List of national mottos
- List of national trees
- Armorial of sovereign states
- National poet

== Politics ==
The process by which groups, often governments, make decisions:

- List of countries by consultation on rule-making
- List of countries by federal system
- List of countries by Fragile States Index
- List of countries by number of diplomatic missions
- List of countries by system of government
- List of countries with coalition governments
- List of countries without political parties
- List of electoral systems by country
- List of fascist movements by country
- Lists of mayors by country
- List of micronations
- List of national governments
- List of ruling political parties by country
- List of the most recent elections by country
- Apportionment by country
- Censorship by country
- Democratic backsliding by country
- Elections by country
- Electronic voting by country
- Freedom of speech by country
- Liberal parties by country
- Referendums by country

== Sports ==
- List of countries with their first Major League Baseball player
- List of association football stadiums by country
- List of first Olympic gold medalists by country
- List of Grand Slam singles champions by country
- List of Open Era Grand Slam champions by country
- List of rugby union players by country
- List of top international men's football goalscorers by country
- List of top international women's football goalscorers by country
- Ice hockey by country
- Incentives for Olympic medalists by country
- Judo by country

== Transport ==
The intentional movement of humans, animals, and goods from one location to another:

- List of countries by container port traffic
- List of countries by motor vehicle production
- List of countries by number of heliports
- List of countries by rail transport network size
- List of countries by rail usage
- List of countries by road network size
- List of countries by total length of pipelines
- List of countries by traffic-related death rate
- List of countries by vehicles per capita
- List of countries by waterways length
- List of countries without an airport
- List of current automobile manufacturers by country
- List of highest railways by country
- List of international airports by country
- List of merchant navy capacity by country
- List of rotorcraft manufacturers by country
- Lists of rail accidents by country
- Automotive industry by country
- Electric car use by country
- Highway systems by country
- Level crossings by country
- Rail transport by country
- Railway coupling by country
- School buses by country
- Speed limits by country
- Taxis by country
- Traffic signs by country
- Trolleybus usage by country

== Miscellaneous ==
- List of African writers by country
- List of countries by number of public holidays
- List of countries that have used postal orders
- List of countries with United Nations Associations
- List of date formats by country
- List of department stores by country
- List of fictional countries set on Earth
- List of frigate classes by country
- Lists of holidays by country
- List of national identity card policies by country
- List of Protected Designation of Origin products by country
- List of Righteous Among the Nations by country
- List of Scout Laws by country
- List of the oldest people by country
- List of traditional specialities guaranteed by country
- List of women innovators and inventors by country
- 2009 swine flu pandemic by country
- Affordable housing by country
- Average human height by country
- Blood type distribution by country
- COVID-19 lockdowns by country
- COVID-19 pandemic by country and territory
- COVID-19 pandemic death rates by country
- Child support by country
- Civil defense by country
- Cremation by country
- Date and time representation by country
- Department stores by country
- Desalination by country
- Electronic waste by country
- Emergency contraceptive availability by country
- Equinor operations by country
- Estimated number of civilian guns per capita by country
- Immigration by country
- Involuntary commitment by country
- Number of gray wolves by country
- Observance of Christmas by country
- Percent of households with guns by country
- Prostitution statistics by country
- Racism by country
- Regional organisations by country
- Surnames by country
- Timeline of first orbital launches by country
- Waste by country
- Water fluoridation by country
- Wedding customs by country
- World Heritage Sites by country
- World War II by country
