= List of population milestones by country =

Note: The sources and years from 1810 to 2100 come from this video: When more than 20 countries reach a milestone, such as the 50 million milestone, the sources come from this video: Any country which reached a given milestone before 1800 has its sources come from this video:

This is a list of population milestones by country (and year first reached). Only existing countries are included, not former countries.

== 20 million milestone ==
1. India: Unknown, most likely 2000 B.C.
2. China: 450 B.C., most likely 1000 B.C.
3. Greece: 400 B.C.
4. Italy: 60 B.C.
5. Turkey: 400
6. France: 1100
7. Iran: Unknown, most likely 480 B.C.
8. Mali: 1400
9. Mexico: Unknown, most likely 1250
10. Peru: 1500
11. Russia: 1765
12. Germany: 1770, most likely 1250
13. Japan: 1815, most likely 1629
14. Bangladesh: 1818
15. United Kingdom: 1837
16. Indonesia: 1840
17. Pakistan: 1843, most likely 1913
18. United States: 1844
19. Poland: 1882
20. Ukraine: 1883
21. Brazil: 1905, most likely 1500
22. Spain: 1911
23. Vietnam: 1930
24. Nigeria: 1933
25. Thailand: 1949
26. Egypt: 1949
27. Philippines: 1953
28. South Korea: 1953
29. Ethiopia: 1956
30. Myanmar: 1957
31. Argentina: 1959
32. Canada: 1967
33. South Africa: 1967
34. Colombia: 1968
35. Romania: 1968
36. DR Congo: 1971
37. Morocco: 1981
38. Algeria: 1982
39. Tanzania: 1983
40. Kenya: 1986
41. North Korea: 1990
42. Uzbekistan: 1990
43. Sudan: 1990
44. Venezuela: 1991
45. Nepal: 1993
46. Malaysia: 1995
47. Uganda: 1995
48. Iraq: 1995
49. Saudi Arabia: 1999
50. Afghanistan: 1999
51. Ghana: 2002
52. Mozambique: 2005
53. Australia: 2005
54. Yemen: 2005
55. Angola: 2006
56. Syria: 2008
57. Madagascar: 2009
58. Sri Lanka: 2009
59. Ivory Coast: 2009
60. Cameroon: 2010
61. Niger: 2016
62. Burkina Faso: 2019
63. Mali: 2020
64. Malawi: 2022
65. Kazakhstan: 2023
66. Zambia: 2024
67. Guatemala: 2027 (est.)
68. Senegal: 2028 (est.)
69. Chad: 2028 (est.)
70. Somalia: 2028 (est.)
71. Ecuador: 2031 (est.)
72. Chile: 2037 (est.)
73. Cambodia: 2037 (est.)
74. Guinea: 2038 (est.)
75. Zimbabwe: 2038 (est.)
76. Burundi: 2040 (est.)
77. Benin: 2041 (est.)
78. Rwanda: 2042 (est.)
79. South Sudan: 2051 (est.)
80. Netherlands: 2059 (est.)
81. Tajikistan: 2068 (est.)
82. Togo: 2068 (est.)
83. Congo: 2095 (est.)
84. Papua New Guinea: 2100 (est.)

== 25 million milestone ==
1. India: 450 B.C., most likely 1667 B.C.
2. China: 350 B.C., most likely 737 B.C.
3. France: 1163
4. Mexico: 1495, most likely 1925
5. Japan: 1680, most likely 1800
6. Russia: 1786
7. Germany: 1818
8. United States: 1852
9. Italy: 1854
10. United Kingdom: 1861
11. Indonesia: 1863
12. Bangladesh: 1873
13. Poland: 1902
14. Ukraine: 1907
15. Brazil: 1916
16. Pakistan: 1934
17. Spain: 1937
18. Nigeria: 1939
19. Vietnam: 1951
20. Turkey: 1957
21. Thailand: 1957
22. Egypt: 1958
23. Philippines: 1959
24. South Korea: 1960
25. Ethiopia: 1966
26. Iran: 1966
27. Myanmar: 1967
28. Argentina: 1973
29. South Africa: 1975
30. Colombia: 1977
31. DR Congo: 1979
32. Canada: 1983
33. Algeria: 1989
34. Tanzania: 1990
35. Morocco: 1991
36. Kenya: 1992
37. Sudan: 1997
38. Peru: 1997
39. Uzbekistan: 2001
40. Venezuela: 2002
41. Uganda: 2002
42. Iraq: 2003
43. Nepal: 2003
44. Malaysia: 2004
45. Afghanistan: 2005
46. Saudi Arabia: 2007
47. Ghana: 2011
48. Angola: 2012
49. Mozambique: 2013
50. Yemen: 2013
51. North Korea: 2014
52. Madagascar: 2017
53. Cameroon: 2018
54. Ivory Coast: 2019
55. Australia: 2019
56. Niger: 2021
57. Burkina Faso: 2027 (est.)
58. Syria: 2028 (est.)
59. Mali: 2028 (est.)
60. Malawi: 2031 (est.)
61. Zambia: 2032 (est.)
62. Chad: 2036 (est.)
63. Somalia: 2037 (est.)
64. Senegal: 2037 (est.)
65. Guatemala: 2043 (est.)
66. Guinea: 2048 (est.)
67. Burundi: 2050 (est.)
68. Benin: 2052 (est.)
69. Zimbabwe: 2054 (est.)
70. Rwanda: 2057 (est.)
71. Kazakhstan: 2058 (est.)
72. South Sudan: 2067 (est.)
73. Ecuador: 2070 (est.)
74. Togo: 2090 (est.)
75. Tajikistan: 2097 (est.)

== 30 million milestone ==
1. India: Unknown, most likely 1442 B.C.
2. China: Unknown, most likely 629 B.C.
3. Japan: 1788
4. Russia: 1791
5. France: 1809
6. Germany: 1837
7. United States: 1858
8. United Kingdom: 1878
9. Indonesia: 1880
10. Italy: 1883
11. Bangladesh: 1905
12. Brazil: 1925
13. Ukraine: 1927
14. Poland: 1935
15. Pakistan: 1943
16. Nigeria: 1944
17. Mexico: 1953
18. Vietnam: 1958
19. Spain: 1959
20. Thailand: 1964
21. Turkey: 1964
22. Philippines: 1965
23. Egypt: 1965
24. South Korea: 1967
25. Ethiopia: 1972
26. Iran: 1972
27. Myanmar: 1975
28. South Africa: 1982
29. Argentina: 1985
30. Colombia: 1986
31. DR Congo: 1986
32. Tanzania: 1996
33. Algeria: 1998
34. Kenya: 1998
35. Canada: 1998
36. Morocco: 2004
37. Sudan: 2004
38. Uganda: 2008
39. Iraq: 2011
40. Afghanistan: 2011
41. Saudi Arabia: 2014
42. Uzbekistan: 2014
43. Peru: 2014
44. Venezuela: 2014
45. Malaysia: 2015
46. Angola: 2018
47. Ghana: 2019
48. Mozambique: 2019
49. Yemen: 2021
50. Nepal: 2022
51. Madagascar: 2024
52. Cameroon: 2026 (est.)
53. Ivory Coast: 2026 (est.)
54. Niger: 2025 (est.)
55. Burkina Faso: 2034 (est.)
56. Mali: 2035 (est.)
57. Australia: 2038 (est.)
58. Malawi: 2039 (est.)
59. Zambia: 2039 (est.)
60. Syria: 2040 (est.)
61. Somalia: 2044 (est.)
62. Chad: 2044 (est.)
63. Senegal: 2045 (est.)
64. Guinea: 2059 (est.)
65. Burundi: 2059 (est.)
66. Benin: 2062 (est.)
67. Guatemala: 2066 (est.)
68. Rwanda: 2076 (est.)
69. Zimbabwe: 2080 (est.)
70. South Sudan: 2089 (est.)

== 35 million milestone ==
1. India: Unknown, most likely 1200 B.C.
2. China: Unknown, most likely 600 B.C.
3. Russia: 1839
4. France: 1842
5. Germany: 1855
6. United States: 1864
7. Japan: 1873
8. United Kingdom: 1892
9. Indonesia: 1893
10. Italy: 1912
11. Bangladesh: 1924
12. Brazil: 1924
13. Poland: 1939
14. Nigeria: 1946
15. Ukraine: 1946
16. Pakistan: 1947
17. Mexico: 1958
18. Vietnam: 1963
19. Thailand: 1969
20. Philippines: 1970
21. Turkey: 1971
22. Egypt: 1971
23. Spain: 1973
24. South Korea: 1975
25. Iran: 1978
26. Poland: 1979 (reached the milestone for the first time in 1939)
27. Ethiopia: 1980
28. Myanmar: 1982
29. South Africa: 1991
30. Colombia: 1994
31. Argentina: 1996
32. Tanzania: 2002
33. Kenya: 2004
34. Algeria: 2009
35. Sudan: 2011
36. Morocco: 2011
37. Canada: 2013
38. Uganda: 2013
39. Iraq: 2015
40. Afghanistan: 2016
41. Saudi Arabia: 2021
42. Angola: 2023
43. Uzbekistan: 2024
44. Mozambique: 2025 (est.)
45. Ghana: 2027 (est.)
46. Peru: 2027 (est.)
47. Malaysia: 2028 (est.)
48. Yemen: 2028 (est.)
49. Niger: 2029 (est.)
50. Madagascar: 2030 (est.)
51. Cameroon: 2032 (est.)
52. Ivory Coast: 2032 (est.)
53. Venezuela: 2036 (est.)
54. Burkina Faso: 2041 (est.)
55. Mali: 2041 (est.)
56. Nepal: 2042 (est.)
57. Zambia: 2045 (est.)
58. Malawi: 2046 (est.)
59. Somalia: 2051 (est.)
60. Chad: 2052 (est.)
61. Senegal: 2054 (est.)
62. Syria: 2059 (est.)
63. Australia: 2061 (est.)
64. Burundi: 2069 (est.)
65. Guinea: 2070 (est.)
66. Benin: 2073 (est.)

== 40 million milestone ==
1. India: 200 B.C., most likely 950 B.C.
2. China: 100 B.C., most likely 1002 A.D.
3. Russia: 1848
4. United States: 1870
5. Germany: 1871
6. France: 1890
7. Japan: 1890
8. Indonesia: 1904
9. United Kingdom: 1906
10. Italy: 1928
11. Brazil: 1939
12. Bangladesh: 1953
13. Nigeria: 1954
14. Pakistan: 1955
15. Ukraine: 1955
16. Mexico: 1962
17. Vietnam: 1967
18. Thailand: 1973
19. Philippines: 1974
20. Turkey: 1976
21. Egypt: 1977
22. Iran: 1981
23. South Korea: 1984
24. Ethiopia: 1985
25. Myanmar: 1988
26. South Africa: 1994
27. DR Congo: 1994
28. Spain: 1997
29. Colombia: 2001
30. Tanzania: 2007
31. Argentina: 2008
32. Kenya: 2009
33. Algeria: 2016
34. Sudan: 2017
35. Uganda: 2017
36. Iraq: 2020
37. Afghanistan: 2022
38. Canada: 2023
39. Morocco: 2023 (est.)
40. Angola: 2027 (est.)
41. Mozambique: 2029 (est.)
42. Saudi Arabia: 2032 (est.)
43. Niger: 2032 (est.)
44. Ghana: 2034 (est.)
45. Madagascar: 2036 (est.)
46. Yemen: 2036 (est.)
47. Ivory Coast: 2038 (est.)
48. Cameroon: 2038 (est.)
49. Uzbekistan: 2039 (est.)
50. Mali: 2046 (est.)
51. Burkina Faso: 2047 (est.)
52. Malaysia: 2047 (est.)
53. Peru: 2048 (est.)
54. Zambia: 2052 (est.)
55. Malawi: 2053 (est.)
56. Somalia: 2057 (est.)
57. Chad: 2060 (est.)
58. Senegal: 2061 (est.)
59. Burundi: 2078 (est.)
60. Guinea: 2083 (est.)
61. Benin: 2083 (est.)
62. Australia: 2086 (est.)

== 45 million milestone ==
1. India: Unknown, most likely 900 B.C.
2. China: Unknown, most likely 1010 A.D.
3. Russia: 1861
4. United States: 1875
5. Germany: 1884
6. Japan: 1902
7. Indonesia: 1915
8. United Kingdom: 1925
9. Italy: 1943
10. Brazil: 1944
11. Bangladesh: 1959
12. France: 1959
13. Nigeria: 1961
14. Pakistan: 1961
15. Ukraine: 1966
16. Mexico: 1966
17. Vietnam: 1972
18. Thailand: 1979
19. Philippines: 1979
20. Egypt: 1981
21. Turkey: 1982
22. Iran: 1984
23. Ethiopia: 1989
24. South Korea: 1995
25. Myanmar: 1998
26. DR Congo: 1999
27. South Africa: 2001
28. Spain: 2007
29. Colombia: 2010
30. Tanzania: 2011
31. Kenya: 2015
32. Uganda: 2020
33. Argentina: 2020
34. Sudan: 2022
35. Algeria: 2022
36. Iraq: 2025
37. Afghanistan: 2027 (est.)
38. Angola: 2031 (est.)
39. Mozambique: 2034 (est.)
40. Niger: 2038 (est.)
41. Ghana: 2041 (est.)
42. Madagascar: 2041 (est.)
43. Ivory Coast: 2044 (est.)
44. Cameroon: 2044 (est.)
45. Yemen: 2045 (est.)
46. Morocco: 2045 (est.)
47. Canada: 2047 (est.)
48. Mali: 2052 (est.)
49. Burkina Faso: 2052 (est.)
50. Saudi Arabia: 2054 (est.)
51. Zambia: 2058 (est.)
52. Malawi: 2061 (est.)
53. Mali: 2052 (est.)
54. Somalia: 2063 (est.)
55. Chad: 2068 (est.)
56. Senegal: 2069 (est.)
57. Burundi: 2088 (est.)
58. Benin: 2095 (est.)
59. Guinea: 2100 (est.)

== 50 million milestone ==
1. India: Unknown, most likely 727 B.C.
2. China: Unknown, most likely 147 B.C.
3. Russia: 1872
4. United States: 1879
5. Germany: 1893
6. Japan: 1911
7. Indonesia: 1925
8. United Kingdom: 1948
9. Brazil: 1948
10. Italy: 1961
11. Bangladesh: 1962
12. Pakistan: 1965
13. Nigeria: 1965
14. France: 1968
15. Mexico: 1969
16. Vietnam: 1977
17. Ukraine: 1981
18. Philippines: 1982
19. Thailand: 1983
20. Egypt: 1985
21. Turkey: 1986
22. Iran: 1987
23. Ethiopia: 1992
24. DR Congo: 2003
25. Myanmar: 2009
26. South Africa: 2009
27. South Korea: 2012
28. Tanzania: 2015
29. Kenya: 2017
30. Colombia: 2019
31. Uganda: 2024
32. Sudan: 2026
33. Algeria: 2030 (est.)
34. Iraq: 2030 (est.)
35. Afghanistan: 2033 (est.)
36. Argentina: 2033 (est.)
37. Angola: 2034 (est.)
38. Mozambique: 2038 (est.)
39. Niger: 2038 (est.)
40. Madagascar: 2044 (est.)
41. Ghana: 2048 (est.)
42. Ivory Coast: 2049 (est.)
43. Cameroon: 2050 (est.)
44. Yemen: 2055 (est.)
45. Mali: 2058 (est.)
46. Burkina Faso: 2058 (est.)
47. Zambia: 2063 (est.)
48. Malawi: 2068 (est.)
49. Morocco: 2069 (est.)
50. Somalia: 2069 (est.)
51. Canada: 2070 (est.)
52. Chad: 2076 (est.)
53. Senegal: 2077 (est.)
54. Burundi: 2098 (est.)

== 60 million milestone ==
1. India: Unknown, most likely 393 B.C.
2. China: Unknown, most likely 1044 A.D.
3. United States: 1887
4. Russia: 1892
5. Germany: 1906
6. Japan: 1926
7. Indonesia: 1939
8. Brazil: 1954
9. Bangladesh: 1968
10. Pakistan: 1972
11. Nigeria: 1973
12. Mexico: 1975
13. Vietnam: 1985
14. Philippines: 1989
15. Egypt: 1992
16. Iran: 1995
17. Thailand: 1996
18. Ethiopia: 1997
19. Turkey: 1997
20. France: 2002
21. United Kingdom: 2005
22. DR Congo: 2008
23. Italy: 2013
24. Tanzania: 2021
25. South Africa: 2022
26. Kenya: 2026 (est.)
27. Uganda: 2028 (est.)
28. Sudan: 2034 (est.)
29. Myanmar: 2035 (est.)
30. Iraq: 2038 (est.)
31. Angola: 2041 (est.)
32. Afghanistan: 2044 (est.)
33. Niger: 2044 (est.)
34. Mozambique: 2046 (est.)
35. Algeria: 2049 (est.)
36. Madagascar: 2052 (est.)
37. Ivory Coast: 2060 (est.)
38. Cameroon: 2061 (est.)
39. Ghana: 2062 (est.)
40. Mali: 2069 (est.)
41. Burkina Faso: 2069 (est.)
42. Zambia: 2075 (est.)
43. Somalia: 2080 (est.)
44. Malawi: 2085 (est.)
45. Senegal: 2094 (est.)
46. Chad: 2096 (est.)
47. Morocco: 2100 (est.)

== 70 million milestone ==
1. India: Unknown, most likely 127 B.C.
2. China: Unknown, most likely 1060 A.D.
3. United States: 1895
4. Russia: 1909
5. Japan: 1936
6. Germany: 1938
7. Indonesia: 1951
8. Brazil: 1959
9. Bangladesh: 1975
10. Pakistan: 1977
11. Nigeria: 1979
12. Mexico: 1981
13. Vietnam: 1992
14. Philippines: 1996
15. Egypt: 2001
16. Ethiopia: 2002
17. Iran: 2005
18. Turkey: 2008
19. DR Congo: 2013
20. Thailand: 2022
21. Tanzania: 2024 (est.)
22. United Kingdom: 2029 (est.)
23. Uganda: 2033 (est.)
24. Kenya: 2034 (est.)
25. South Africa: 2038 (est.)
26. Sudan: 2042 (est.)
27. Iraq: 2045 (est.)
28. Angola: 2047 (est.)
29. Niger: 2049 (est.)
30. Mozambique: 2054 (est.)
31. Afghanistan: 2059 (est.)
32. Madagascar: 2062 (est.)
33. Ivory Coast: 2070 (est.)
34. Cameroon: 2073 (est.)
35. Ghana: 2079 (est.)
36. Burkina Faso: 2081 (est.)
37. Mali: 2082 (est.)
38. Zambia: 2086 (est.)
39. Algeria: 2088 (est.)
40. Somalia: 2093 (est.)

== 80 million milestone ==
1. India: Unknown, most likely 134 A.D.
2. China: Unknown, most likely 1079 A.D.
3. United States: 1902
4. Russia: 1923
5. Japan: 1948
6. Indonesia: 1957
7. Brazil: 1964
8. Bangladesh: 1980
9. Pakistan: 1981
10. Nigeria: 1984
11. Mexico: 1987
12. Germany: 1992
13. Vietnam: 2000
14. Philippines: 2002
15. Ethiopia: 2007
16. Egypt: 2008
17. Iran: 2016
18. Turkey: 2017
19. DR Congo: 2017
20. Tanzania: 2029 (est.)
21. Uganda: 2038 (est.)
22. Kenya: 2041 (est.)
23. Sudan: 2050 (est.)
24. Iraq: 2052 (est.)
25. Angola: 2052 (est.)
26. Niger: 2054 (est.)
27. Mozambique: 2062 (est.)
28. Madagascar: 2071 (est.)
29. Ivory Coast: 2080 (est.)
30. South Africa: 2081 (est.)
31. Cameroon: 2085 (est.)
32. Burkina Faso: 2095 (est.)
33. Zambia: 2099 (est.)
34. Mali: 2100 (est.)

== 90 million milestone ==
1. India: Unknown, most likely 398 A.D.
2. China: Unknown, most likely 1099 A.D.
3. United States: 1908
4. Russia: 1936
5. Japan: 1956
6. Indonesia: 1961
7. Brazil: 1968
8. Bangladesh: 1984
9. Pakistan: 1985
10. Nigeria: 1988
11. Mexico: 1993
12. Philippines: 2008
13. Ethiopia: 2012
14. Vietnam: 2012
15. Egypt: 2014
16. DR Congo: 2021
17. Turkey: 2026 (est.)
18. Iran: 2027 (est.)
19. Tanzania: 2033 (est.)
20. Uganda: 2043 (est.)
21. Kenya: 2049 (est.)
22. Angola: 2057 (est.)
23. Sudan: 2057 (est.)
24. Iraq: 2057 (est.)
25. Niger: 2058 (est.)
26. Mozambique: 2069 (est.)
27. Madagascar: 2082 (est.)
28. Ivory Coast: 2092 (est.)
29. Cameroon: 2100 (est.)

== 100 million milestone ==
1. India: Unknown, most likely 664 A.D.
2. China: Unknown, most likely 1175 A.D.
3. United States: 1914
4. Russia: 1948
5. Indonesia: 1965
6. Japan: 1967
7. Brazil: 1972
8. Pakistan: 1988
9. Bangladesh: 1988
10. Nigeria: 1992
11. Mexico: 1999
12. Philippines: 2014
13. Ethiopia: 2016
14. Egypt: 2019
15. DR Congo: 2021
16. Vietnam: 2023
17. Tanzania: 2038 (est.);
18. Iran: 2041 (est.)
19. Sudan: 2061 (est.)
20. Uganda: 2062 (est.)
21. Angola: 2066 (est.)
22. Afghanistan: 2067 (est.)
23. Kenya: 2075 (est.)
24. Yemen: 2080 (est.)
25. Mozambique: 2091 (est.)
26. Ivory Coast: 2095 (est.)
27. Iraq: 2097 (est.)

== 110 million milestone ==
1. India: Unknown, most likely 936 A.D.
2. China: Unknown, most likely 1714
3. United States: 1921
4. Russia: 1955
5. Indonesia: 1969
6. Japan: 1974
7. Brazil: 1976
8. Pakistan: 1991
9. Bangladesh: 1992
10. Nigeria: 1996
11. Mexico: 2007
12. Ethiopia: 2020
13. Philippines: 2021
14. Egypt: 2025
15. DR Congo: 2027 (est.)
16. Vietnam: 2038 (est.)
17. Tanzania: 2041 (est.)
18. Uganda: 2052 (est.)
19. Kenya: 2061 (est.)
20. Angola: 2066 (est.)
21. Niger: 2067 (est.)
22. Iraq: 2069 (est.)
23. Sudan: 2072 (est.)
24. Mozambique: 2086 (est.)

== 120 million milestone ==
1. India: Unknown, most likely 993 A.D.
2. China: Unknown, most likely 1720
3. United States: 1926
4. Russia: 1961
5. Indonesia: 1972
6. Brazil: 1980
7. Japan: 1984
8. Pakistan: 1995
9. Bangladesh: 1996
10. Nigeria: 2000
11. Mexico: 2012
12. Ethiopia: 2021
13. Philippines: 2027 (est.)
14. DR Congo: 2030 (est.)
15. Egypt: 2031 (est.)
16. Tanzania: 2044 (est.)
17. Uganda: 2057 (est.)
18. Kenya: 2070 (est.)
19. Angola: 2071 (est.)
20. Niger: 2071 (est.)
21. Iraq: 2075 (est.)
22. Sudan: 2080 (est.)
23. Mozambique: 2096 (est.)

== 130 million milestone ==
1. India: Unknown, most likely 1480
2. China: Unknown, most likely 1731
3. United States: 1938
4. Russia: 1971
5. Indonesia: 1976
6. Brazil: 1985
7. Pakistan: 1999
8. Bangladesh: 2001
9. Nigeria: 2004
10. Mexico: 2021
11. Ethiopia: 2027 (est.)
12. DR Congo: 2033 (est.)
13. Philippines: 2034 (est.)
14. Egypt: 2037 (est.)
15. Tanzania: 2048 (est.)
16. Uganda: 2061 (est.)
17. Niger: 2076 (est.)
18. Angola: 2078 (est.)
19. Kenya: 2080 (est.)
20. Iraq: 2082 (est.)
21. Sudan: 2091 (est.)

== 140 million milestone ==
1. India: Unknown, most likely 1610
2. China: Unknown, most likely 1738
3. United States: 1943
4. Indonesia: 1979
5. Russia: 1983
6. Brazil: 1987
7. Pakistan: 2001
8. Bangladesh: 2004
9. Nigeria: 2006
10. Mexico: 2025 (est.)
11. Ethiopia: 2031 (est.)
12. DR Congo: 2036 (est.)
13. Philippines: 2041 (est.)
14. Egypt: 2042 (est.)
15. Tanzania: 2051 (est.)
16. Uganda: 2065 (est.)
17. Niger: 2080 (est.)
18. Angola: 2083 (est.)
19. Iraq: 2089 (est.)
20. Kenya: 2096 (est.)

== 150 million milestone ==
1. India: Unknown, most likely 1647
2. China: Unknown, most likely 1742
3. United States: 1948
4. Indonesia: 1981
5. Brazil: 1991
6. Russia: 1992
7. Pakistan: 2004
8. Nigeria: 2008
9. Bangladesh: 2009
10. Ethiopia: 2032 (est.)
11. Mexico: 2033 (est.)
12. DR Congo: 2039 (est.)
13. Egypt: 2048 (est.)
14. Philippines: 2049 (est.)
15. Tanzania: 2054 (est.)
16. Uganda: 2069 (est.)
17. Niger: 2081 (est.)
18. Angola: 2084 (est.)
19. Iraq: 2096 (est.)

== 200 million milestone ==
1. China: Unknown, most likely 1761
2. India: 1855
3. United States: 1967
4. Indonesia: 1997
5. Brazil: 2012
6. Pakistan: 2018
7. Nigeria: 2019
8. Bangladesh: 2038 (est.)
9. Ethiopia: 2043 (est.)
10. DR Congo: 2046 (est.)
11. Tanzania: 2069 (est.)
12. Egypt: 2091 (est.)

== 250 million milestone ==
1. China: 1775
2. India: 1907
3. United States: 1989
4. Indonesia: 2013
5. Pakistan: 2025
6. Nigeria: 2028 (est.)
7. DR Congo: 2063 (est.)
8. Ethiopia: 2068 (est.)
9. Tanzania: 2084 (est.)

== 300 million milestone ==
1. China: 1795
2. India: 1934
3. United States: 2006
4. Indonesia: 2032 (est.)
5. Pakistan: 2035 (est.)
6. Nigeria: 2036 (est.)
7. DR Congo: 2067 (est.)
8. Ethiopia: 2072 (est.)
9. Tanzania: 2099 (est.)

== 350 million milestone ==
1. China: 1810
2. India: 1947
3. United States: 2028 (est.)
4. Nigeria: 2043 (est.)
5. Pakistan: 2054 (est.)
6. DR Congo: 2090 (est.)

== 400 million milestone ==
1. China: 1900
2. India: 1954
3. Nigeria: 2049 (est.)
4. United States: 2058 (est.)
5. DR Congo: 2091 (est.)

== 450 million milestone ==
1. China: 1916
2. India: 1961
3. Nigeria: 2055 (est.)
4. United States: 2105 (est.)

== 500 million milestone ==
1. China: 1933
2. India: 1966
3. Nigeria: 2065 (est.)

== 600 million milestone ==
1. China: 1954
2. India: 1974
3. Nigeria: 2074 (est.)

== 700 million milestone ==
1. China: 1964
2. India: 1981
3. Nigeria: 2086 (est.)

== 800 million milestone ==
1. China: 1969
2. India: 1987

== 900 million milestone ==
1. China: 1974
2. India: 1992

== 1 billion milestone ==
1. China: 1981
2. India: 1997

== 1.1 billion milestone ==
1. China: 1988
2. India: 2002

== 1.2 billion milestone ==
1. China: 1995
2. India: 2008

== 1.3 billion milestone ==
1. China: 2003
2. India: 2014

== 1.4 billion milestone ==
1. China: 2017
2. India: 2022

== 1.5 billion milestone ==
1. India: 2030 (est.)

== 1.6 billion milestone ==
1. India: 2040 (est.)

== 1.7 billion milestone ==
1. India: 2060 (est.)

== Population cap ==
1. India: 2062 (est.) at 1.678 billion, the maximum population of any nation in human history
