= List of countries by meat production =

Global meat production by region

Meat supply per person

The following article lists the world's largest producers of meat. Global meat production has increased rapidly over the past 50 years. According to Our World in Data, meat production has more than quintupled since 1961, reaching around 361 million tonnes in 2022. The most popular meat globally is poultry, followed by pork, beef and mutton. Over 90 billion animals are slaughtered each year for meat.

== List ==
Countries and some territories by meat production.

Country	Meat production (in tonnes)	Year
China	92,948,520	2022
United States	47,530,724	2022
Brazil	30,397,944	2022
Russia	12,244,950	2022
India	10,644,195	2022
Mexico	7,891,058	2022
Spain	7,562,136	2022
Germany	7,026,648	2022
Argentina	6,339,574	2022
Pakistan	5,248,574	2022
Canada	5,213,636	2022
France	5,106,484	2022
Poland	5,091,000	2022
Indonesia	4,985,907	2022
Vietnam	4,730,438	2022
Turkey	4,669,652	2022
Australia	4,471,332	2022
United Kingdom	4,220,672	2022
Japan	4,163,305	2022
South Africa	3,534,461	2022
Egypt	3,406,693	2022
Colombia	3,064,670	2022
Netherlands	2,999,508	2022
Thailand	2,961,210	2022
Philippines	2,907,638	2022
South Korea	2,727,070	2022
Iran	2,702,516	2022
Peru	2,256,424	2022
Ukraine	2,205,514	2022
Malaysia	1,912,610	2022
Denmark	1,882,619	2022
Belgium	1,724,323	2022
Nigeria	1,651,712	2022
Taiwan	1,585,565	2022
Chile	1,559,920	2022
New Zealand	1,456,140	2022
Saudi Arabia	1,388,790	2022
Uzbekistan	1,348,460	2022
Kazakhstan	1,240,976	2022
Belarus	1,220,493	2022
Ireland	1,184,998	2022
Morocco	1,173,980	2022
Myanmar	1,116,716	2022
Sudan	1,017,911	2022
Bolivia	998,284	2022
Venezuela	968,196	2022
Romania	965,262	2022
Hungary	960,509	2022
Ecuador	954,060	2022
Chad	922,437	2022
Zimbabwe	918,058	2022
Austria	874,227	2021
Israel	862,670	2022
Portugal	859,039	2022
Ethiopia	844,000	2022
Algeria	803,545	2022
Tanzania	798,138	2022
Uruguay	739,750	2022
Bangladesh	735,879	2022
Paraguay	666,553	2022
Guatemala	663,713	2022
Malawi	630,759	2022
Kenya	609,255	2022
Sweden	569,568	2022
Burkina Faso	564,302	2022
Mongolia	554,546	2022
Papua New Guinea	528,814	2022
Serbia	526,380	2022
Nepal	512,789	2022
Dominican Republic	501,743	2022
Switzerland	495,054	2022
Czech Republic	467,546	2019
Greece	459,087	2022
Uganda	454,417	2022
Yemen	436,244	2022
Cameroon	415,030	2022
Finland	403,712	2022
Tajikistan	377,983	2022
Tunisia	373,125	2022
Norway	372,784	2022
Angola	369,918	2022
Azerbaijan	368,323	2022
Turkmenistan	359,569	2022
Syria	342,504	2022
Senegal	338,927	2022
Honduras	333,851	2022
Panama	332,068	2022
North Korea	324,407	2022
Nicaragua	322,374	2022
Jordan	320,606	2022
Zambia	314,965	2022
Mozambique	311,080	2022
Costa Rica	310,487	2022
Ivory Coast	309,188	2022
Ghana	308,458	2022
Cuba	291,392	2022
Afghanistan	271,641	2022
Sri Lanka	260,288	2022
Kyrgyzstan	256,840	2022
Iraq	254,365	2022
Democratic Republic of the Congo	251,417	2022
South Sudan	246,185	2022
Croatia	231,050	2022
Bulgaria	221,739	2019
Lithuania	213,371	2021
Laos	211,602	2022
Niger	196,479	2022
Central African Republic	191,389	2022
Cambodia	189,963	2022
El Salvador	185,709	2022
Somalia	185,700	2022
Libya	183,581	2022
Lebanon	175,472	2022
Mali	174,869	2022
United Arab Emirates	174,344	2022
Madagascar	162,164	2022
Jamaica	154,067	2022
Slovenia	137,900	2022
Hong Kong	133,441	2022
Guinea	126,802	2022
Mauritania	126,701	2022
Kuwait	125,523	2022
Moldova	115,782	2022
Haiti	108,362	2022
Armenia	103,428	2022
Benin	102,526	2022
Latvia	92,230	2022
Oman	89,985	2022
Bosnia and Herzegovina	88,705	2022
Rwanda	84,521	2022
Albania	80,836	2022
Cyprus	79,222	2022
Estonia	75,380	2022
Singapore	74,759	2022
Georgia	74,539	2022
Togo	70,986	2022
Botswana	69,926	2022
Namibia	68,713	2022
Republic of the Congo	63,271	2022
Palestine	61,229	2022
Guyana	60,821	2022
Mauritius	59,176	2022
Trinidad and Tobago	54,410	2022
Fiji	53,917	2022
Sierra Leone	50,821	2022
Burundi	45,581	2022
Eritrea	42,664	2022
Puerto Rico	41,876	2022
Gabon	41,086	2022
Bahrain	36,639	2022
Liberia	36,146	2022
Brunei	34,219	2022
Iceland	33,700	2022
Qatar	33,364	2022
Timor-Leste	29,031	2022
Eswatini	26,065	2022
Guinea-Bissau	25,603	2022
Belize	24,940	2022
North Macedonia	23,842	2022
Luxembourg	22,740	2022
Barbados	18,620	2022
Suriname	17,224	2022
Djibouti	11,445	2022
Malta	9,948	2022
Montenegro	9,703	2022
Lesotho	9,155	2022
Macau	9,035	2022
Gambia	7,448	2022
New Caledonia	6,903	2022
Bahamas	6,526	2022
Vanuatu	5,356	2022
Lesotho	9,221	2021
Cape Verde	4,442	2022
Bhutan	4,240	2022
Solomon Islands	3,634	2022
Samoa	3,283	2022
Saint Lucia	3,114	2022
Tonga	2,440	2022
Seychelles	2,359	2022
Comoros	2,296	2022
Kiribati	2,073	2022
French Polynesia	1,656	2022
São Tomé and Príncipe	1,497	2022
Federated States of Micronesia	1,479	2022
Dominica	1,414	2022
Saint Vincent and the Grenadines	1,063	2022
Grenada	1,018	2022
Maldives	855	2022
Faroe Islands	705	2022
Equatorial Guinea	649	2022
Cook Islands	424	2022
Saint Kitts and Nevis	234	2022
Antigua and Barbuda	212	2022
Tuvalu	190	2022
Niue	95	2022
Nauru	78	2022
Tokelau	51	2022
Antigua and Barbuda	148	2021
Saint Kitts and Nevis	146	2021
Niue	94	2021
Nauru	80	2021
Tokelau	63	2021
Vatican City	0	2021

== World production ==
World production in tonnes.

Year	Production
1961	71,355,140
1962	74,647,840
1963	78,823,750
1964	80,407,490
1965	84,458,136
1966	88,121,970
1967	92,260,990
1968	95,201,270
1969	96,971,760
1970	100,659,640

Year	Production
1971	104,822,860
1972	107,769,760
1973	108,533,140
1974	114,030,510
1975	115,811,310
1976	118,719,950
1977	122,631,550
1978	127,517,624
1979	132,754,020
1980	136,760,480

Year	Production
1981	139,386,030
1982	140,687,800
1983	145,349,580
1984	149,489,250
1985	154,547,980
1986	159,185,870
1987	164,926,050
1988	171,125,150
1989	173,711,410
1990	179,524,260

Year	Production
1991	183,025,100
1992	186,893,460
1993	191,271,680
1994	197,929,380
1995	207,511,600
1996	205,325,090
1997	214,549,010
1998	223,077,060
1999	229,570,600
2000	231,911,820

Year	Production
2001	235,966,460
2002	242,955,220
2003	248,348,180
2004	254,070,850
2005	260,125,040
2006	266,088,860
2007	272,305,400
2008	281,270,850
2009	286,807,300
2010	294,415,650

Year	Production
2011	299,366,560
2012	307,532,300
2013	314,169,950
2014	320,344,860
2015	327,079,650
2016	329,870,370
2017	335,797,920
2018	341,013,630
2019	338,109,200
2020	338,912,200

Year	Production
2021	354,536,580
2022	360,617,700
2023	
2024	
2025	
2026	
2027	
2028	
2029	
2030	
