= List of countries by textile exports =

The following is a list of countries by textile exports. Data is for 2023, in thousands of United States dollars, as reported by The Observatory of Economic Complexity.

Country	Trade value	Share (%)
China	267,717,841	32.486
Bangladesh	45,964,126	5.577
Vietnam	41,355,461	5.018
Germany	39,440,350	4.786
Italy	38,328,783	4.651
India	36,216,984	4.395
Turkey	33,551,489	4.071
United States	25,171,304	3.054
Pakistan	17,921,593	2.175
Spain	17,791,873	2.159
France	17,599,574	2.136
Netherlands	14,892,235	1.807
Indonesia	12,884,585	1.563
Cambodia	11,748,858	1.426
Belgium	10,116,113	1.228
Japan	7,940,196	0.963
United Kingdom	7,514,836	0.912
Poland	7,462,718	0.906
Mexico	7,352,356	0.892
Taiwan	7,263,568	0.881
South Korea	7,078,866	0.859
Thailand	6,864,877	0.833
Portugal	6,631,311	0.805
Myanmar	6,033,967	0.732
Morocco	5,915,414	0.718
Sri Lanka	5,639,688	0.684
Australia	5,380,166	0.653
Egypt	5,218,423	0.633
Czech Republic	5,107,068	0.620
Austria	4,995,604	0.606
Romania	4,819,320	0.585
Denmark	4,761,832	0.578
Tunisia	4,119,289	0.500
Brazil	4,096,508	0.497
Switzerland	4,038,662	0.490
Hong Kong	3,854,207	0.468
Uzbekistan	3,822,608	0.464
United Arab Emirates	3,670,480	0.445
Honduras	3,135,540	0.380
Canada	3,089,459	0.375
Malaysia	2,800,140	0.340
Sweden	2,770,414	0.336
Bulgaria	2,671,922	0.324
Jordan	2,515,846	0.305
El Salvador	2,361,899	0.287
Guatemala	2,040,315	0.248
Hungary	2,025,242	0.246
Nicaragua	1,957,928	0.238
Slovakia	1,913,140	0.232
Greece	1,771,637	0.215
Lithuania	1,676,424	0.203
Peru	1,654,649	0.201
Singapore	1,431,395	0.174
Philippines	1,314,755	0.160
South Africa	1,297,317	0.157
Dominican Republic	1,267,096	0.154
Serbia	1,230,872	0.149
Croatia	1,207,331	0.147
Slovenia	1,053,577	0.128
Israel	982,740	0.119
Luxembourg	935,073	0.113
Madagascar	907,071	0.110
Haiti	868,668	0.105
Colombia	808,339	0.098
Albania	780,111	0.095
Saudi Arabia	694,646	0.084
Finland	676,940	0.082
Ireland	666,554	0.081
Russia	630,583	0.077
North Macedonia	597,361	0.072
Latvia	592,247	0.072
Moldova	575,529	0.070
Bosnia and Herzegovina	541,816	0.066
New Zealand	535,121	0.065
Benin	525,737	0.064
Mauritius	491,213	0.060
Estonia	480,925	0.058
Ukraine	468,282	0.057
Kenya	466,307	0.057
Laos	458,737	0.056
Lesotho	455,365	0.055
Chile	432,544	0.052
Armenia	426,406	0.052
Ethiopia	418,834	0.051
Nepal	391,238	0.047
Norway	379,716	0.046
Tanzania	358,768	0.044
Mongolia	339,356	0.041
Georgia	331,255	0.040
Paraguay	320,763	0.039
Kazakhstan	316,626	0.038
Argentina	301,280	0.037
Cote d'Ivoire	284,051	0.034
Burkina Faso	267,821	0.032
Macau	250,688	0.030
Sudan	247,332	0.030
Eswatini	234,607	0.028
Azerbaijan	199,724	0.024
Kyrgyzstan	191,949	0.023
Costa Rica	190,527	0.023
Belarus	185,198	0.022
Turkmenistan	166,443	0.020
Uruguay	165,302	0.020
Afghanistan	161,261	0.020
Iran	158,018	0.019
Tajikistan	142,042	0.017
Bahrain	124,909	0.015
Ecuador	96,825	0.012
Syria	87,979	0.011
Lebanon	81,816	0.010
Malta	80,316	0.010
Panama	77,297	0.009
Mozambique	71,378	0.009
Fiji	70,630	0.009
Oman	70,394	0.009
Nigeria	69,330	0.008
Senegal	68,696	0.008
Kuwait	64,763	0.008
Uganda	63,540	0.008
Mali	55,219	0.007
Zimbabwe	47,161	0.006
Zambia	46,018	0.006
Ghana	45,558	0.006
Cameroon	40,121	0.005
Cyprus	38,859	0.005
Qatar	30,140	0.004
Botswana	25,734	0.003
Iceland	23,289	0.003
Rwanda	19,220	0.002
Algeria	17,659	0.002
Togo	17,049	0.002
Bolivia	15,067	0.002
Chad	12,095	0.001
San Marino	11,945	0.001
Namibia	11,622	0.001
Malawi	11,114	0.001
Brunei	11,008	0.001
Andorra	9,128	0.001
Eritrea	8,748	0.001
Venezuela	8,647	0.001
North Korea	8,237	0.001
Djibouti	7,698	0.001
Montenegro	7,507	0.001
Falkland Islands	6,574	0.001
Cape Verde	5,717	0.001
Curacao	5,163	0.001
Sierra Leone	4,199	0.001
Anguilla	3,984	0.000
Jamaica	3,898	0.000
Iraq	3,527	0.000
Niger	2,977	0.000
Tokelau	2,791	0.000
Bahamas	2,631	0.000
DR Congo	2,465	0.000
Trinidad and Tobago	2,181	0.000
Mauritania	2,090	0.000
Greenland	1,895	0.000
Libya	1,892	0.000
Barbados	1,691	0.000
Central African Republic	1,571	0.000
Seychelles	1,532	0.000
Belize	1,495	0.000
Saint Kitts and Nevis	1,338	0.000
Gibraltar	1,257	0.000
Suriname	1,256	0.000
Liberia	1,225	0.000
Gabon	1,073	0.000
Marshall Islands	1,010	0.000
Turks and Caicos Islands	948	0.000
Nauru	889	0.000
Aruba	866	0.000
British Virgin Islands	813	0.000
Cook Islands	753	0.000
Gambia	717	0.000
Antigua and Barbuda	657	0.000
Micronesia	641	0.000
Yemen	626	0.000
Cayman Islands	571	0.000
Angola	472	0.000
Saint Barthelemy	458	0.000
Guam	441	0.000
Burundi	412	0.000
French Polynesia	384	0.000
Guinea	383	0.000
Kiribati	381	0.000
Dominica	356	0.000
Cocos (Keeling) Islands	306	0.000
Niue	284	0.000
Samoa	282	0.000
Maldives	267	0.000
New Caledonia	265	0.000
Guyana	261	0.000
Cuba	256	0.000
Saint Vincent and the Grenadines	232	0.000
Grenada	229	0.000
Bermuda	223	0.000
Palestine	210	0.000
Saint Martin	206	0.000
Republic of the Congo	191	0.000
American Samoa	174	0.000
Timor-Leste	167	0.000
Comoros	163	0.000
Christmas Island	159	0.000
Papua New Guinea	139	0.000
Saint Lucia	104	0.000
Somalia	98	0.000
British Indian Ocean Territory	92	0.000
Bonaire	80	0.000
South Sudan	77	0.000
Montserrat	76	0.000
Tuvalu	74	0.000
Palau	73	0.000
Bhutan	72	0.000
Tonga	68	0.000
Sao Tome and Principe	60	0.000
Saint Helena	53	0.000
Vanuatu	38	0.000
Wallis and Futuna	34	0.000
Solomon Islands	34	0.000
French South Antarctic Territory	33	0.000
Northern Mariana Islands	27	0.000
Norfolk Island	15	0.000
Guinea-Bissau	15	0.000
Equatorial Guinea	13	0.000
Pitcairn Islands	10	0.000
Saint Pierre and Miquelon	7	0.000
