= List of countries by median years of schooling =

Mean years of schooling long run

This is a list of 189 countries ordered by the median number of years that the people in them go to school. The source data comes from the Human Development Index from the United Nations Development Programme's Human Development Report. The latest report was released on 14 September 2018 and is based on data collected in 2017.
