= List of countries by mean age at childbearing =

The following list sorts countries and dependent territories by mean age at childbearing. The mean age at childbearing indicates the age of a woman at their childbearing events, if women were subject throughout their lives to the age-specific fertility rates observed in that given year.

Note that the "mean" used is specifically the "median age".

== List ==
Countries and dependent territories by the mean age at childbearing in 2026 according to the World Population Prospects 2024 of the United Nations Department of Economic and Social Affairs.

Country or territory	Age (2026)
South Korea	33.4
Hong Kong	32.9
San Marino	32.8
Ireland	32.7
Andorra	32.5
Spain	32.5
Taiwan	32.3
Greece	32.3
Italy	32.3
Luxembourg	32.3
Singapore	32.3
Switzerland	32.3
Japan	32.2
Liechtenstein	32.2
United Arab Emirates	32.2
Bermuda	32.1
Macau	32.1
Portugal	32.1
Cyprus	32.0
Guadeloupe	32.0
France	31.9
Libya	31.9
Netherlands	31.9
Denmark	31.8
Martinique	31.8
Oman	31.8
Norway	31.8
Canada	31.7
Chile	31.7
Finland	31.7
Germany	31.7
Sweden	31.7
Australia	31.6
Djibouti	31.5
Algeria	31.4
Austria	31.4
Tunisia	31.4
Belgium	31.3
Estonia	31.3
Malta	31.3
United Kingdom	31.2
Saint Martin	31.1
Cayman Islands	31.0
Croatia	31.0
Iceland	31.0
Israel	31.0
Malaysia	31.0
Jersey	31.0
Monaco	30.9
Saint Barthélemy	30.9
Guernsey	30.9
Brunei	30.8
New Zealand	30.8
Saint Helena	30.8
Lithuania	30.7
New Caledonia	30.7
Réunion	30.7
Turks and Caicos Islands	30.7
Afghanistan	30.6
Czech Republic	30.6
Falkland Islands	30.6
Latvia	30.6
Rwanda	30.6
Slovenia	30.6
Gibraltar	30.5
Montenegro	30.5
Faroe Islands	30.4
Kuwait	30.4
Maldives	30.4
Qatar	30.4
Wallis and Futuna	30.4
Curaçao	30.3
Saudi Arabia	30.3
Comoros	30.2
Hungary	30.2
Mauritania	30.2
Montserrat	30.2
United States	30.2
Bhutan	30.1
Burundi	30.1
Democratic Republic of the Congo	30.1
Poland	30.1
Bahrain	30.0
Western Sahara	30.0
Mayotte	29.9
Jordan	29.9
Morocco	29.9
Senegal	29.9
Tonga	29.9
Gambia	29.8
Serbia	29.8
Sudan	29.8
Isle of Man	29.8
Sri Lanka	29.7
Kosovo	29.7
Yemen	29.7
Albania	29.5
American Samoa	29.5
French Guiana	29.5
Haiti	29.5
Mauritius	29.5
Turkey	29.5
Uruguay	29.5
China	29.4
French Polynesia	29.4
Ghana	29.4
Bonaire	29.4
Guinea-Bissau	29.4
Saint Pierre and Miquelon	29.4
Tokelau	29.4
Argentina	29.3
Bosnia and Herzegovina	29.3
Chad	29.3
Cook Islands	29.3
Guam	29.3
Mongolia	29.3
Niue	29.3
Russia	29.3
Somalia	29.3
North Macedonia	29.3
Lebanon	29.2
Northern Mariana Islands	29.2
Papua New Guinea	29.2
East Timor	29.2
Tuvalu	29.2
Solomon Islands	29.1
Eritrea	29.1
Indonesia	29.1
Kazakhstan	29.1
Aruba	29.1
Sint Maarten	29.1
Niger	29.1
Nigeria	29.1
Philippines	29.1
Slovakia	29.1
Burkina Faso	29.1
Samoa	29.1
Belarus	29.0
Benin	29.0
Ethiopia	29.0
Georgia	29.0
Kiribati	29.0
Ivory Coast	29.0
Bahamas	28.9
Cape Verde	28.9
Central African Republic	28.9
Fiji	28.9
Iran	28.9
Namibia	28.9
Micronesia	28.9
Pakistan	28.9
Peru	28.9
Saint Lucia	28.9
Togo	28.9
Tanzania	28.9
North Korea	28.8
Mali	28.8
Syria	28.8
British Virgin Islands	28.7
Myanmar	28.7
Grenada	28.7
Botswana	28.6
Republic of the Congo	28.6
Costa Rica	28.6
Iraq	28.6
Suriname	28.6
Thailand	28.6
Angola	28.5
Gabon	28.5
Palestine	28.5
Kyrgyzstan	28.5
Palau	28.5
Romania	28.5
Sierra Leone	28.5
Ukraine	28.5
Antigua and Barbuda	28.4
Cameroon	28.4
Anguilla	28.4
Saint Vincent and the Grenadines	28.4
São Tomé and Príncipe	28.4
South Sudan	28.4
Bulgaria	28.3
Moldova	28.3
Mozambique	28.3
South Africa	28.3
Zambia	28.3
Armenia	28.2
Dominica	28.2
Kenya	28.2
Liberia	28.2
Uganda	28.2
Bolivia	28.1
Brazil	28.1
Greenland	28.1
Guinea	28.1
Puerto Rico	28.1
Zimbabwe	28.1
Egypt	28.1
Jamaica	28.0
Vanuatu	28.0
Cambodia	27.8
India	27.8
Lesotho	27.8
Madagascar	27.8
Eswatini	27.8
Trinidad and Tobago	27.8
Turkmenistan	27.8
United States Virgin Islands	27.8
Barbados	27.7
Dominican Republic	27.7
Seychelles	27.7
Paraguay	27.6
Saint Kitts and Nevis	27.6
Ecuador	27.5
Malawi	27.5
Panama	27.5
Belize	27.2
El Salvador	27.2
Guatemala	27.2
Honduras	27.2
Vietnam	27.2
Guyana	27.1
Nauru	27.1
Marshall Islands	27.1
Uzbekistan	27.1
Equatorial Guinea	26.9
Mexico	26.8
Colombia	26.7
Tajikistan	26.4
Cuba	26.3
Venezuela	26.3
Bangladesh	26.2
Laos	26.1
Azerbaijan	26.0
Nicaragua	26.0
Nepal	25.2
