= List of countries by child labour rate =

The List of countries by child labour rate provides rankings of countries based on their rates of child labour. Child labour is defined by the International Labour Organisation (ILO) as participation in economic activity by underage persons aged 5 to 17. Child work harms children, interferes with their education, and prevents their development. The prevalence of child labour is notable in regions such as Sub-Saharan Africa, South Asia, Southeast Asia, Latin America and the Caribbean, and the Middle East and North Africa. In 2025, nearly 138 million children worldwide were working, comList

The list of child labour rates according to ILO estimates.

Country	Child labour rate in %			Year
Country	Total	Male	Female	Year
Burundi	53.5	52.2	54.9	2020
Niger	42.4	45.2	39.4	2022
Uganda	40.1	40.6	39.5	2021
Cameroon	33.4	38.5	32.8	2014
Chad	30.9	33.8	27.8	2024
Guinea-Bissau	30.4	30.0	30.7	2022
Nigeria	28.1	28.7	27.6	2022
Vanuatu	26.7	26.0	27.4	2023
Nicaragua	25.9	33.3	17.9	2012
Tonga	25.9	32.9	18.5	2019
Togo	25.7	23.7	27.8	2022
Zimbabwe	25.6	31.8	19.0	2021
Madagascar	24.7	24.3	25.1	2022
Malawi	24.1	20.1	28.1	2020
Laos	21.9	22.2	21.4	2023
Haiti	21.6	22.4	20.2	2012
Liberia	21.1	20.8	21.5	2019–20
Mali	21.0	22.1	19.8	2020
Sierra Leone	21.0	22.5	19.6	2017
Guinea	19.5	21.1	17.8	2016
Nepal	19.2	19.0	19.3	2014
Ethiopia	18.7	21.4	15.9	2021
Burkina Faso	18.4	16.7	20.2	2022
Central African Republic	18.4	17.3	19.5	2018–19
Kyrgyzstan	18.0	21.6	14.3	2023
Uzbekistan	17.8	21.1	14.5	2021–22
Peru	16.2	16.7	15.7	2021
Benin	16.0	17.8	14.2	2021–22
Fiji	15.6	18.8	12.3	2021
Gambia	15.1	16.0	14.1	2022–23
Sudan	15.0	15.0	15.0	2022
Tanzania	15.0	16.9	13.0	2020–21
DR Congo	14.7	14.2	15.3	2020
Solomon Islands	13.8	13.8	13.8	2015
Afghanistan	13.3	15.6	10.9	2022–23
Honduras	12.9	17.5	8.2	2023
Côte d'Ivoire	12.8	12.4	13.3	2022
Bolivia	12.6	13.1	12.0	2023
Guatemala	12.2	15.5	8.9	2022
Eswatini	11.3	11.0	11.7	2021–22
Mozambique	10.9	11.6	10.3	2022
Congo	10.8	9.9	11.7	2014–15
Cambodia	10.4	11.1	9.6	2021
Angola	9.7	8.9	10.4	2015–16
Serbia	9.1	11.1	6.8	2019
Senegal	8.6	12.6	4.7	2022
Egypt	8.5	11.1	5.6	2023
Lesotho	8.2	11.1	5.4	2018
Myanmar	8.1	8.7	7.6	2015
Montenegro	7.7	8.4	6.9	2018
Yemen	7.7	10.0	5.3	2022–23
Kiribati	7.1	8.6	5.5	2018–19
Bangladesh	7.0	9.5	4.4	2022
Samoa	6.9	8.7	4.9	2022
Pakistan	6.8	10.1	3.2	2021
Sao Tome and Principe	6.7	6.1	7.4	2019
Palestine	6.3	9.2	3.3	2019–20
Mongolia	6.0	6.8	5.1	2023
Comoros	5.8	6.7	4.9	2022
Vietnam	5.7	5.2	6.2	2020–21
Zambia	5.7	6.2	5.2	2022
Turkey	5.6	6.7	4.5	2022
Ghana	5.5	5.9	5.0	2022
Gabon	5.4	7.0	3.9	2019–21
Guyana	4.9	5.1	4.6	2019–20
Paraguay	4.9	7.2	2.6	2023
Azerbaijan	4.8	6.4	2.9	2023
Kenya	4.3	5.3	3.2	2021
Mexico	4.3	5.9	2.6	2022
Trinidad and Tobago	4.2	5.4	3.0	2022
Chile	4.1	4.6	3.6	2023
Turks and Caicos Islands	4.1	5.7	2.2	2019–20
Belarus	4.0	4.6	3.4	2019
North Korea	4.0	4.3	3.7	2017
Armenia	3.9	4.9	2.7	2015
Kosovo	3.8	5.5	1.9	2019–20
Timor-Leste	3.7	3.8	3.5	2022
Tuvalu	3.7	3.4	4.0	2019–20
Uruguay	3.7	5.1	2.3	2010
Rwanda	3.5	3.9	3.2	2016–17
Costa Rica	3.4	4.0	2.7	2018
Ecuador	3.4	3.8	3.0	2022
Suriname	3.4	4.4	2.4	2018
Dominican Republic	3.1	4.1	2.0	2019
Iraq	3.1	4.3	1.9	2018
Mauritania	3.1	4.3	1.7	2019
El Salvador	2.9	4.1	1.6	2023
Albania	2.8	3.4	2.1	2010
Jamaica	2.6	3.0	2.1	2022
North Macedonia	2.4	3.4	1.6	2018–19
Belize	2.2	3.2	1.2	2013
Ukraine	2.2	2.2	2.1	2012
Algeria	1.9	2.5	1.3	2018–19
Panama	1.9	2.4	1.5	2023
Saint Lucia	1.9	2.4	1.4	2012
South Africa	1.9	2.4	1.3	2015
Argentina	1.8	2.1	1.5	2016–17
Bhutan	1.7	1.6	1.7	2010
Indonesia	1.7	–	–	2021
Tunisia	1.7	2.3	1.2	2023
Brazil	1.5	2.0	1.0	2022
Georgia	1.5	2.1	0.9	2015
Colombia	1.3	1.8	0.8	2022
Barbados	1.2	1.7	0.8	2012
Jordan	1.2	2.2	0.2	2016
Philippines	1.2	1.4	1.0	2022
India	1.0	1.4	0.5	2023
Sri Lanka	0.8	0.9	0.6	2016
Nauru	0.7	1.1	0.4	2023
Turkmenistan	0.3	0.4	0.1	2015–16

== By region ==
Region	Child labour rate in % (Ages 5–17 in 2020)		
Region	Total	Male	Female
Africa	18.0	20.3	15.6
Latin America and the Caribbean	4.3	5.5	3.0
Northern America	0.2	0.3	0.1
Northern Europe	0.2	0.2	0.1
Eastern Europe	4.6	5.2	4.0
Western Europe	0.2	0.2	0.1
Southern Europe	1.3	1.5	1.0
Eastern Asia	2.8	3.9	1.6
South-Eastern Asia	9.2	10.9	7.4
Central Asia	11.9	13.1	10.7
Western Asia	6.3	7.4	5.1
Southern Asia	4.5	5.8	2.9
Pacific Islands	7.7	8.8	6.5
