= List of countries by electrification rate =

World map of the share of the population with access to electricity per country

This list of countries by electrification rate sorts countries by the share of their inhabitants with access to electricity. Access to electricity is considered one of the prerequisites for a modern life. In 2024, 91.9% of the world population had access to electricity. Worldwide, there are major differences between urban and rural regions and the degree of electrification. From the list, 135 countries or territories have a 100% electrification rate.

== By country ==
Location	Share of population with access to electricity			Year
Location	% of total	% of urban	% of rural	Year
Albania	100 %			2023
Algeria	100 %			2023
Andorra	100 %			2023
Antigua and Barbuda	100 %			2023
Argentina	100 %			2023
Armenia	100 %			2023
Aruba	100 %			2023
Australia	100 %			2023
Austria	100 %			2023
Azerbaijan	100 %			2023
Bahamas	100 %			2023
Bahrain	100 %			2023
Barbados	100 %			2023
Belarus	100 %			2023
Belgium	100 %			2023
Bermuda	100 %			2023
Bhutan	100 %			2023
Bosnia and Herzegovina	100 %			2023
Brazil	100 %			2023
Brunei	100 %			2023
Bulgaria	100 %			2023
Canada	100 %			2023
Cayman Islands	100 %			2023
Chile	100 %			2023
China	100 %			2023
Costa Rica	100 %			2023
Croatia	100 %			2023
Cuba	100 %			2023
Curaçao	100 %			2023
Cyprus	100 %			2023
Czech Republic	100 %			2023
Denmark	100 %			2023
Dominica	100 %			2023
Egypt	100 %			2023
Estonia	100 %			2023
Finland	100 %			2023
France	100 %			2023
French Polynesia	100 %			2023
Georgia	100 %			2023
Germany	100 %			2023
Gibraltar	100 %			2023
Greece	100 %			2023
Greenland	100 %			2023
Grenada	100 %			2023
Guam	100 %			2023
Guatemala	100 %			2023
Hong Kong	100 %			2023
Hungary	100 %			2023
Iran	100 %			2023
Iraq	100 %			2023
Iceland	100 %			2023
Ireland	100 %			2023
Israel	100 %			2023
Italy	100 %			2023
Jamaica	100 %			2023
Japan	100 %			2023
Kazakhstan	100 %			2023
Kosovo	100 %			2021
Kuwait	100 %			2023
Kyrgyzstan	100 %			2023
Latvia	100 %			2023
Lebanon	100 %			2023
Liechtenstein	100 %			2023
Lithuania	100 %			2023
Luxembourg	100 %			2023
Macau	100 %			2023
Mauritius	100 %			2023
Malaysia	100 %			2023
Maldives	100 %			2023
Malta	100 %			2023
Marshall Islands	100 %			2023
Mexico	100 %			2023
Moldova	100 %			2023
Monaco	100 %			2023
Mongolia	100 %			2023
Montenegro	100 %			2023
Morocco	100 %			2023
Nauru	100 %			2023
Netherlands	100 %			2023
New Caledonia	100 %			2023
New Zealand	100 %			2023
North Macedonia	100 %			2023
Northern Mariana Islands	100 %			2023
Norway	100 %			2023
Oman	100 %			2023
Palau	100 %			2023
Palestine	100 %			2021
Panama	100 %			2023
Paraguay	100 %			2023
Poland	100 %			2023
Portugal	100 %			2023
Puerto Rico	100 %			2023
Qatar	100 %			2023
Romania	100 %			2023
Russia	100 %			2023
Saint Kitts and Nevis	100 %			2023
Saint Lucia	100 %			2023
Saint Vincent and the Grenadines	100 %			2023
Samoa	100 %			2023
San Marino	100 %			2023
Saudi Arabia	100 %			2023
Serbia	100 %			2023
Seychelles	100 %			2023
Singapore	100 %			2023
Slovakia	100 %			2023
Slovenia	100 %			2023
South Korea	100 %			2023
Spain	100 %			2023
Sri Lanka	100 %			2023
Sweden	100 %			2023
Switzerland	100 %			2023
Tajikistan	100 %			2023
Thailand	100 %			2023
Timor-Leste	100 %			2023
Tonga	100 %			2023
Tunisia	100 %			2023
Turks and Caicos Islands	100 %			2023
Turkey	100 %			2023
Turkmenistan	100 %			2023
Tuvalu	100 %			2023
Ukraine	100 %			2023
United Arab Emirates	100 %			2023
United Kingdom	100 %			2023
United States	100 %			2023
Uruguay	100 %			2023
Vietnam	100 %			2023
Jordan	99.9 %	100 %	98.8 %	2023
Uzbekistan	99.9 %	100 %	99.8 %	2023
Bolivia	99.8 %	99.9 %	99.6 %	2023
South Africa	99.7 %	99.8 %	99.5 %	2023
Belize	99.6 %	99.8 %	99.4 %	2023
Dominican Republic	99.6 %	100 %	98.2 %	2023
Pakistan	99.6 %	99.7 %	99.4 %	2023
Suriname	99.6 %	100 %	98.8 %	2023
India	99.4 %	99.6 %	99.3 %	2023
Fiji	99.3 %	100 %	98.3 %	2023
Philippines	99.1 %	99.2 %	99.1 %	2023
Guyana	98.9 %	98.9 %	91.6%	2023
Indonesia	98.7 %	99.1 %	98.2 %	2023
Trinidad and Tobago	98.7 %	99.3 %	98.0 %	2023
Cape Verde	98.6 %	96.5 %	96.9 %	2023
Peru	98.5 %	98.9 %	97.3 %	2023
El Salvador	98.3 %	99.4 %	96.6 %	2023
Venezuela	98.3 %	98.8 %	96.2 %	2023
Ecuador	97.9 %	98.7 %	95.1 %	2023
Namibia	97.4 %	98.7 %	81.3 %	2023
Gabon	97.1 %	99.2 %	81.2 %	2023
Laos	96.5 %	98.6 %	95.2 %	2023
Kiribati	95.9 %	86.0 %	94.3 %	2023
Honduras	95.6 %	100 %	88.8 %	2023
Bangladesh	95.3 %	97.3 %	94.6 %	2023
Cambodia	95.0 %	99.5 %	93.4 %	2023
Nepal	94.0 %	96.0 %	93.4 %	2023
Botswana	93.1 %	98.7 %	81.1 %	2023
Syria	92.5 %	100 %	72.8 %	2023
World	91.6 %	98.0 %	84.0 %	2023
Comoros	89.8 %	98.3 %	86.1 %	2023
Ghana	89.5 %	97.5 %	77.8 %	2023
Afghanistan	88.3 %	97.0 %	83.4 %	2023
Nicaragua	88.3 %	100 %	71.0 %	2023
Federated States of Micronesia	86.9 %	97.3 %	83.7 %	2023
Colombia	86.7 %	89.3 %	80.2 %	2023
Eswatini	86.4 %	91.0 %	84.9 %	2023
Yemen	83.6 %	96.1 %	75.3 %	2023
São Tomé and Príncipe	81.3 %	81.9 %	69.6 %	2023
Solomon Islands	81.3 %	81.2 %	81.3 %	2023
Kenya	76.2 %	96.0 %	67.9 %	2023
Myanmar	72.5 %	93.6 %	62.8 %	2021
Ivory Coast	71.1 %	94.9 %	45.2 %	2021
Libya	70.2 %	100 %	15.2 %	2021
Vanuatu	70.0 %	97.0 %	60.7 %	2021
Senegal	68.0 %	93.9 %	43.4 %	2021
Equatorial Guinea	66.8 %	90.3 %	1.4 %	2021
Cameroon	65.4 %	94.7 %	24.8 %	2021
Djibouti	65.4 %	73.5 %	36.6 %	2021
Gambia	63.7 %	82.6 %	31.2 %	2021
Sudan	61.8 %	84.2 %	49.4 %	2021
Nigeria	57.9 %	86.9 %	22.3 %	2021
Togo	55.7 %	96.3 %	24.7 %	2021
Ethiopia	54.2 %	94.3 %	42.8 %	2021
Mali	53.4 %	96.9 %	18.3 %	2021
North Korea	52.6 %	...	...	2021
Eritrea	52.5 %	75.7 %	35.7 %	2021
Lesotho	50.4 %	80.6 %	37.7 %	2021
Republic of the Congo	49.7 %	67.0 %	12.4 %	2021
Somalia	49.3 %	70.6 %	30.6 %	2021
Zimbabwe	49.0 %	85.3 %	31.6 %	2021
Rwanda	48.7 %	98.0 %	38.2 %	2023
Angola	51.1 %	76.2 %	7.3 %	2023
Mauritania	47.7 %	89.7 %	11.2 %	2021
Haiti	47.2 %	81.8 %	1.2 %	2021
Guinea	46.8 %	89.8 %	21.3 %	2021
Zambia	46.7 %	85.7 %	14.5 %	2021
Uganda	45.2 %	72.3 %	35.9 %	2021
Tanzania	42.7 %	77.3 %	23.3 %	2021
Benin	42.0 %	67.0 %	18.0 %	2021
Guinea-Bissau	35.8 %	60.5 %	15.8 %	2021
Madagascar	35.1 %	72.6 %	10.9 %	2021
Mozambique	31.5 %	77.4 %	3.8 %	2021
Liberia	29.8 %	49.5 %	8.1 %	2021
Sierra Leone	27.5 %	57.0 %	4.9 %	2021
Papua New Guinea	20.9 %	65.2 %	14.0 %	2021
Democratic Republic of the Congo	20.8 %	43.8 %	1.0 %	2021
Burkina Faso	19.0 %	67.6 %	5.6 %	2021
Niger	18.6 %	65.9 %	9.1 %	2021
Central African Republic	15.7 %	34.7 %	1.6 %	2021
Malawi	14.2 %	54.2 %	5.6 %	2021
Chad	12.0 %	48.1 %	0.4 %	2023
Burundi	11.6 %	65.0 %	2.3 %	2023
South Sudan	7.1 %	15.6 %	5.7 %	2021

== By region ==
Region	Share of population with access to electricity			Year
Region	in % (total population)	in % (urban population)	in % (rural population)	Year
North America	100 %	100 %	100 %	2021
European Union	100 %	100 %	100 %	2021
Europe and Central Asia	100 %	100 %	100 %	2021
South Asia	98.8 %	99.9 %	98.3 %	2021
East Asia and Pacific	98.2 %	99.8 %	96.8 %	2021
Latin America and Caribbean	98.1 %	99.5 %	96.5 %	2021
Middle East and North Africa	97.3 %	99.6 %	93.9 %	2021
Sub-Saharan Africa	50.6 %	80.7 %	30.4 %	2021

== Historical development ==
Country	Share of population with access to electricity in % (total population)						
Country	1990	1995	2000	2005	2010	2015	2020
Afghanistan				23.0	42.7	71.5	97.7
Albania	100.0	100.0	100.0	100.0	100.0	100.0	100.0
Algeria			99.3	99.6	99.9	100.0	100.0
Angola			24.2	28.2	33.4	42.0	47.0
Argentina	99.4	99.6	99.8	99.9	100.0	100.0	100.0
Armenia			98.9	99.8	99.8	100.0	100.0
Australia	100.0	100.0	100.0	100.0	100.0	100.0	100.0
Austria	100.0	100.0	100.0	100.0	100.0	100.0	100.0
Azerbaijan			98.9	99.3	99.9	100.0	100.0
Bangladesh	14.3	19.7	32.0	44.2	55.3	74.0	96.2
Belarus		100.0	100.0	100.0	100.0	100.0	100.0
Belgium	100.0	100.0	100.0	100.0	100.0	100.0	100.0
Benin			21.4	26.7	34.2	37.7	41.0
Bolivia	56.1	63.9	70.0	68.3	88.0	91.5	97.2
Bosnia and Herzegovina			100.0	100.0	100.0	100.0	100.0
Botswana	9.3	16.1	26.5	37.4	52.0	62.1	71.8
Brazil	89.3	91.7	94.4	97.1	99.3	100.0	100.0
Bulgaria	100.0	100.0	88.1	90.6	93.5	96.6	99.7
Burkina Faso	5.9	6.7	9.1	11.4	13.1	16.2	18.5
Burundi			3.0	3.2	5.3	7.9	9.1
Cambodia			16.6	20.5	31.1	62.7	86.4
Cameroon	27.6	36.1	41.0	47.4	53.3	58.6	64.3
Canada	100.0	100.0	100.0	100.0	100.0	100.0	100.0
Central African Republic		3.0	6.0	8.3	9.8	12.7	15.4
Chad			2.7	4.7	6.4	7.7	10.9
Chile	99.8	100.0	100.0	100.0	100.0	100.0	100.0
China			96.9	98.3	99.7	100.0	100.0
Colombia	72.4	77.9	83.3	95.2	96.3	97.8	99.2
Democratic Republic of the Congo			6.7	6.0	13.0	16.6	20.1
Republic of the Congo			29.4	33.8	40.0	44.3	48.7
Costa Rica		98.2	98.7	99.1	99.0	99.4	99.9
Cuba		94.7	97.0	97.0	97.8	99.4	99.9
Czech Republic	100.0	100.0	100.0	100.0	100.0	100.0	100.0
Denmark	100.0	100.0	100.0	100.0	100.0	100.0	100.0
Dominican Republic	76.4	84.8	88.8	90.1	98.1	98.6	100.0
Ecuador		89.8	93.5	95.8	97.5	98.8	98.8
Egypt		95.5	97.7	99.4	99.2	99.3	100.0
El Salvador	65.7	77.0	84.5	87.5	91.6	95.4	99.7
Eritrea		22.9	29.2	34.6	39.8	45.8	51.4
Estonia	100.0	100.0	100.0	100.0	100.0	100.0	100.0
Ethiopia			12.7	14.0	25.5	29.0	51.1
Finland	100.0	100.0	100.0	100.0	100.0	100.0	100.0
France	100.0	100.0	100.0	100.0	100.0	100.0	100.0
Gambia		20.0	34.3	30.5	47.3	54.7	62.2
Germany	100.0	100.0	100.0	100.0	100.0	100.0	100.0
Ghana		34.2	43.7	54.7	64.2	74.0	85.4
Greece	100.0	100.0	100.0	100.0	100.0	100.0	100.0
Guatemala		60.8	73.3	78.4	84.1	90.5	96.6
Guinea			15.5	20.2	28.1	34.9	44.7
Haiti		31.3	33.7	34.9	37.4	41.0	46.3
Honduras		66.1	67.4	68.9	81.0	90.0	93.1
Hungary	100.0	100.0	100.0	100.0	100.0	100.0	100.0
India		50.6	59.1	71.2	82.3	91.6	100.0
Indonesia	43.6	66.9	86.3	85.7	94.2	97.5	97.9
Iran			97.9	98.4	99.0	100.0	100.0
Iraq			96.8	97.4	98.4	99.4	100.0
Ireland	100.0	100.0	100.0	100.0	100.0	100.0	100.0
Israel	100.0	100.0	100.0	100.0	100.0	100.0	100.0
Italy	100.0	100.0	100.0	100.0	100.0	100.0	100.0
Ivory Coast	36.7	42.3	47.6	58.9	58.0	62.6	69.9
Jamaica	70.3	80.4	84.4	88.2	92.2	94.9	99.7
Japan	100.0	100.0	100.0	100.0	100.0	100.0	100.0
Jordan	96.8	98.2	98.7	98.9	99.0	99.8	99.9
Kazakhstan		99.9	99.1	99.4	99.5	100.0	100.0
Kenya		4.5	15.4	26.0	19.2	41.6	71.5
South Korea		100.0	100.0	100.0	100.0	100.0	100.0
Laos		25.0	43.1	57.2	70.6	89.7	99.3
Latvia			100.0	100.0	100.0	100.0	100.0
Lebanon				99.6	99.9	100.0	100.0
Liberia					5.3	15.2	27.6
Lithuania		100.0	100.0	100.0	100.0	100.0	100.0
Madagascar	8.2	11.0	12.6	16.0	12.8	23.8	32.0
Malawi	2.1	2.3	4.8	6.8	8.7	10.8	11.5
Malaysia					99.2	100.0	100.0
Mali			9.4	18.7	27.8	37.6	50.6
Mauritania				18.2	33.7	39.5	45.4
Mexico	92.3	96.3	98.7	99.2	99.4	100.0	100.0
Mongolia			67.3	86.2	78.5	88.0	99.5
Morocco	46.2	56.5	69.7	79.5	91.5	99.6	100.0
Mozambique			6.0	12.1	18.0	24.0	30.6
Myanmar				47.4	48.8	60.5	70.4
Namibia		30.0	36.5	39.8	44.4	51.6	52.3
Nepal			27.7	46.5	68.6	82.0	89.9
Netherlands	100.0	100.0	100.0	100.0	100.0	100.0	100.0
New Zealand	100.0	100.0	100.0	100.0	100.0	100.0	100.0
Nicaragua		69.3	72.8	73.8	79.1	83.2	86.0
Niger	4.2	6.2	6.5	7.1	12.9	16.6	18.7
Nigeria	27.3	38.4	42.9	47.1	48.0	52.5	55.4
Norway	100.0	100.0	100.0	100.0	100.0	100.0	100.0
Oman	100.0	100.0	100.0	100.0	100.0	100.0	100.0
Pakistan			72.8	78.1	87.1	91.0	94.5
Panama	70.2	76.0	81.4	85.6	86.8	91.6	95.3
Papua New Guinea			8.7	19.1	19.5	18.4	20.5
Paraguay		77.5	89.2	94.7	97.4	99.3	99.7
Peru		67.4	72.5	77.2	88.1	93.9	96.2
Philippines	59.8	69.2	74.8	80.1	85.2	89.1	96.2
Poland	100.0	100.0	100.0	100.0	100.0	100.0	100.0
Portugal	100.0	100.0	100.0	100.0	100.0	100.0	100.0
Romania			100.0	100.0	100.0	100.0	100.0
Russia			100.0	100.0	100.0	100.0	100.0
Rwanda	4.4	0.1	6.2	4.8	9.7	22.8	45.2
Saudi Arabia	100.0	100.0	100.0	100.0	100.0	100.0	100.0
Senegal		29.0	37.7	47.1	56.5	60.5	64.3
Serbia		100.0	99.9	99.7	99.7	99.9	100.0
Singapore	100.0	100.0	100.0	100.0	100.0	100.0	100.0
Slovakia	100.0	100.0	100.0	100.0	100.0	100.0	100.0
Slovenia	100.0	100.0	100.0	100.0	100.0	100.0	100.0
Somalia			2.1	15.0	21.0	45.3	49.9
South Africa			71.8	80.9	82.9	85.5	90.0
Spain		100.0	100.0	100.0	100.0	100.0	100.0
Sri Lanka				88.7	95.6	99.6	100.0
Sudan			23.0	30.5	36.0	48.0	59.7
Sweden	100.0	100.0	100.0	100.0	100.0	100.0	100.0
Switzerland	100.0	100.0	100.0	100.0	100.0	100.0	100.0
Tanzania		7.2	8.7	13.8	14.8	26.2	39.9
Thailand			82.1	92.7	99.7	99.6	100.0
Togo			17.0	26.7	30.8	44.7	54.1
Tunisia		88.7	94.8	99.3	99.5	99.9	99.9
Turkey					100.0	100.0	100.0
Uganda		6.8	7.7	8.9	12.1	18.5	42.1
Ukraine			100.0	100.0	100.0	100.0	100.0
United Arab Emirates	100.0	100.0	100.0	100.0	100.0	100.0	100.0
United Kingdom	100.0	100.0	100.0	100.0	100.0	100.0	100.0
United States	100.0	100.0	100.0	100.0	100.0	100.0	100.0
Uruguay		97.9	98.5	98.8	99.1	99.7	100.0
Venezuela		99.0	98.9	98.9	98.9	100.0	100.0
Vietnam			87.2	96.1	98.5	99.8	100.0
Yemen		43.6	50.0	56.1	73.7	71.2	73.9
Zambia		15.6	16.7	22.6	22.0	31.1	44.6
Zimbabwe	25.6	31.9	33.9	35.6	39.8	33.7	52.7
