= List of countries by antidepressant consumption =

This is a list of countries by antidepressant consumption according to data published by the OECD.

== OECD list ==
The source for the data below is the OECD Health Statistics 2018, released by the OECD in June 2018 and updated on 8 November 2018.

The unit of measurement used by the OECD is defined daily dose (DDD), defined as "the assumed average maintenance dose per day for a drug used on its main indication in adults". The sources used by the OECD are primarily national health authorities. Definitions, sources and methodology per country is explained further in a document available on the OECD website. The OECD have not included the United States in these reviews, but if added the country would have the highest or second-highest rate.

Country	Defined daily dosage per 1,000 inhabitants per day	Year	Data include drugs dispensed in hospitals	Data include non- reimbursed drugs	Data include OTC drugs	Notes
Iceland	141.4	2017	Yes	Yes	Yes	
Australia	106.7	2016	No	Yes	No	
Portugal	103.6	2017	No	Yes (Note: Data include both reimbursed and non-reimbursed products.)	Yes (Note: Yes, but only OTC products sold in pharmacies.)	
United Kingdom	100.1	2016	No	No	—N/a	
Canada	99.6	2017	No	No	See note (Note: Generally, claims for OTC drugs are not reimbursed, but OTC drugs are not explicitly excluded.)	(Note: Provisional value.)
Sweden	96.8	2017	Yes	Yes	Yes (Note: Data include OTC drugs both from pharmacies and from other retailers.)	
Belgium	79.0	2016	No	No	No	
Denmark	77.0	2015	Yes	Yes	Yes	
Spain	75.5	2016	No	No	No	
New Zealand	72.8	2014	—N/a	—N/a	—N/a	(Note: Difference in methodology.)
Finland	67.6	2016	Yes (Note: Data are based on wholesale of pharmaceuticals.)	Yes	Yes	
Austria	60.5	2016	No (Note: Drug consumption in hospitals and in hospital ambulances is excluded.)	See note (Note: Data cover only drugs reimbursed by the sickness funds within the statutory health insurance.)	No	
Slovenia	58.6	2016	No	See note (Note: Data include all medicines with a medical prescription – compulsory health insurance, regardless of the reimbursement.)	See note (Note: Only OTC drugs with a medical prescription.)	
Norway	57.1	2017	Yes	Yes	Yes	
Czech Republic	57.1	2016	Yes	Yes	Yes	
Germany	56.5	2016	No	See note (Note: Data contain exclusively the drug consumption debited to the statutory health insurance (i.e. drugs reimbursed by German Statutory Health Insurance).)	No	
Luxembourg	52.7	2017	No	No	No	
France	49.8	2009	Yes (Note: Data include drug consumption both in hospitals and in pharmacies.)	Yes	Yes	
Israel	49.2	2017	No	No	No	
Greece	48.1	2015	No	No	No	
Netherlands	46.1	2016	No	No	No	
Chile	41.4	2017	Yes	—N/a	Yes	
Turkey	41.0	2016	No	Yes	See note (Note: Data include drugs dispensed in pharmacies and non-reimbursed drugs.)	
Italy	40.3	2017	—N/a	No	No	(Note: Estimated value.)
Slovakia	38.9	2016	Yes	Yes	Yes	
Hungary	28.8	2017	No	No	No	
Estonia	28.8	2017	Yes	Yes	Yes	
South Korea	19.9	2016	Yes	Yes	Yes	
Latvia	13.3	2016	—N/a	—N/a	—N/a	

== See also ==
- Antidepressant
- List of countries by suicide rate
