= List of countries by semiconductor exports =

The following is a list of countries by semiconductor exports, using the Harmonised System code 8541. This includes diodes, transistors, semiconductor−based transducers, photosensitive semiconductor devices, including photovoltaic cells whether or not assembled in modules or made up into panels (excluding photovoltaic generators), light emitting diodes (LED), whether or not assembled with other LEDs, mounted piezoelectric crystals, and parts thereof.

== International Trade Map ==
Data is for 2024, in thousands of United States dollars and tons/units.

List of countries by semiconductor exports (2024)
| Country | Value exported (thousands USD) | Trade balance (thousands USD) | Quantity exported | |
| Country | Value exported (thousands USD) | Trade balance (thousands USD) | Value | Units |
|---|---|---|---|---|
| World | 140,442,103 | −7,694,841 | – | – |
| China | 47,680,846 | 22,285,806 | 12,855,905 | Tons |
| Hong Kong | 15,956,782 | −462,610 | – | – |
| Singapore | 11,043,064 | 5,115,521 | – | – |
| Vietnam | 7,948,060 | 4,978,489 | – | – |
| Malaysia | 7,827,634 | 4,126,599 | – | – |
| Germany | 7,745,763 | −41,861 | 172,671 | Tons |
| Japan | 7,300,983 | 3,686,567 | – | – |
| United States | 5,457,704 | −16,935,685 | 12,073,448,838 | Units |
| Taiwan | 4,476,035 | 1,734,359 | 15,137 | Tons |
| Thailand | 3,699,113 | 1,381,727 | 34,292,837,665 | Units |
| South Korea | 3,583,980 | −1,267,627 | 44,566 | Tons |
| Netherlands | 1,935,250 | −616,043 | 448,549 | Tons |
| India | 1,780,009 | −4,499,909 | 297,078,590 | Units |
| Italy | 1,188,966 | −867,439 | 35,342 | Tons |
| Austria | 1,151,818 | 353,821 | 84 | No quantity |
| France | 1,057,058 | −872,574 | 35,699 | Tons |
| Philippines | 876,505 | −924,888 | 10,203 | Tons |
| Cambodia | 831,238 | 542,380 | 209,696 | Tons |
| Morocco | 749,181 | 267,887 | – | – |
| Indonesia | 746,512 | 171,110 | 144,186 | Tons |
| Switzerland | 729,574 | 134,196 | 2,636 | Tons |
| Hungary | 708,105 | −608,813 | 24,893 | Tons |
| United Kingdom | 672,363 | −642,010 | 5,119 | Tons |
| Belgium | 660,832 | −241,428 | 168,103 | Tons |
| Portugal | 634,809 | −350,990 | 161,036 | Tons |
| Mexico | 558,411 | −3,081,068 | 35,842 | Tons |
| Czech Republic | 407,202 | −225,665 | 29,522 | Tons |
| Laos | 402,600 | 370,109 | – | – |
| Sweden | 280,514 | −16,932 | – | – |
| Turkey | 268,762 | −632,049 | 47,020 | Tons |
| Spain | 232,658 | −1,881,654 | 45,387 | Tons |
| Greece | 219,051 | −772,359 | 83,570 | Tons |
| Israel | 214,108 | −220,360 | – | – |
| Poland | 189,080 | −1,078,169 | 50,704 | Tons |
| Canada | 175,438 | −355,007 | – | – |
| Ireland | 158,560 | −54,744 | 2,309 | Tons |
| Slovenia | 101,918 | −62,741 | 17,395 | Tons |
| Slovakia | 88,346 | −205,206 | 2,032 | Tons |
| Denmark | 87,125 | −158,326 | 2,495 | Tons |
| Australia | 73,988 | −797,569 | – | – |
| South Africa | 64,850 | −338,374 | – | – |
| Romania | 55,250 | −899,878 | – | – |
| Finland | 41,215 | −125,609 | 440 | Tons |
| New Zealand | 40,803 | −58,310 | 107 | Tons |
| Lithuania | 37,803 | −204,482 | 5,703 | Tons |
| Bulgaria | 35,235 | −339,403 | 6,530 | Tons |
| Namibia | 25,374 | −13,360 | 9,929 | Tons |
| Croatia | 25,299 | −77,175 | 4,195 | Tons |
| Luxembourg | 24,620 | −22,495 | 4,130 | Tons |
| United Arab Emirates | 22,183 | −587,189 | – | – |
| Russia | 21,051 | −212,213 | – | – |
| Estonia | 18,729 | −93,209 | 725 | Tons |
| Brazil | 18,443 | −3,010,725 | 503 | Tons |
| Jordan | 13,199 | −61,939 | – | – |
| Panama | 11,578 | −123,222 | 3,496 | Tons |
| Kazakhstan | 8,462 | −18,158 | 115 | Tons |
| Tunisia | 7,486 | −143,396 | – | – |
| Dominican Republic | 7,402 | −192,718 | 471 | Tons |
| Norway | 6,862 | −110,998 | 882 | Tons |
| Latvia | 5,811 | −53,431 | 898 | Tons |
| Bahrain | 4,822 | −122,486 | – | – |
| Serbia | 4,513 | −125,481 | 191 | Tons |
| Kenya | 3,651 | −41,921 | 581 | Tons |
| Bosnia and Herzegovina | 3,372 | −74,351 | 1,168 | Tons |
| Ukraine | 3,304 | −323,055 | 49 | Tons |
| Bangladesh | 2,818 | −121,526 | – | – |
| Venezuela | 1,397 | −1,486 | – | – |
| Uzbekistan | 1,336 | −494,167 | 146,312 | Units |
| Saudi Arabia | 1,197 | −1,766,903 | 259 | Tons |
| Colombia | 1,143 | −191,644 | 260 | Tons |
| Zambia | 1,106 | −1,102 | 411 | Tons |
| Chile | 1,090 | −85,586 | – | – |
| Guatemala | 1,086 | −43,052 | 166 | Tons |
| Egypt | 1,085 | −213,703 | – | – |
| Pakistan | 1,066 | −2,212,250 | 24,536 | Units |
| New Caledonia | 950 | −1,614 | – | – |
| Senegal | 826 | −25,853 | 195 | Tons |
| North Macedonia | 813 | −81,176 | 121 | Tons |
| Nigeria | 808 | −178,501 | – | – |
| Tanzania | 664 | −38,069 | 132 | Tons |
| Belarus | 592 | −3,424 | – | – |
| Lebanon | 587 | −55,230 | – | – |
| Cameroon | 566 | −37,864 | – | – |
| Costa Rica | 476 | −20,930 | 27 | Tons |
| El Salvador | 470 | −14,197 | 309 | Tons |
| Uganda | 457 | −27,722 | 139 | Tons |
| Burkina Faso | 454 | −32,358 | 1,324 | Tons |
| Zimbabwe | 422 | −47,822 | 114 | Tons |
| Mali | 398 | −24,983 | – | – |
| Chad | 332 | −6,192 | 4,240 | Units |
| Mozambique | 331 | −22,376 | 8 | Tons |
| Barbados | 312 | −6,448 | 34 | Tons |
| Myanmar | 311 | −62,743 | 7,860,301 | Units |
| British Indian Ocean Territory | 301 | 296 | – | – |
| Sri Lanka | 293 | −48,289 | – | – |
| Moldova | 257 | −51,239 | 26 | Tons |
| Armenia | 240 | −66,060 | 40 | Tons |
| Iran | 231 | −78,538 | – | – |
| Côte d'Ivoire | 230 | −27,637 | 75 | Tons |
| Rwanda | 191 | −1,452 | – | – |
| Nicaragua | 183 | −10,395 | 86 | Tons |
| North Korea | 168 | 168 | – | – |
| Ecuador | 166 | −14,927 | 34 | Tons |
| Sierra Leone | 152 | −12,472 | – | – |
| Honduras | 140 | −13,466 | 8 | Tons |
| Botswana | 132 | −13,624 | 46 | Tons |
| Malta | 120 | −5,815 | 8 | Tons |
| Peru | 114 | −83,899 | 18 | Tons |
| Ghana | 112 | −33,835 | – | – |
| Togo | 104 | −5,784 | 21 | Tons |
| Fiji | 103 | −3,524 | – | – |
| Cyprus | 95 | −30,091 | 14 | Tons |
| Qatar | 95 | −85,859 | – | – |
| Cayman Islands | 81 | −1,547 | 5 | Tons |
| Mauritius | 75 | −5,947 | 19,355 | Units |
| Uruguay | 75 | −4,015 | 17 | Tons |
| Kyrgyzstan | 66 | −2,047 | 18 | Tons |
| Jamaica | 54 | −8,329 | 1 | Tons |
| Algeria | 49 | −42,285 | – | – |
| Georgia | 44 | −15,250 | 7 | Tons |
| Montenegro | 43 | −10,310 | 13 | Tons |
| Tokelau | 43 | 43 | 4,524 | Units |
| Madagascar | 36 | −48,153 | 45 | Tons |
| Malawi | 34 | −8,278 | 23 | Tons |
| Guyana | 34 | −14,408 | – | – |
| Andorra | 34 | −650 | – | – |
| Bahamas | 32 | −9,149 | 1,671 | Units |
| Ethiopia | 29 | −10,162 | – | – |
| Kuwait | 28 | −2,466 | 105 | Tons |
| Niue | 25 | 25 | – | – |
| Dominica | 24 | −278 | – | – |
| Eswatini | 24 | −985 | – | – |
| Curaçao | 22 | −1,965 | – | – |
| Paraguay | 18 | −3,620 | 7 | Tons |
| Guinea | 18 | −10,616 | 5 | Tons |
| Gibraltar | 16 | −97 | – | – |
| Angola | 15 | −41,642 | – | – |
| Vanuatu | 15 | −1,722 | – | – |
| Iraq | 15 | −51,956 | 1 | Tons |
| Libya | 13 | −1,817 | 2 | Tons |
| British Virgin Islands | 12 | −205 | – | – |
| Sint Maarten (Dutch part) | 11 | −260 | 1 | Tons |
| Afghanistan | 10 | −61,980 | – | – |
| Iceland | 10 | −3,121 | 22 | Tons |
| Brunei | 9 | −3,547 | 12 | Units |
| Micronesia | 8 | −263 | – | – |
| Oman | 7 | −286,855 | – | – |
| United States Minor Outlying Islands | 7 | −1,431 | – | – |
| Burundi | 6 | −2,661 | 9 | Tons |
| Palestine | 5 | −363 | – | – |
| Saint Lucia | 5 | −506 | – | – |
| Suriname | 5 | −1,155 | – | – |
| Sao Tome and Principe | 4 | −345 | – | – |
| Montserrat | 4 | 4 | – | – |
| Liberia | 4 | −2,824 | – | – |
| Gabon | 4 | −1,795 | – | – |
| Greenland | 4 | −233 | – | – |
| DR Congo | 4 | −24,840 | – | – |
| Azerbaijan | 3 | −4,611 | 2 | Tons |
| Bhutan | 3 | −3,822 | – | – |
| Niger | 3 | −9,231 | 7 | Tons |
| Nepal | 3 | −4,252 | – | – |
| Aruba | 2 | −1,245 | – | – |
| Christmas Island | 2 | −27 | – | – |
| Congo | 2 | −1,586 | – | – |
| Gambia | 2 | −653 | 11 | Tons |
| Trinidad and Tobago | 2 | −28,799 | – | – |
| Wallis and Futuna | 2 | −42 | – | – |
| French Southern and Antarctic Territories | 1 | −173 | – | – |
| Faroe Islands | 1 | −116 | – | – |
| Nauru | 1 | −5 | – | – |
| Saint Vincent and the Grenadines | 1 | −449 | – | – |
| Pitcairn | 1 | −4 | – | – |
| Timor-Leste | 1 | −112 | – | – |
| Lesotho | 1 | −683 | – | – |

== Observatory of Economic Complexity ==
Data is for 2023, in United States dollar.

List of countries by semiconductor exports (2023)
| Country | Trade value |
|---|---|
| China | 59,938,301,612 |
| Malaysia | 11,483,152,988 |
| Germany | 9,684,369,481 |
| Japan | 8,514,374,343 |
| Vietnam | 7,937,045,988 |
| Thailand | 6,994,506,481 |
| Singapore | 6,651,887,686 |
| United States | 6,174,972,672 |
| Taiwan | 5,159,307,298 |
| South Korea | 3,853,617,596 |
| Philippines | 3,692,799,819 |
| Netherlands | 3,069,568,457 |
| Cambodia | 2,510,285,713 |
| India | 2,007,906,555 |
| Austria | 1,688,091,866 |
| Italy | 1,262,764,796 |
| France | 1,234,343,215 |
| Mexico | 1,221,481,277 |
| Hong Kong | 1,183,578,200 |
| United Kingdom | 812,133,924 |
| Hungary | 811,660,070 |
| Morocco | 756,839,060 |
| Israel | 626,970,305 |
| Switzerland | 546,009,902 |
| Turkey | 540,506,023 |
| Denmark | 492,453,801 |
| Spain | 485,195,264 |
| Czech Republic | 441,824,232 |
| Indonesia | 440,283,085 |
| Belgium | 435,687,382 |
| Portugal | 406,198,691 |
| Canada | 348,488,326 |
| Slovenia | 313,874,734 |
| Greece | 254,415,573 |
| Ireland | 219,889,796 |
| Slovakia | 197,049,981 |
| Sweden | 185,589,138 |
| Poland | 174,809,246 |
| United Arab Emirates | 172,325,584 |
| Jordan | 99,375,161 |
| Russia | 78,452,097 |
| Australia | 77,468,285 |
| Lithuania | 69,798,210 |
| Croatia | 51,356,401 |
| New Zealand | 51,355,566 |
| Romania | 49,624,288 |
| Bulgaria | 47,989,318 |
| Finland | 41,729,084 |
| Luxembourg | 34,501,130 |
| South Africa | 29,879,346 |
| Brazil | 27,403,807 |
| Kazakhstan | 25,112,795 |
| Armenia | 25,071,508 |
| Estonia | 19,034,176 |
| Namibia | 16,398,924 |
| Cyprus | 14,409,674 |
| Ukraine | 13,460,013 |
| Dominican Republic | 11,649,656 |
| Costa Rica | 9,380,449 |
| Latvia | 8,631,778 |
| Serbia | 8,136,206 |
| Tunisia | 8,028,015 |
| Kenya | 6,583,073 |
| Norway | 6,416,520 |
| Malta | 5,789,933 |
| Sri Lanka | 5,681,406 |
| Laos | 4,555,233 |
| Saudi Arabia | 4,338,710 |
| Myanmar | 3,630,481 |
| Georgia | 3,135,233 |
| Bangladesh | 2,935,586 |
| Bosnia and Herzegovina | 2,675,767 |
| Bahrain | 2,438,238 |
| North Macedonia | 2,386,368 |
| Kyrgyzstan | 2,372,102 |
| North Korea | 2,268,540 |
| Venezuela | 1,874,971 |
| Oman | 1,868,564 |
| Chile | 1,592,883 |
| Mauritius | 1,506,666 |
| Macau | 1,437,365 |
| Uzbekistan | 1,232,196 |
| Samoa | 1,131,889 |
| Montenegro | 1,086,369 |
| Colombia | 1,029,848 |
| Panama | 887,374 |
| Cape Verde | 826,473 |
| Moldova | 771,242 |
| Albania | 762,072 |
| Turks and Caicos Islands | 707,779 |
| Malawi | 682,319 |
| Honduras | 658,006 |
| Uganda | 641,888 |
| Mozambique | 606,334 |
| Benin | 593,451 |
| Egypt | 535,708 |
| Senegal | 535,261 |
| Burkina Faso | 509,603 |
| Tanzania | 506,553 |
| Belarus | 499,792 |
| Lebanon | 496,994 |
| El Salvador | 443,980 |
| Pakistan | 394,887 |
| Nigeria | 384,392 |
| Zambia | 370,334 |
| Iran | 361,953 |
| Fiji | 322,789 |
| Qatar | 319,288 |
| Seychelles | 307,566 |
| Argentina | 270,170 |
| Sierra Leone | 264,985 |
| Peru | 247,759 |
| Mali | 224,634 |
| Cote d'Ivoire | 221,938 |
| Curacao | 219,387 |
| Eswatini | 199,831 |
| Ethiopia | 196,251 |
| Iceland | 192,745 |
| Ghana | 177,597 |
| DR Congo | 174,050 |
| Ecuador | 168,047 |
| Kuwait | 158,029 |
| Rwanda | 155,827 |
| Niger | 144,580 |
| Botswana | 143,023 |
| Paraguay | 123,010 |
| New Caledonia | 112,467 |
| Cameroon | 110,156 |
| Togo | 106,983 |
| Cook Islands | 103,253 |
| Guatemala | 87,462 |
| Bahamas | 81,289 |
| Andorra | 80,005 |
| Sao Tome and Principe | 78,835 |
| Saint Helena | 75,974 |
| Tokelau | 69,365 |
| Uruguay | 66,005 |
| Nicaragua | 58,590 |
| Gambia | 53,446 |
| Papua New Guinea | 48,667 |
| Sudan | 42,374 |
| Mauritania | 36,555 |
| Jamaica | 26,694 |
| Brunei | 25,555 |
| Tuvalu | 22,055 |
| Barbados | 19,967 |
| Gibraltar | 18,596 |
| Guinea | 18,239 |
| American Samoa | 16,244 |
| Timor-Leste | 15,766 |
| Algeria | 15,622 |
| San Marino | 15,436 |
| Niue | 15,042 |
| Gabon | 14,209 |
| Syria | 13,271 |
| Micronesia | 11,915 |
| Dominica | 11,539 |
| Azerbaijan | 9,465 |
| Marshall Islands | 8,717 |
| Libya | 8,654 |
| Madagascar | 8,218 |
| Antigua and Barbuda | 7,577 |
| Liberia | 7,129 |
| French Polynesia | 6,484 |
| Nepal | 5,883 |
| Afghanistan | 5,346 |
| Belize | 5,200 |
| Zimbabwe | 4,849 |
| Central African Republic | 4,601 |
| Saint Kitts and Nevis | 4,315 |
| Trinidad and Tobago | 3,847 |
| Djibouti | 3,551 |
| Christmas Island | 3,474 |
| Angola | 3,442 |
| Congo | 3,291 |
| Somalia | 3,251 |
| Tajikistan | 2,828 |
| Yemen | 2,753 |
| Saint Vincent and the Grenadines | 2,518 |
| Haiti | 2,479 |
| Cocos (Keeling) Islands | 2,429 |
| Guyana | 2,397 |
| British Virgin Islands | 2,015 |
| Iraq | 1,777 |
| Montserrat | 1,712 |
| Pitcairn Islands | 1,688 |
| Lesotho | 1,541 |
| Suriname | 1,500 |
| Comoros | 895 |
| Chad | 836 |
| Guinea-Bissau | 758 |
| Maldives | 593 |
| Saint Lucia | 412 |
| Saint Pierre and Miquelon | 378 |
| Bolivia | 202 |
| Vanuatu | 154 |
| Northern Mariana Islands | 152 |
| Aruba | 130 |
| Nauru | 128 |
| Greenland | 126 |
| Grenada | 110 |
| Palau | 57 |
| Anguilla | 4 |
| Cuba | 4 |
| Cayman Islands | 1 |

== See also ==
- Solar power by country
