= List of countries by live animal exports =

The following is a list of countries by live animal exports, using the Harmonised System Code 01.

== Animal types ==
Country	Main exports
France	Cattle, Horse, Pig, Chicken and Bovine
Netherlands	Pig, Horse, Chicken and Cattle
Denmark	Pig, Cattle, Chicken and Horse
Germany	Chicken, Cattle, Horses, Pig and Turkey
Canada	Cattle, Pig, Horse, Bison and Turkey
Australia	Cattle, Horse and Sheep
United States	Chicken, Horse and Cattle
Mexico	Cattle, Bovine and Horse
Spain	Cattle, Pig, Sheep and Chicken
Belgium	Pig, Cattle, Chicken and Insects
United Kingdom	Horse, Chicken, Sheep and Turkey
Hong Kong	Horse and Reptiles
China	Pig, Bovine, Primates and Reptiles
Ireland	Horse, Cattle and Pig
Sudan	Sheep, Bovine, Goat and Camel
Romania	Sheep, Cattle, Chicken and Bovine
Hungary	Cattle, Chicken, Sheep and Pig
Brazil	Cattle, Chicken and Bovine
Thailand	Cattle, Pig and Bison
Czech Republic	Cattle, Pig, Chicken, Goose and Turkey

== International Trade Centre ==
Data is for 2024, in thousands of United States dollars.

List of countries by live animal exports (2024)
Country	Value exported (thousands USD)	Value imported (thousands USD)	Trade balance (thousands USD)
World	28,426,609	29,170,629	−744,020
France	2,838,275	411,904	2,426,371
Canada	2,501,794	712,415	1,789,379
Netherlands	2,431,871	1,657,643	774,228
Denmark	2,009,132	58,896	1,950,236
Germany	1,545,917	1,626,221	−80,304
Mexico	1,300,551	199,021	1,101,530
United States	1,278,110	4,804,903	−3,526,793
Belgium	1,032,010	640,835	391,175
Brazil	957,227	14,639	942,588
Hong Kong	938,303	1,487,451	−549,148
Spain	897,586	1,014,097	−116,511
Ireland	876,537	435,817	440,720
Sudan	862,952	0	862,952
United Kingdom	773,116	868,016	−94,900
Australia	737,309	130,989	606,320
Hungary	619,953	412,033	207,920
Romania	545,675	234,973	310,702
Czech Republic	512,213	67,369	444,844
China	488,384	300,292	188,092
Somalia	356,393	377	356,016
Portugal	352,521	270,275	82,246
Uruguay	303,772	7,044	296,728
Croatia	254,945	262,604	−7,659
Slovakia	247,750	76,539	171,211
Malaysia	241,713	60,256	181,457
Bulgaria	211,245	16,982	194,263
Colombia	199,682	22,519	177,163
Thailand	199,548	39,149	160,399
Austria	160,013	293,155	−133,142
New Zealand	148,853	48,188	100,665
Lithuania	146,989	56,978	90,011
Poland	142,211	1,404,093	−1,261,882
Jordan	123,672	211,403	−87,731
Russia	117,869	33,432	84,437
Vietnam	115,918	203,594	−87,676
Namibia	114,982	2,822	112,160
Slovenia	113,041	52,237	60,804
Latvia	106,771	37,359	69,412
Mauritius	104,147	24,560	79,587
Djibouti	103,756	0	103,756
Georgia	100,365	59,917	40,448
Iran	81,449	12,665	68,784
Italy	78,117	2,748,990	−2,670,873
Turkey	76,493	736,112	−659,619
Saudi Arabia	70,598	1,505,785	−1,435,187
South Africa	55,416	166,951	−111,535
Estonia	54,282	7,963	46,319
Kyrgyzstan	48,942	13,028	35,914
Armenia	47,825	16,494	31,331
Sweden	47,157	30,747	16,410
Serbia	43,788	40,873	2,915
Luxembourg	42,006	18,902	23,104
Botswana	38,915	7,112	31,803
Japan	38,468	286,347	−247,879
Ukraine	38,066	86,716	−48,650
Syria	34,027	47,740	−13,713
Kazakhstan	32,396	52,620	−20,224
Switzerland	27,716	147,426	−119,710
Egypt	25,133	490,398	−465,265
Morocco	24,831	458,330	−433,499
United Arab Emirates	22,404	155,427	−133,023
Greece	22,244	86,782	−64,538
Uganda	20,576	16,384	4,192
India	19,909	24,148	−4,239
Burkina Faso	19,493	1,297	18,196
Israel	18,830	371,784	−352,954
Kenya	16,880	16,701	179
Moldova	16,864	10,304	6,560
Zambia	14,632	8,281	6,351
Chile	13,672	13,667	5
Argentina	13,516	33,917	−20,401
Costa Rica	11,271	12,125	−854
Uzbekistan	10,620	169,763	−159,143
Qatar	10,359	72,683	−62,324
Guatemala	10,278	30,416	−20,138
Iceland	10,009	836	9,173
El Salvador	9,806	12,930	−3,124
Oman	9,608	13,364	−3,756
Tanzania	8,583	9,988	−1,405
Norway	8,222	19,600	−11,378
Niger	8,088	70	8,018
Kuwait	7,439	178,553	−171,114
South Korea	7,180	78,146	−70,966
Finland	6,754	13,185	−6,431
Peru	6,539	27,341	−20,802
Belize	5,975	1,525	4,450
Mongolia	5,736	2,255	3,481
Indonesia	5,414	566,363	−560,949
Tajikistan	5,414	8,672	−3,258
Taiwan	5,294	14,190	−8,896
Singapore	4,318	203,389	−199,071
Nicaragua	3,754	15,639	−11,885
Belarus	3,737	17,205	−13,468
Philippines	3,660	29,115	−25,455
North Macedonia	3,553	11,426	−7,873
Cyprus	3,338	1,021	2,317
Zimbabwe	2,946	12,400	−9,454
Bosnia and Herzegovina	2,856	51,524	−48,668
Barbados	2,601	228	2,373
Nigeria	2,095	8,435	−6,340
Pakistan	2,032	12,543	−10,511
Ghana	1,790	25,213	−23,423
Ecuador	1,666	32,206	−30,540
Eswatini	1,562	748	814
Malawi	1,250	2,979	−1,729
Guyana	1,134	576	558
Angola	1,130	5,110	−3,980
Seychelles	1,075	417	658
Suriname	1,038	525	513
Sri Lanka	894	5,212	−4,318
Tunisia	737	33,747	−33,010
Venezuela	733	17,711	−16,978
Panama	623	11,836	−11,213
DR Congo	598	17,033	−16,435
Lebanon	541	208,769	−208,228
Congo	475	815	−340
Laos	454	79,325	−78,871
Cambodia	451	39,501	−39,050
Azerbaijan	448	88,450	−88,002
Albania	442	77,725	−77,283
Malta	343	283	60
Mali	307	5,238	−4,931
Madagascar	299	2,036	−1,737
Bahrain	277	8,798	−8,521
South Sudan	237	2,160	−1,923
Rwanda	233	1,585	−1,352
Senegal	219	6,420	−6,201
Saint Kitts and Nevis	202	92	110
Solomon Islands	198	39	159
Eritrea	190	528	−338
Cameroon	189	5,191	−5,002
Dominican Republic	136	8,600	−8,464
Cuba	125	2	123
Afghanistan	124	2,269	−2,145
Montenegro	119	50,880	−50,761
Curaçao	83	351	−268
Myanmar	83	2,580	−2,497
Honduras	80	17,251	−17,171
Côte d'Ivoire	68	40,374	−40,306
Fiji	57	2,910	−2,853
Trinidad and Tobago	52	2,604	−2,552
Iraq	45	545,221	−545,176
Guinea	43	2,010	−1,967
Saint Lucia	40	191	−151
Ethiopia	38	8,237	−8,199
Tonga	37	108	−71
Saint Vincent and the Grenadines	36	179	−143
Benin	35	1,108	−1,073
Andorra	33	234	−201
Lesotho	29	3,279	−3,250
Bolivia	25	18,295	−18,270
Bahamas	22	747	−725
Christmas Island	20	0	20
Mozambique	20	9,259	−9,239
Antigua and Barbuda	18	113	−95
Libya	17	90,361	−90,344
Tokelau	17	0	17
Brunei	13	9,759	−9,746
Equatorial Guinea	13	57	−44
Jamaica	10	1,843	−1,833
New Caledonia	10	69	−59
United States Minor Outlying Islands	7	34	−27
Haiti	6	177	−171
Grenada	6	1,180	−1,174
Sierra Leone	5	299	−294
Togo	4	1,329	−1,325
Burundi	4	1,697	−1,693
Central African Republic	4	239	−235
Bangladesh	4	29,039	−29,035
British Virgin Islands	3	124	−121
Nepal	3	4,559	−4,556
Sint Maarten (Dutch part)	3	119	−116
Guinea-Bissau	3	17	−14
Anguilla	2	0	2
Vanuatu	2	86	−84
Cayman Islands	2	223	−221
Turks and Caicos Islands	2	21	−19
Turkmenistan	1	1,400	−1,399
Algeria	1	69,920	−69,919
Bonaire, Sint Eustatius and Saba	1	38	−37
Timor-Leste	1	216	−215

== Observatory of Economic Complexity ==
Data is for 2023, in United States dollars.

List of countries by live animal exports (2023)
Country	Trade value
France	2,883,402,360
Canada	2,038,214,390
Netherlands	1,977,816,918
Denmark	1,916,718,865
Germany	1,561,026,465
China	1,225,373,534
United States	1,214,566,809
Mexico	1,174,986,493
Australia	1,081,044,072
Spain	914,370,699
Belgium	897,793,985
Ireland	881,895,209
Sudan	866,499,183
United Kingdom	760,991,750
Brazil	629,817,000
Hungary	619,643,062
Romania	550,278,182
Czech Republic	532,937,597
Somalia	494,518,975
Portugal	373,639,851
Iran	339,125,006
Colombia	261,465,324
Uruguay	252,920,114
Malaysia	248,089,847
Slovakia	241,632,474
Poland	208,231,530
Oman	198,986,154
Croatia	196,858,807
New Zealand	192,985,578
Austria	155,271,463
Vietnam	154,282,478
Bulgaria	148,685,845
Thailand	140,627,519
Jordan	128,380,839
Lithuania	126,352,105
Latvia	108,672,997
Slovenia	104,651,144
Mauritius	104,179,427
Namibia	103,518,629
United Arab Emirates	84,024,242
Russia	74,105,025
Italy	70,283,000
Egypt	69,923,645
Turkey	68,029,267
Georgia	66,318,736
Saudi Arabia	63,855,593
South Africa	62,366,713
Cambodia	60,872,745
Estonia	56,890,571
Serbia	55,183,703
Kyrgyzstan	54,030,569
Botswana	50,530,718
Ukraine	49,568,846
Luxembourg	47,309,908
Sweden	46,688,579
Djibouti	45,074,872
Qatar	36,075,054
Japan	35,614,596
Chile	35,348,247
Indonesia	29,765,146
Argentina	28,484,712
Uganda	26,590,184
Myanmar	25,143,521
Switzerland	24,677,424
Kenya	24,351,988
Kazakhstan	23,439,371
Israel	21,463,194
Greece	20,544,502
Morocco	19,552,471
Ethiopia	17,933,318
Costa Rica	14,856,002
Norway	13,736,777
Zambia	12,942,533
Iceland	12,734,727
Armenia	12,731,060
El Salvador	11,950,607
Mongolia	11,856,690
India	10,778,537
Tanzania	10,445,130
Moldova	8,824,434
Finland	8,787,476
Kuwait	7,902,680
Ghana	7,463,557
Guatemala	6,850,011
Togo	6,662,757
Taiwan	6,375,641
Burkina Faso	6,288,879
Uzbekistan	5,611,826
Peru	5,374,571
Cyprus	5,346,593
South Korea	4,782,360
Syria	4,706,339
Belize	4,354,463
North Macedonia	4,288,209
Niger	4,227,264
Nicaragua	4,024,185
Philippines	3,795,851
Pakistan	3,759,636
Hong Kong	2,940,231
Ecuador	2,801,996
Zimbabwe	2,531,751
Singapore	2,505,246
Eswatini	1,878,915
Lebanon	1,797,980
Belarus	1,572,574
Malawi	1,344,666
Tajikistan	1,317,204
Bahrain	1,295,045
Bosnia and Herzegovina	1,200,264
Seychelles	1,192,464
Iraq	1,120,114
Guyana	1,081,232
Paraguay	1,081,100
Saint Kitts and Nevis	1,062,209
Curacao	911,834
Cuba	892,647
Venezuela	884,991
Suriname	878,742
Sri Lanka	873,886
Malta	846,036
Azerbaijan	727,278
Tunisia	667,466
Rwanda	634,262
DR Congo	572,862
Nigeria	541,135
Panama	464,111
Laos	460,030
Barbados	354,422
Madagascar	353,578
Mali	353,139
Albania	304,746
Dominican Republic	273,388
Mozambique	200,374
Jamaica	195,927
Mauritania	195,370
Montenegro	191,129
Brunei	173,599
Lesotho	171,250
Honduras	164,948
Solomon Islands	162,454
Afghanistan	147,960
Congo	142,778
Cameroon	141,303
Andorra	138,399
Guinea	132,623
Benin	127,826
Senegal	103,155
Bermuda	82,857
Gibraltar	77,529
Macau	56,376
British Virgin Islands	54,574
Saint Martin	48,819
Fiji	40,705
Algeria	40,354
Saint Vincent and the Grenadines	37,008
Cote d'Ivoire	35,363
Cayman Islands	30,598
Saint Lucia	29,517
Central African Republic	22,672
Bolivia	20,069
Aruba	17,966
New Caledonia	16,500
Angola	15,639
Libya	12,026
Bahamas	11,911
American Samoa	9,476
Tonga	7,422
Maldives	4,760
Grenada	4,296
Haiti	4,014
Sierra Leone	3,460
Gabon	1,988
Guinea-Bissau	1,828
Turks and Caicos Islands	1,539
Trinidad and Tobago	1,498
Bangladesh	1,452
Tokelau	1,375
Antigua and Barbuda	1,250
Nepal	898
Burundi	876
Bonaire	803
South Sudan	700
Chad	498
Papua New Guinea	371
Bhutan	225
Anguilla	55
North Korea	33
French Polynesia	29
Vanuatu	5
Wallis and Futuna	5
Gambia	0
