= List of countries by rate of fatal workplace accidents =

This is a list of countries by rate of workplace fatalities per 100,000 workers. According to estimates, around 2.3 million people die yearly from work-related accidents or diseases every year.

== List of countries ==
Countries by fatal workplace accidents per 100,000 workers (2014–2024)
Country	Total	Men	Women	Year
Malaysia	14.6	21.1	3.9	2022
Burundi	13.8	5.4	0.4	2021
Turkey	11.5	17.0	0.9	2024
Egypt	11.2	13.8	2.5	2014
Costa Rica	9.7	–	–	2016
France	8.2	10.6	1.7	2024
Mexico	7.7	10.6	3.0	2021
Ukraine	7.6	10.8	4.8	2021
New Caledonia	7.0	–	–	2015
Macao	6.9	11.9	1.6	2016
Guadeloupe	6.8	–	–	2014
Thailand	6.8	–	–	2014
Hong Kong	6.0	–	–	2015
Zimbabwe	6.0	5.8	0.2	2022
Belize	5.2	8.9	0.0	2022
Russia	5.0	8.1	0.8	2024
Mongolia	4.4	7.3	1.0	2023
Kazakhstan	4.3	3.4	0.9	2017
Moldova	4.3	8.7	0.3	2024
Armenia	4.2	6.5	0.0	2020
Kyrgyzstan	4.1	8.0	0.7	2015
Colombia	4.0	–	–	2015
Azerbaijan	4.0	6.0	1.0	2023
South Korea	3.9	–	–	2023
Cyprus	3.8	8.5	–	2020
Uruguay	3.7	–	–	2018
United States	3.7	6.0	0.7	2022
Mauritius	3.7	5.9	0.4	2024
Uzbekistan	3.6	3.4	0.1	2024
Bulgaria	3.5	6.9	0.2	2023
Latvia	3.5	7.3	0.0	2023
Philippines	3.2	–	–	2021
Chile	3.1	4.6	0.5	2018
Myanmar	3.1	8.6	0.0	2019
Qatar	3.0	3.5	–	2022
Argentina	3.0	5.0	0.2	2024
Portugal	2.9	5.5	0.2	2022
Czech Republic	2.7	5.2	0.1	2015
Croatia	2.7	4.7	0.4	2016
Georgia	2.4	4.3	0.0	2024
Lithuania	2.4	4.5	0.1	2024
Romania	2.4	2.2	0.2	2024
Réunion	2.3	–	–	2014
Belarus	2.3	4.8	0.1	2024
Slovenia	2.2	3.8	0.2	2023
Canada	2.0	3.5	0.3	2014
Singapore	1.9	–	–	2015
Austria	1.8	3.2	0.1	2024
Spain	1.7	3.1	0.2	2023
Israel	1.6	3.4	–	2023
Hungary	1.6	1.5	0.1	2024
Switzerland	1.4	–	–	2015
Australia	1.4	2.6	0.1	2023
Estonia	1.4	2.5	0.3	2023
Iceland	1.4	1.4	0.0	2023
Malta	1.3	2.1	0.0	2024
Poland	1.2	2.1	0.1	2023
Norway	1.1	2.1	–	2022
Slovakia	1.1	2.0	0.3	2024
Palestine	1.0	–	1.0	2020
Ecuador	1.0	–	1.0	2023
Finland	1.0	1.9	0.1	2023
Greece	0.9	1.5	0.1	2016
Luxembourg	0.8	1.3	0.0	2024
Germany	0.7	1.2	0.1	2022
Sweden	0.7	1.4	0.0	2024
Bahrain	0.6	0.7	0.0	2020
Sri Lanka	0.5	0.7	0.0	2024
Panama	0.3	0.3	–	2024
Guatemala	0.1	0.2	0.0	2022
Belgium	0.1	0.2	0.0	2023
French Guiana	0.0	–	–	2014
