= List of countries by number of medical doctors =

A medical doctor, medical practitioner, physician, or simply doctor, is a health professional who practices medicine, which is concerned with promoting, maintaining or restoring health through the study, diagnosis, prognosis and treatment of disease, injury, and other physical and mental impairments.

== List ==
List of countries by doctors per 10,000 people
Country	Doctors per^{10,000 people}	Year
Afghanistan	2.535	2020
Albania	18.826	2020
Algeria	9.868	2019
Andorra	36.262	2015
Angola	2.443	2022
Anguilla	15.132	2018
Antigua and Barbuda	28.979	2017
Argentina	40.818	2022
Armenia	31.174	2019
Australia	39.812	2021
Austria	55.083	2022
Azerbaijan	30.933	2020
Bahamas	18.546	2017
Bahrain	8.420	2016
Bangladesh	6.700	2021
Barbados	29.652	2022
Belarus	44.696	2020
Belgium	63.932	2022
Belize	10.809	2018
Benin	1.953	2022
Bhutan	5.521	2022
Bolivia	12.688	2021
Bosnia and Herzegovina	23.183	2019
Botswana	3.775	2022
Brazil	21.420	2021
Brunei	19.129	2021
Bulgaria	48.962	2022
Burkina Faso	1.466	2022
Burundi	0.647	2021
Côte d'Ivoire	1.751	2022
Cape Verde	44.579	2022
Cambodia	2.143	2019
Cameroon	1.347	2022
Canada	24.970	2022
Central African Republic	0.209	2021
Chad	0.850	2022
Chile	31.700	2022
China	25.183	2021
Colombia	24.512	2021
Comoros	4.391	2020
Congo	1.745	2022
Cook Islands	13.450	2019
Costa Rica	26.359	2022
Croatia	36.098	2021
Cuba	94.285	2021
Cyprus	35.517	2021
Czech Republic	42.539	2021
Denmark	43.810	2020
Djibouti	2.032	2014
Dominica	11.158	2018
Dominican Republic	22.347	2022
Democratic Republic of the Congo	1.868	2022
Ecuador	23.075	2020
Egypt	6.827	2020
El Salvador	15.518	2022
Equatorial Guinea	1.427	2022
Eritrea	0.706	2022
Estonia	34.379	2021
Eswatini	15.911	2022
Ethiopia	1.080	2022
Fiji	8.144	2015
Finland	43.808	2021
France	33.429	2021
Gabon	4.768	2022
Gambia	1.019	2021
Georgia	56.129	2022
Germany	45.181	2021
Ghana	1.412	2022
Greece	63.668	2021
Grenada	13.136	2018
Guatemala	12.802	2020
Guinea	0.214	2022
Guinea-Bissau	2.080	2022
Guyana	14.049	2020
Haiti	2.366	2018
Honduras	4.893	2020
Hungary	32.983	2021
Iceland	45.240	2022
India	7.265	2020
Indonesia	6.896	2022
Iran	15.138	2018
Iraq	10.122	2022
Ireland	40.622	2021
Israel	37.129	2022
Italy	42.484	2022
Jamaica	5.498	2018
Japan	26.141	2020
Jordan	25.129	2019
Kazakhstan	40.277	2020
Kenya	1.021	2022
Kiribati	1.942	2013
Kuwait	22.934	2020
Kyrgyzstan	21.453	2021
Laos	3.265	2021
Latvia	33.769	2021
Lebanon	26.170	2019
Lesotho	1.505	2022
Liberia	1.799	2022
Libya	21.568	2017
Lithuania	51.274	2022
Luxembourg	29.851	2017
Madagascar	1.765	2014
Malawi	0.488	2021
Malaysia	23.159	2021
Maldives	21.606	2019
Mali	1.948	2022
Malta	42.757	2021
Marshall Islands	4.598	2012
Mauritania	2.361	2022
Mauritius	11.966	2022
Mexico	25.594	2021
Micronesia	9.634	2020
Moldova	32.461	2021
Monaco	88.889	2020
Mongolia	38.742	2021
Montenegro	27.524	2022
Morocco	7.319	2017
Mozambique	0.816	2022
Myanmar	7.509	2019
Namibia	5.430	2022
Nauru	12.500	2015
Nepal	8.674	2021
Netherlands	39.061	2021
New Zealand	35.738	2022
Nicaragua	6.637	2018
Niger	0.234	2022
Nigeria	3.943	2022
Niue	16.667	2008
North Korea	36.709	2017
North Macedonia	29.643	2020
Norway	51.684	2021
Oman	20.584	2022
Pakistan	10.842	2019
Palau	17.778	2020
Palestine	21.677	2018
Panama	17.340	2021
Papua New Guinea	0.629	2021
Paraguay	38.816	2022
Peru	16.209	2022
Philippines	7.862	2021
Poland	33.908	2021
Portugal	57.665	2021
Qatar	24.986	2018
Romania	34.713	2021
Russia	38.271	2020
Rwanda	1.162	2019
Saint Kitts and Nevis	30.335	2018
Saint Lucia	6.546	2017
Saint Vincent and the Grenadines	9.436	2012
South Korea	25.174	2021
Samoa	5.484	2021
San Marino	60.180	2014
São Tomé and Príncipe	4.893	2019
Saudi Arabia	30.768	2022
Senegal	1.264	2022
Serbia	28.373	2021
Seychelles	38.189	2022
Sierra Leone	0.425	2022
Singapore	25.960	2021
Slovakia	36.800	2021
Slovenia	33.259	2021
Solomon Islands	1.911	2016
Somalia	0.232	2014
South Africa	8.085	2021
South Sudan	0.430	2020
Spain	44.799	2021
Sri Lanka	11.924	2021
Sudan	2.626	2017
Suriname	14.780	2021
Sweden	71.516	2021
Switzerland	44.427	2021
Syria	11.856	2016
Tajikistan	21.330	2021
Tanzania	1.327	2022
Thailand	9.276	2020
Timor-Leste	7.669	2020
Togo	0.825	2022
Tokelau	16.667	2021
Tonga	10.094	2021
Trinidad and Tobago	41.934	2020
Tunisia	12.916	2021
Turkmenistan	21.435	2021
Tuvalu	12.613	2020
Turkey	21.654	2021
Uganda	1.681	2022
Ukraine	29.898	2014
United Arab Emirates	29.117	2021
United Kingdom	31.742	2022
United States	36.082	2021
Uruguay	46.295	2022
Uzbekistan	28.047	2021
Vanuatu	1.577	2019
Venezuela	16.643	2017
Vietnam	8.326	2016
Yemen	2.936	2014
Zambia	2.619	2022
Zimbabwe	1.659	2022

== Historical data ==
Country	2000–2009		2007–2013	2020–2023
Country	Size	Doctors per^{10,000 people}	Doctors per^{10,000 people}	Doctors per^{10,000 people}
Australia	19612	10	32.7	41.02
Austria	31175	38	48.3	54.6
Azerbaijan	32388	38	34.0	
Albania	3626	11	11.5	18.83
Algeria	40857	12	12.1	17.2
Angola	1165	1	1.7	
Andorra	249	37	40.0	
Argentina	122623	32	38.6	38.95
Armenia	11090	37	27.0	
Afghanistan	5970	2	2.7	2.54
(The Bahamas) Bahamas	997	28.2	28.2	
Bangladesh	42881	3	3.6	6.7
Bahrain	2227	30	9.2	
Belarus	46965	49	39.3	
Belize	251	11	8.3	
Belgium	44124	42	29.9	62.57
Benin	542	1	0.6	
Bulgaria	27911	37	38.7	
Bolivia	10329	12	4.7	
Bosnia and Herzegovina	5540	14	19.3	
Botswana	715	4	4	
Brazil	320013	17	18.9	21.6
Brunei	400	11	14.4	19.13
Burkina Faso	921	1	0.5	
Burundi	200	0.5	8.55	0.65
Bhutan	52	0.5	2.6	5.6
North Macedonia	5187	25	26.2	
Vanuatu	30	1	1.2	
Hungary	27957	28	30.8	32.91
Venezuela	48000	19	19	16.64
Vietnam	44960	6	11.9	
Gabon	395	3	3	5.94
Guyana	366	5	2.1	14.05
Gambia	62	0.5	1.1	0.77
Ghana	2587	1	1	1.64
Guatemala	13367	9.3	9.3	12.8
Guinea	940	1	1	
Guinea-Bissau	78	0.5	0.7	2.2
Germany	288182	35	38.9	42.5
Honduras	3676	6	6	4.89
Greece	59599	54	54	63.06
Georgia	19951	45	42.7	71.2
Denmark	17226	32	34.9	
Democratic Republic of the Congo	5827	1	1	
Djibouti	140	2	2	
Dominican Republic	15670	19	14.9	
Egypt	179900	24	28.3	4.5
Zambia	649	1	1.7	2.97
Zimbabwe	2086	2	0.8	1.89
Israel	25314	36	33.4	36.54
India	643520	6	7	8.6
Indonesia	204000			4.3
Jordan	15279	26	25.6	
Iraq	15994	5	6.1	7.1
Iran	61870	9	9	15.8
Ireland	13141	31	26.7	40.62
Iceland	1120	38	34.8	
Spain	163800	38	49.5	45.77
Italy	215000	37	37.6	41.62
Yemen	6739	3	2	
Cape Verde	310	6	3.1	
Kazakhstan	57387	39	36.2	40.28
Cambodia	2047	2	1.7	
Cameroon	3124	2	0.8	1.24
Canada	62307	19	20.7	26.1
Qatar	2313	28	77.4	24.9
Kenya	4506	1	2	2.26
Cyprus	1950	23	23.3	53.75
Kiribati	20	2	3.8	
China	1862630	14	14.9	19.8
Colombia	58761	14	14.7	23.62
Comoros	115	2	2	
Republic of the Congo	401	1	1	
North Korea	74597	33	33	
Costa Rica	5204	13	11.1	27.7
Ivory Coast	2746	1	1.4	
Cuba	72416	64	67.2	84.2
Kuwait	4840	18	17.9	22.93
Kyrgyzstan	12395	23	19.7	
Laos	2000	3	1.8	3.27
Latvia	6940	30	35.8	33.45
Lesotho	89	1	1	
Liberia	51	0.5	0.1	
Lebanon	11760	33	32	
Libya	7070	12	19	
Lithuania	13729	40	41.2	49.5
Luxembourg	1326	29	29	30.1
Mauritius	1303	11	11	26.58
Mauritania	445	1	1.3	
Madagascar	3150	2	1.6	
Malawi	257	0.5	0.2	0.49
Malaysia	17020	7	12	22.28
Mali	1060	1	0.8	
Maldives	302	9	14.2	
Malta	1357	34	34.9	54.85
Morocco	18269	6	6.2	7.3
Marshall Islands	24	5	4.4	
Mexico	303519	29	21	23.8
Federated States of Micronesia	60	6	1.8	9.63
Mozambique	548	0.5	0.4	0.81
Monaco	270	71.7	71.7	
Mongolia	6732	26	28.4	
Myanmar	17791	4	6.1	
Namibia	598	3	3.7	
Nauru	10	8	7.1	
Nepal	5384	2	2	8.67
Niger	288	0.5	0.2	0.34
Nigeria	55376	4	4.1	3.8
Netherlands	64417	39	39	38.36
Nicaragua	2045	4	9	
Niue	4	20	30	
New Zealand	8190	21	27.4	35.16
Norway	18143	39	42.8	51.68
Tanzania	300	0.5	0.3	
United Arab Emirates	6946	15	25.3	28.79
Oman	4908	18	24.3	19.94
Cook Islands	20	12	12	
Pakistan	127859	8	8.3	9.8
Palau	30	16	13.8	17.78
Panama	4431	15	16.5	16.29
Papua New Guinea	275	1	0.6	0.63
Paraguay	6355	11	12.3	32.42
Peru	34437	11.3	11.3	16.46
Poland	77479	20	22.2	37.17
Portugal	36138	34	41	41.4
South Korea	81998	17	21.4	25.08
Moldova	11167	27	29.8	40.57
Russia	614183	43	43	40.1
Rwanda	221	0.5	0.6	
Romania	41455	19	24.5	
El Salvador	7938	12	16	29.13
Samoa	50	3	4.5	5.54
San Marino	163	51.0	51	
São Tomé and Príncipe	81	5	5	
Saudi Arabia	41870	16	24.9	27.6
Eswatini	171	2	1.7	1.4
Seychelles	121	15	10.7	
Senegal	741	1	0.6	0.84
Saint Vincent and the Grenadines	89	8	8	
Saint Kitts and Nevis	46	11	11	
Saint Lucia	18	1.1	1.1	
Serbia	20013	20	21.1	
Singapore	6380	15	19.5	
Syria	10342	5	14.6	
Slovakia	16868	31	33.2	46.29
Slovenia	4766	24	25.2	32.79
United Kingdom	126126	21	28.1	31.71
United States	793648	27	24.5	26.1
Solomon Islands	60	1	2.2	
Somalia	300	0.5	0.5	
Sudan	11083	3	2.8	
Suriname	191	5	5	
Sierra Leone	95	0.5	0.2	0.7
Tajikistan	13267	20	19.2	
Thailand	18987	3	3.9	9.28
Timor-Leste	79	1	0.7	7.67
Togo	349	1	0.5	0.59
Tonga	30	3	5.6	10.09
Trinidad and Tobago	1543	12	11.8	34.12
Tuvalu	10	9	10.9	12.61
Tunisia	13330	13	12.2	
Turkmenistan	12104	24	24	
Turkey	110482	15	17.1	18.5
Uganda	3361	1	1	1.58
Uzbekistan	71627	26	25.3	
Ukraine	143728	31	35.4	
Uruguay	12384	37	37.4	62
Fiji	380	5	4.3	
Philippines	90370	12	12	7.83
Finland	17503	33	29.1	43.25
France	227683	37	31.9	32.7
Croatia	11799	26	28.4	
Central African Republic	331	1	0.5	0.7
Chad	345	0.5	0.5	0.4
Montenegro	1233	20	21.1	27.68
Czech Republic	36815	36	36.2	54.69
Chile	17250	11	17.8	29.73
Switzerland	28812	40	40.5	43
Sweden	32495	36	39.3	70.62
Sri Lanka	10479	6	6.8	11.92
Ecuador	18335	15	17.2	
Equatorial Guinea	153	3	3	
Eritrea	215	1	1	0.82
Estonia	4414	33	32.4	38.63
Ethiopia	1806	0.5	0.3	1.04
South Africa	34829	8	7.8	8.09
Jamaica	2253	9	4.1	
Japan	270371	21	23	24.1
