= International rankings of Iran =

The following are international rankings for Iran:

== Agriculture ==
Rankings
Name	Rank	Out of	Source	Notes	Year
Number of agricultural machinery: tractors	22	190	World Bank	258,000 tractors in operation	2003
Irrigated land per capita	14	173	CIA World Factbook	~1,153 km^{2} per 1 million people	2003
Total agricultural land	15	199	World Bank	616,000 km^{2} of agricultural land	2005
Total agricultural land per capita	57	199	World Bank	~9 km^{2} of agricultural land per 1,000 people	2005
Area of permanent crops	18	181	Food and Agriculture Organization	2,002,000 hectares of permanent crops, (29.4334 hectares per 1,000 people; Per capita ranking: 69/181)	2000
Arable land as % of total land area	109	199	World Bank	9.84% of land area is arable (16,100,000 hectares)	2005
Permanent cropland area as % of total land area	110	187	World Bank	0.92% of country's landmass is used as permanent cropland	2005
Index of agricultural production	13	149	United Nations	Index based on agricultural output for 1989-91 taken as 100; Index of Iran: 141	1996-98
Annual diesel consumption in agriculture	7	107	United Nations	Annual diesel consumption in agriculture of 3,341,000 tonnes	2005
Agricultural electricity consumption per capita	18	110	United Nations	241.3 kWh per capita/Year	2005
Cereal production	13	149	World Resources Institute	141,000 tonnes of cereal produced annually	2001
Meat production per capita	73	149	United Nations	~21.1 kg/person annually	1998

== Communication and information technology ==
Rankings
Name	Rank	Out of	Source	Notes	Year
E-readiness	68	70	Economist Intelligence Unit		2009
Number of Internet Users	15	195	Internet World Stats	70.0% of population use internet	2017
Total number of broadband internet users	44	48	International Telecommunication Union	300,000 broadband internet users or ~0.41% of population; more info: Internet in Iran	2008
ICT Development Index	72	173	International Telecommunication Union		2024
Telephone Lines in Use	10	100	CIA World Factbook	30,818,011 Telephone lines in use; 80% of telephony system had become digitized by 2004 94.8% of homes had telephone lines in 2010	2016
Mobile Phones in Use	22	56	United Nations	74,219,000 Mobile phone users	2016
Investment in telecommunication infrastructure as % of total revenue	10	190	World Bank	73.68% of total revenue in telecommunication sector was reinvested for expansion of telecommunication & Cyberinfrastructure	2005
E-government Readiness	102	193	United Nations	Measure of a country's e-Government capabilities	2010
E-participation of Public	117	193	United Nations	Measure of a nation's population participation in e-Government	2010
Number of daily newspapers & periodicals	14	124	United Nations	112 daily newspapers & periodicals present. See also: Media of Iran.	2000
Number of non-daily newspapers & periodicals	8	91	United Nations	906 non-daily newspapers & periodicals present	2000
Number of Television Broadcast Stations	67	228	CIA World Factbook	In 1997 there were 28 TV broadcast stations plus 450 repeaters in Iran. By 2010, there were 74 high power broadcast stations, 430 medium power and 5,000 low power broadcast stations in addition to 120 TV studios, 47 TV channels & 50 radio channels. Iran switched from SECAM to PAL in 1998. By 2015 Iran planned to complete its switchover to digital TV. More info: Countries by color TV introduction & Countries by TV introduction.	1997
Number of Internet Service Providers (ISP)	9	165	CIA World Factbook	100 ISPs in operation	2002
List of countries by number of Internet hosts	120	190	CIA World Factbook	There are 2,860 Internet hosts in Iran.	2008
Number of websites on national domain	58	World	Webometrics	Iran has 310,000 websites on its national domain (dotIR); Iran ranks 32nd globally in terms of total number of websites	2009
Internet Speed	174	181	Speedtest.net	Hamadan is the province of Iran with the fastest upload/download speed at 0.32/1.09 Mbps and I.P.M. is the fastest ISP in Iran with 0.76/2.87.	2010
Google Transparency Report		World	Google	Iran censors internet traffic.	2010

== Demographics ==
Rankings
Name	Rank	Out of	Source	Notes	Year
Birth Rate	96	195	United Nations	20.3 Births per 1000 population/Year	2005-10
Death Rate	183	195	United Nations	5.3 Deaths per 1000 population/year. Top ten causes of death in Iran: 1. Ischaemic heart disease, 2. Road traffic accident, 3. Stroke, 4. Perinatal conditions, 5. Hypertension, 6. Stomach cancer, 7. COPD, 8. Diarrhea, 9. Inflammatory heart disease, 10. Lower respiratory tract infection. More info: List of most important causes of death for humans.	2005-10
Nations with least divorce rate	25	World	United Nations	Crude divorce rate of 0.94 per 1,000 population; By 2009 Iran's divorce rate had reached 1.7 per 1,000 people	2004
Cities Proper by Population	17	61	United Nations	City proper of Tehran; population: 7,873,000; Area: 760 km^{2}; Population density: 10,359 Persons/km^{2}	2007
Urban agglomerations by Population	28	100	United Nations	Tehran population agglomerate with a population of 7,873,000	2007
Urbanization by country	65	193	CIA World Factbook	74.4% of population is urban; 982 cities & 68,122 villages	2005-10
Urbanization Rate	82	193	CIA World Factbook	Urbanization rate of 1.78%	2005-10
List of countries by infant mortality rate	119	195	United Nations	Infant mortality rate of 30.6 & Under-5 mortality rate of 35.5 /1000 live births	2006
Maternal mortality rate	92	136	United Nations	37/100,000 Pregnancies; By 2008 Iran's MMR became 27.8/100,000 Pregnancies	1985-99
Population	17	223	United Nations	Population of 74,196,000 or approximately 1.09% of the world's population. More info: Past and future population by country.	2009
Life Expectancy	129	World	CIA World Factbook	Overall life expectancy of 74 years; Male: 72.7 years; Female: 75.5 years	2017
Population Growth Rate	96	230	United Nations	Population growth rate of 1.35%	2005-10
Population Density	160	239	United Nations	Population density of 45.017 persons/km^{2}	2005
Net Migration Rate	126	154	CIA World Factbook	Migrants/1000 population: -2.62	2009
Fertility Rate	129	223	United Nations	Total fertility rate of 2.04 births/woman; Iran has reduced its fertility rate of 6.6 births/woman in 1970 to the replacement level of 2 in 2005 in a revolutionary female health program & successfully stopping Iran's first baby-boom; This reduction of fertility rate is one of the fastest in history of mankind Total fertility rate declined from 7 births/woman in 1979 to 1.9 births/woman in 2006	2005-10
Adolescent fertility rate: Births/1000 females aged 15-19 years	139	185	World Bank	19.14 births/1000 females aged 15–19; ranked from highest rates to lowest; more info: UNICEF statistics	2005
Immigrant population	21	192	United Nations	Immigrants in Iran: 1.05% of total world immigrant population or 1,959,000; 2.861% of Iran's national population	2005
Foreign refugees population	1	110	United Nations	Host to the world's largest and longest staying foreign refugees population, mostly Iraqi and Afghan refugees. More info: Afghan Refugees in Iran. As of 2010 there were more than 3 million Afghan refugees living in Iran, and in the prior three decades Iran was host to an average refugee population of over 5 million.	1999
Median age	122	230	CIA World Factbook	Total median age: 30.3; male median age: 30; female median age: 30.5.	2017

== Economy ==
Rankings
Name	Rank	Out of	Source	Notes	Year
GDP (PPP)	18	193	World Bank	GDP (PPP)= $1.352 trillion.	2016
GDP (PPP) per capita	67	187	International Monetary Fund	GDP (PPP) per capita= $18,077.	2016
GDP (nominal)	27	182	World Bank	GDP (nominal)= $393.4 billion.	2016
GDP (nominal) per capita	96	187	International Monetary Fund	GDP (nominal) per capita= $4,683.	2016
GDP (PPP) per person employed	36	87	CIA World Factbook	US $39,696 per person employed; 33% of the total population is employed	2009
GNI per capita (PPP)	57	World	World Bank	Average national income (PPP) of $11,490 per person/year	2009
GNI per capita (nominal)	89	World	World Bank	GNI (nominal) per capita=US $6,550.	2015
GDP growth rate	68	182	International Monetary Fund	GDP growth of 20.6% (Not adjusted)	2009
GDP (real) growth rate	18	217	International Monetary Fund	Adjusted GDP (real) growth rate of 6.54%; See also: 1990-2007 annualized GDP growth rate	2016
Real GDP per capita growth rate	99	174	World Bank	Iran's real GDP per capita growth rate=3.1%	2006
World's largest consumer markets	35	World	United Nations	Size of Iran's consumer market in 2013 = $190.776 billion	2013
Starting a Business Index	48	World	World Bank	The index measures the ease of starting up a new business	2010
Ease of Doing Business Index	124	190	World Bank	The survey was done indirectly &/or by estimation	2018
Business freedom index	77	World	Freedom Meta-Index	Index measuring freedom for private businesses	2011
Prime lending rate	76	153	CIA World Factbook	Prime lending rate of 12%	2007
Human Development Index	60	189	United Nations / UN Human Development Report 2017	Human development index of 0.798; Categorized among High-HDI countries; Iran ranks 3rd worldwide in terms of progress in its Human Development Index for the past three decades	2017
Human Poverty Index	59	135	United Nations / Complete Report	HPI is a composite index measuring deprivations in the three basic dimensions: a long & healthy life, knowledge and a decent standard of living; Calculated using HPI-1 formula; Ranked from least poverty index to maximum poverty index; More info: HDR for Iran	2009
National wealth per capita	88	World	World Bank	Iran's per capita national wealth=US $38,000	2000
Income equality	72	World	United Nations	Iran had a Gini coefficient of 38.8.	2014
Least Inflation Rates	83	World	IMF	Inflation rate of ~8% More info: Iranian online consumer price monitor	2010
Government Budget	32	188	CIA World Factbook	Government revenue of $97.7 billion in 2009; 2010-2011 Total Government Budget of $347 billion More info: Government of Iran	2009
Highest government budget surplus	4	World	CIA World Factbook	Government budget surplus of 3.9 billion US dollars	2009
List of countries by received FDI	60	World	CIA World Factbook	$44.640 billion of Foreign Direct Investment in Iran by foreign entities.	2015
List of countries by FDI abroad	65	World	CIA World Factbook	993 million dollars invested by Iranian entities outside of Iran	2008
Size of Sovereign Wealth Funds	20	36	Sovereign Wealth Funds Institute	Sovereign wealth fund of 23 billion dollars in oil stabilization fund (OSF); see also: National Development Fund	2009
Investment as % of GDP	36	145	CIA World Factbook	Share of gross fixed investment as % of GDP: 27.7%	2008
Exports per capita	73	157	CIA World Factbook	$1,211 of exports per capita/year	2014
Tax revenue as % of GDP	163	World	The Heritage Foundation	Government tax revenue as % of GDP=7.3%. More info: Taxation in Iran	2008
Current account balance	4	191	International Monetary Fund	Annual account balance of +70.797 billion dollars in surplus	2010
current account balance as % of GDP	38	World	International Monetary Fund	Current account balance as % of GDP= +4.05%; Iran has the world's 38th largest trade surplus as % of GDP	2008
General government final consumption expenditure	38	145	World Bank	General government final consumption is the total government expenditure excluding capital investments; Iran: 15,826,440,000 constant 2000 US$	2005
Gold reserve of government	8	World	International Monetary Fund	907 tonnes of Gold reserves; More info: Gold reserves of Iran, Iranian Crown Jewels	2012
Foreign exchange reserves	20	World	World Bank	$120 billion of forex reserves, More info: Central Bank of Iran	2012
List of countries by imports	44	222	CIA World Factbook	Annual import bill of $76.39 billion	2017
List of countries by exports	37	222	CIA World Factbook	Total annual exports of $101,4 billion	2017
Unemployment rate	75	World	United Nations	Unemployment rate of 11.3%; Ranked from highest unemployment rate to lowest.	2009
Difficulty of hiring index	10	154	Doing Business & World Bank	Measures the difficulty to hire workers; Index of Iran: 78	2004
Difficulty of firing index	118	154	Doing Business & World Bank	Measures the difficulty to fire workers; Index of Iran: 10	2004
Primary exports as % of manufactured exports	9	117	World Bank	Primary export is 93% of total manufactured exports, mostly oil	2000
Compensation of employees as % of total business expenses	14	135	World Bank	47.14% of business expense is employee compensation	2005
GDP sector composition	35	197	CIA World Factbook	Agriculture=11.2%; Industry= 41.7%; Service= 47.1%; Share of oil related activity in total GDP is less than 10%	2005
Real Growth in Total Trade	73	World	World Bank	The average annual growth rate of the total exports and imports in goods and services at constant 2000 U.S. dollars; This indicator reflects the trade expansion of a country over the period	2008
Public debt as % of GDP	114	World	CIA World Factbook	Total public debt stands at 16.2% of GDP; Ranked from highest total government debt to lowest.	2010
Total external debt	122	World	CIA World Factbook	Ranked from the highest debt to lowest; Total external debt of 7.995 billion dollars; Or 1.85% of GDP; Or $96 per person; 4th least indebted country in the world by external debt to GDP ratio	2017
Total Debt Service	33	135	World Bank	Approximately $2.52 billion paid/year to foreign creditors in interest and principal repayment	2005
$ external debt as /$1000 of GDP	174	186	CIA World Factbook	$61.60/$1000 of GDP	2006
Labour force	22	185	CIA World Factbook	Total labour force of 24.35 million people, more info: Labor and tax laws in Iran	2008
% of Industry in total Labour force	15	139	World Bank	30.4% of labour force work in industry	2005
% of Agriculture in total labour force	47	139	World Bank	24.9% of labour force work in agriculture	2005
% of female employment in industry	5	130	World Bank	28.4% of all industrial labour force is female	2005
% of female employment in agriculture	29	130	World Bank	34.2% of all agricultural labour force is female	2005
Economic activity growth of females	6	156	International Labour Organization	34% growth of female participation in economic activities	1990–2000
Retirement pension as % of GDP	56	58	United Nations/IMF	Iran spends 1.1% of its GDP on national pensions; 5% of Iran's population is 65 yrs old & above; In 2009 for every retiree there were fifteen active workers & by 2050 this ratio is going to fall to three workers per retiree	2009
Index of Economic Freedom	171	179	2008 The Heritage Foundation's Index of Economic Freedom		2011
World's highest central bank interest rates	75	World	CIA World Factbook	Annualized interest rate set by the central bank to charge commercial banks for short-term loans; More info: Banking and Insurance in Iran	2011
World's highest commercial bank interest rates	76	World	CIA World Factbook	Averaged annualized interest rate charged by the commercial banks on new loans to their most trustworthy customers; More info: Bank Melli Iran	2007
Gross savings as % of Gross National Income	6	172	World Bank	Gross savings of 41.57% of GNI	2005
Highest Marginal Tax Rate on High Income	6	109	World Bank	6th highest marginal tax rate for individual income exceeding $114,101.4; More info: Labour and tax laws in Iran	2006
Taxes on income, profits and capital gains as % of total taxes	11	137	World Bank	Ratio: 58.84%	2005
Number of micro, small & medium enterprises	21	115	World Bank	1,255,382 Enterprises	1997
Number of micro, small & medium enterprises/1000 people	68	113	World Bank	20.62 Enterprises/1000 people	1997
International aid received as % of national GDP	120	129	OECD	International aid received is less than 0.1% of GDP; ~$100 million; The only international aid received is as part of international fight against drug trafficking and Illegal drug trade, chiefly opiates smuggling	2002
Largest Islamic Banking Sector	1	World	The Banker	Iran has the world's largest Islamic banking sector valued at 235.5 billion US dollars	2009
Least valued currency units	4	World	International Monetary Fund	Iranian rial is the world's 4th least valued currency unit; More info: Iranian rial	2009
World's largest black markets	19	World	Havocscope Black Markets Database	Size of Iran's black market is over US$10.64 billion; Largest black markets in Iran are that of alcohol smuggling ($912.5 million), Drug smuggling ($8.5 billion), Petroleum smuggling ($1.3 billion), Cigarette smuggling, Arms trafficking, Corruption, unlicensed movies and unlicensed software copies. More info: Smuggling in Iran	2009
Freedom from taxes index	69	World	Freedom Meta-Index	Index measuring tax free status of different countries	2011
Entrepreneurship	67	177	Global Entrepreneurship and Development Index	See also: Venture capital in Iran and Technology start-ups in Iran	2012

== Education ==
Rankings
Name	Rank	Out of	Source	Notes	Year
Adult literacy rate	47	World	United Nations	91% of adult population (age 15 & above) is literate; Total illiteracy rate of 6.2% of population in 2002 improving from 52.5% in 1976 Total literacy rate (age 6 & above): 92.7% in 2002; More info: Functional illiteracy & Aliteracy, Scientific literacy & School leaving age	2011
Education Index	74	176	United Nations	Iran's educational index= 0.683; More info: Technological literacy & Scientific literacy & Information literacy & Cognitive science	2015
Book titles published per year	9	World	Book titles published per country per year	72,871 Book titles published annually; More info: Iran Book News Agency	2014
Number of book titles published in applied sciences	16	99	United Nations	2,426 Book titles in applied sciences published	1999
Number of book titles published in arts & recreation	18	93	United Nations	733 Book titles in arts & recreation published	1999
Number of book titles published in psychology & philosophy	13	83	United Nations	706 Book titles in psychology & philosophy published	1999
Number of book titles published in theology	2	96	United Nations	4,504 Book titles in theology published	1999
Number of book titles published in literature	54	98	United Nations	247 Book titles in literature published	1999
Number of book titles published in generalities	12	88	United Nations	612 Book titles in generalities published	1999
Number of book titles published in philology	3	91	United Nations	1,486 Book titles in linguistics published	1999
Number of book titles published in pure sciences	7	94	United Nations	1,844 Book titles in pure sciences published	1999
Number of book titles published in social sciences	30	99	United Nations	1,319 Book titles in social sciences published	1999
Number of Library Books Per capita	72	81	United Nations	~6 library books per 1,000 people	2004
Literacy rate of men aged 15-24	54	155	United Nations	98.1% of male population 15-24 yrs old are literate	2005
Female to Male ratio of Primary School enrollment	1	197	United Nations	1.223 females per one male student	2005
Number of Secondary education students	8	185	World Bank	9,942,201 students in secondary schools	2005
Female/Male ratio of literacy rate in 15-24yrs old population	87	155	United Nations	Female/male ratio of literate 15–24 years old population: 0.99. Total female literacy rate of 76.2% in 2002, improving from 25.5% in 1976.	2005
Number of pupils in primary education	17	193	World Bank	7,307,056 students in primary level schools	2005
Education enrollment at tertiary level	22	200	United Nations	1,714,433 students at tertiary level of education; 64% of university students are female	2002
Education enrollment at tertiary level per capita	68	188	United Nations	26.159 tertiary level students per 1,000 people	2002
Education spending as % of GDP	58	132	United Nations	4.9% of GDP is spent on education	2003
Education budget as % of total government budget	19	161	World Bank	Education budget is 22.85% of total government budget	2005
Total school life expectancy	58	110	United Nations	Citizens on average attend 11.3 years of schooling	1999
Illiteracy rate among population over 15 years old	52	138	United Nations	20.9% of population over 15 years old are illiterate	2003
School Success Index Rank	29	158	Save the Children: State of the World's Mothers report 2009	The index is a calculated composite measure of indicators for early childhood growth & development, Under-5 survival rate, nutrition, adult female literacy rate, total fertility rate, grade 1 repetition rate, % of children out of school & children proficiency at mathematics, reading & fine motor skills; Ranking is among 43 developed & 115 developing countries, totaling 158; More info: Study skills	2009
Country Rank by World's Top Universities	55	World	Webometrics	Iran has one university among the list of world's top 1000 universities & 30 among the top 5,000 universities; More info: National rankings of Iranian universities; Complete list for top 12,000 universities	2009
World's largest universities by enrollment	3	World	List of largest universities by enrollment	Islamic Azad University is the world's third largest university with more than 1.3 million students enrolled, it is also the world's largest private university	2010
World's Top Engineering Universities	184	World	Quacquarelli Symonds	University of Tehran stands at 184th and Sharif University of Technology stands at 244th place among the world's top engineering universities	2007
Academic Ranking of World Universities	401	500	ARWU	University of Tehran is ranked at 401st among the world top 500 universities. More info: ARWU 2010 Report.	2010
Ratio of % of universities among top 500 per % share of total GDP by country	34	World	Ministry of Education (New Zealand)	Ranking based on overall world universities ranking equalized against size of national economy to control for the fact that more wealthy nations can support their higher education systems to a greater degree due to higher funding availability, thus measuring the quality of higher education adjusted for money spent on it.	2009
Quality of math & science education	35	World	World Economic Forum	Measure of math and science education quality	2011

== Energy ==
Rankings
Name	Rank	Out of	Source	Notes	Year
Energy consumption per capita	57	World	World Resources Institute	23,748 kW·h/year/person. In 2010, per capita energy intensity in Iran was 15 times higher than in Japan and 10 times higher than the European Union.	2003
Primary energy consumption	13	World	International Energy Agency	Energy, production of about 3,845 terawatt-hours (13.119×10^{15} BTU) per year (per 2000 U.S. dollars). By 2009 Iran stood at 11th worldwide, annually consuming 204.8 million TOE.	2006
Primary energy production	6	World	International Energy Agency	Energy, consumption of 2,253 terawatt-hours (7.686×10^{15} BTU) per year (per 2000 U.S. dollars)	2006
Energy intensity	1	World	International Energy Agency	2.5 times the Middle Eastern average in 2010; 14,120 tonnes of oil equivalent/$1 million of GDP in 2006. More info: Fuel smuggling in Iran.	2010
Total proven coal reserves	12	59	United Nations	11,143 million tonnes of reserves	2005
Total coal production	32	73	United Nations	1,330,000 tonnes per year	2005
Aviation gasoline exports	6	34	United Nations	Ranked among exporting countries; Iran: 10,000 tonnes/year	2005
Gross inland availability of aviation gasoline	4	131	United Nations	95,000 tonnes of aviation gasoline available per year inside country	2005
Proven natural gas reserves	1	209	CIA World Factbook	Total proven reserves of 33.1 trillion cubic meters or 15.8% of the world's total reserves. More info: Natural gas fields of Iran & Natural gas reserves in Iran. Market value of Iran's total natural gas reserves at comparative international energy price of $75 per barrel of oil stands at ~US $4 trillion.	2012
Proven natural gas reserves per capita	5	71	CIA World Factbook	364,609 cubic meters per person	2005
Natural gas production	4	183	CIA World Factbook	Annual production of 131.2 billion cubic meters. Annual production of ~220 billion cubic meters (0.6 billion cubic meters/day) in 2010.	2007
Natural gas consumption	3	183	CIA World Factbook	Total annual natural gas consumption of 131.7 billion m^{3}. Iran has the world's fastest growth rate in natural gas consumption. Iran by 2011 had 80 years' worth of gas reserves based on 2010 production levels. More info: Peak gas, Natural gas by country.	2009
Natural gas exports	25	182	CIA World Factbook	Annual exports of 6.2 billion cubic meters	2007
Natural gas imports	27	182	CIA World Factbook	Annual imports of 6.1 billion cubic meters	2007
Natural gas consumption by households	5	67	United Nations	Annual household natural gas usage of 1,243,256 Tera-joules	2005
Proven oil reserves	3	97	CIA World Factbook	Total proven reserves of 136.2 billion barrels (2.165×10^{10} m^{3}), or ~ 1,750 barrels (278 m^{3}) of oil per Iranian citizen. Market value of Iran's total oil reserves at international crude price of $75 per barrel stands at ~US $10 trillion.	2007
Oil production	4	210	CIA World Factbook	Daily production of ~4.2 million barrels (670,000 m^{3})	2008
Oil R/P ratio	1	World	Statistical Review of World Energy	Iran has the world's highest R/P ratio of 89.4 years for oil.	2010
Oil consumption	15	208	CIA World Factbook	Daily consumption of 1.63 million barrels (259,000 m^{3})	2006
Oil exports	8	205	CIA World Factbook	Daily exports of 2.21 million barrels (351,000 m^{3}). More info: Iranian oil bourse, OPEC Annual Statistical Bulletin; Countries importing Iranian oil in 2011.	2009
Oil exports per capita	20	84	United Nations	1.94 tonnes exported annually per person (~12 barrels (1.9 m^{3})/person/year)	2005
Oil imports	52	206	CIA World Factbook	Iran imports 153,600 barrels (24,420 m^{3}) of oil per day	2004
Total hydrocarbon reserves (Combined reserves of oil and gas)	2	World	Oil & Gas Journal	Total hydrocarbon reserves of Iran including both oil and natural gas measured in barrel of oil equivalent (BOE) stands at 301.7 billion, just after Saudi Arabia's 302.5 billion BOE and ahead of Russia's 198.3 billion BOE. Alternatively, Iranian government puts the total reserve at 324 billion BOE. Iran is the only country with large reserves of both gas and oil. It is also the only country with large hydrocarbon reserves, which has the potential to massively increase its production due to its current low production levels.	2010
Nuclear power rankings of nations	27	World	IAEA	Current Iranian nuclear generated electricity capacity is: 915 Mwh. Iran plans to produce 23,000 MWh of nuclear generated electricity in the future using 19 nuclear power plants. More info: Iranian nuclear program and Nuclear facilities in Iran.	2012
Uranium reserves / Uranium by country		World	World Nuclear Association	As of 2009 Iran had an estimated total uranium reserves of 20,300 tonnes recoverable at a cost of less than $260/kg. As per WNA, Iran's 2012 uranium requirement for power generation was 170 tonnes.	2009
Electricity production	19	210	CIA World Factbook	~193.3 terawatt-hours/year. More info: Electricity in Iran through history and List of power stations in Iran.	2007
Electricity consumption	20	190	CIA World Factbook	Consumption of 136.2 terawatt-hours/year, or 224 watt-hours per person. All settlements with 20 or more families are electrified.	2005
Electricity exports	39	186	CIA World Factbook	Annual exports of ~2.8 terawatt-hours. Iran's electricity exports rose to 5.5 TWh in 2009.	2006
Electricity imports	46	188	CIA World Factbook	Electricity imports of 2.54 TWh/year	2006
Electricity production per capita	86	214	CIA World Factbook	~2,747 kWh per capita/year	2006
Electric power transmission losses as % of total output	30	131	World Bank	Electrical transmission loss: 16.88% of output	2004
Natural gas consumption by power plants	5	97	United Nations	Annual usage of 1,379,527 tera-joules by power stations	2005
Installed wind power capacity	35	76	World Wind Energy Association	Current installed capacity of 82 MWh. Iran's installed Wind power capacity growth rate= 49.4%. More info: Wind farms of Iran.	2008
Largest hydroelectric power stations	44	48	List of largest hydroelectric power stations	Power stations with 2000 MW capacity or more. Iran operates three such dams out of 48 in the world. Total number of dams: 186 operational, 91 under construction. Ranked 3rd worldwide in terms of dams under construction. More info: Energy in Iran and List of reservoirs and dams in Iran.	2010
Diesel usage by power plants	6	171	United Nations	2,708,000 tonnes of diesel used by thermal power plants	2005
Annual refinery output of diesel	13	124	United Nations	Annual production of 24,443,000 tonnes of diesel	2005
Electricity produced from natural gas	6	96	World Bank	125,393 GWh produced from natural gas	2004
Inland availability of diesel oils	11	191	United Nations	21,976,000 tonnes of diesel available per year	2005
Household consumption of diesel	8	149	United Nations	6,374,000 tonnes/year	2005
Private investment in public energy infrastructure	13	93	World Bank	$650,000,000/year	2004
Kerosene consumption by household & other consumers	4	174	United Nations	6,043,000 tonnes/year	2005
Kerosene imports per year	3	166	United Nations	1,105,000 tonnes imported/year	1997
Coal imports	50	110	United Nations	520,000 tonnes imported/year	2005
Liquefied Petroleum Gas Exports	12	93	United Nations	1,791,000 tonnes exported/year	2005
Total motor gasoline (petrol) production	16	121	United Nations	Annual gasoline production of 11,154,000 tonnes	2005
Motor gasoline energy balance requirement	2	205	United Nations	Energy balance requirement of 6,677,000 tonnes of gasoline (petrol). Energy balance requirement is the amount of energy a country needs to import for its needs due to its local non-availability because of production shortage.	2005
Motor gasoline (petrol) imports	5	200	United Nations	6,677,000 tonnes imported/year	2005
Natural gasoline production	4	21	United Nations	1,855,000 tonnes produced	2005
Residual fuel oil consumption by households	3	116	United Nations	1,619,000 tonnes/year consumed by households	2005
Jet fuel imports	64	166	United Nations	Annual importation of 80,000 tonnes of jet fuel	1990
Annual output of jet fuel	37	108	United Nations	Annual production of 850,000 tonnes jet fuel	2005
Least expensive diesel by country	2	World	German government	Diesel fuel prices in Iran are the second cheapest in the world. One liter of diesel costs in commodity barter comparison: ~0.3 of a hen egg.	2005
Least expensive gasoline by country	8	World	German government	Gasoline (petrol) fuel prices are the 8th cheapest in the world. Iran spends 8% of its total state revenue, subsidizing fuel for the domestic market.	2005
Energy Development Index	2	64	International Energy Agency	Index measures a country's per capita energy consumption, use of modern fuels and population's access to electricity.	2011

== Environment and ecology ==
Rankings
Name	Rank	Out of	Source	Notes	Year
Environmental Sustainability Index	132	146	Yale University	Survey was done indirectly and/or by estimation.	2005
Greenhouse emissions per capita	74	World	World Resources Institute	Based on data for carbon dioxide, methane, nitrous oxide, perfluorocarbon, hydrofluorocarbon, sulfur hexafluoride emissions as well as effects of land use change. Iran = 7.6 tonnes of Carbon dioxide equivalent per person/year.	2000
Number of species under threat of extinction	37	158	United Nations	54 species under threat of extinction	1999
Happy Planet Index	81	178	New Economics Foundation	The Happy Planet Index is a measure of the environmental efficiency of supporting citizens' well-being. Iran's index: 47.23	2009
Environmental Performance Index	78	153	Yale University/Columbia University	Iran's index=60.0. More info: Over-consumption and Dashboard of Sustainability.	2010
Total renewable water resources	58	151	CIA World Factbook	Iran has total renewable water resources of 137.5 cubic kilometers. More info: Water security, Water resources, and Peak water	2008
Water availability per capita	116	141	United Nations	Annual fresh water availability of 630 cubic meters per person. Measure of internal renewable water (average annual surface runoff and groundwater recharge generated from endogenous precipitation).	2001
Biodiversity Richness	13	53	World Conservation Monitoring Centre	Biodiversity Richness Index: 2	1994
Carbon efficiency	28	141	Carbon Dioxide Information Analysis Center	2.36 tonnes of CO_{2} emissions/$ of GDP	2005
Coral reefs area	19	28	United Nations	700 km^{2} of coral reefs	2005
Endangered species protection	71	141	CITES	69.6% of CITES requirement met	2000
Land use statistics by country	16	176	CIA World Factbook	Total cultivated land area of 221,400 square kilometers	2005
Carbon dioxide emissions per capita	70	210	United Nations	5.8 tonnes of CO_{2} emissions per person. More info: CO_{2} emissions per person map	2003
Total carbon dioxide emissions	11	210	United Nations	466,976,000 tonnes of carbon dioxide emissions or ~ 1.6% of the world's total emissions	2006
Total forest area	47	220	United Nations	110,750 square kilometers of forests	2007
Fresh water withdrawal	11	168	CIA World Factbook	Total annual water withdrawal of 72.88 km^{3}. Annual per capita withdrawal of 1,048 m^{3}. Rank of 19th by per capita withdrawal; 91% agriculture, 7% domestic, 2% industrial share of withdrawal.	2000
Industrial water pollution	14	129	World Bank	Metal industry contribution to total biochemical oxygen demand (BOD) emissions: 15.55%	2003

== General ==
Rankings
Name	Rank	Out of	Source	Notes	Year
Total area	18	233	United Nations	Area of 1,628,750 km^{2}; or ~1.1% of World's total area	2010
Deadliest earthquakes in history	8	World	List of natural disasters by death toll	856 Damghan earthquake killed more than 200,000 people in Iran on December 22, 856.	856
Countries by number of casualties from earthquakes	2	World	United Nations	Iran has the world's second highest number of casualties due to earthquakes per one million residents. More info: The natural disasters risk index.	2010
Number of major earthquakes	1	World	United Nations	Iran has the world's highest number of major earthquakes. Tremors occur daily somewhere in the country. More info: online earthquake monitoring (with GMT date & time stamp).	2010
Number of billionaires	—N/a	—N/a	List of Iranian people by net worth	Iran has an estimated 3 million "high net worth individuals", 32,000 individuals with a net worth of $3 million, 1,300 multimillionaires with net assets of $10 million or more and four billionaires (living in Iran). See also: Social class in Iran and List of high net worth Iranians abroad.	2016
World Giving Index	86	World	Charities Aid Foundation	Iran ranked 86th charitable nation worldwide with 35% of population having given money to charities, 38% of population having helped a stranger and only 12% having volunteered time. More info: World's most charitable nations.	2010
Intensity of natural background radiation	1	World	Natural background radiation at Ramsar	Highest natural radioactivity level in the world. Annual dose of 260 mSv. More info: Acute radiation syndrome and Ionizing radiation.	2010
% of water area	102	139	List of countries by percentage of water area	12,000 km^{2} of sovereign water area or ~0.73% of total sovereign area	2010
Length of coastline	50	196	List of countries by length of coastline	2,440 km of total coastline length, excluding 740 km of coastline with the Caspian Sea, which is landlocked.	2010
Land Area	18	World	List of countries and outlying territories by land area	1,636,000 km^{2} of land area	2010
World's largest islands	272	World	List of islands by area	Qeshm with an area of 1,336 km^{2} is the world's 272nd largest island (Greenland is the largest). More info: List of islands by highest point.	2010
World's highest points by country	22	World	List of countries by highest point	Damavand with a height of 5,610 m (18,406 ft). Damavand is also one of the Volcanic Seven Summits. More info: List of mountains in Iran and Extreme points of Earth.	2010
World's lowest points	17	World	List of countries by lowest point	Caspian Sea with a depth of 28 m below sea level is the world's 17th deepest natural point.	2010
World's largest deserts	23	World	List of deserts by area	Dasht-e Kavir is the 23rd and Dasht-e Lut is the 25th largest desert in the world.	2010
Most livable green countries	83	141	Reader's Digest	Composite measure of HDI and ESI	2008
Tea consumption per capita	5	World	World Market Research	Annual per capita tea consumption of 1.2 kg	2004
Coffee consumption per capita	132	World	World Resources Institute	Annual per capita coffee consumption of 0.1 kg	2006
Wheat consumption per capita	7	World	US government	Yearly consumption of ~195 kg per person	2004
Southernmost point by country	127	World	List of countries by southernmost point	South east of Sistan va Baluchestan at 25°03'35"N	2010
Northernmost point by country	60	World	List of countries by northernmost point	West Azarbaijan region at 39°46'38"N	2010
Easternmost point by country	44	World	List of countries by easternmost point	Sistan va Baluchestan region at 63°18'03"E	2010
Westernmost point by country	146	World	List of countries by westernmost point	West Azarbaijan region at 44°02'50"E	2010
Hottest Places on Planet Earth	1	World	NASA	Gandom-Beriyan in Dasht-e Lut is the world's hottest place with a recorded land (sand) temperature of 70.7 °C (159 °F). More info: Iran Meteorological Organization, List of weather records (states a record of 87 °C (188 °F) in Abadan, Iran in June 1967), and Climate records.	2005
Least expensive capital cities	1	World	CNN	Tehran is the world's least expensive capital city based on the cost-of-living index and is overall the second cheapest city after Karachi in the world. Cost of living comparison between two cities	2007
World's tallest towers	5	World	List of tallest buildings and structures in the world	Milad Tower is the world's fifth tallest tower and 14th tallest freestanding structure. More info: List of tallest structures in Iran and List of tallest freestanding structures in the world.	2010
Largest oil gushers in history	1	World	Oil gusher	Qum wildcat oil gusher blew on August 26, 1956, and had an uncontrollable gusher of 125,000 barrels per day (19,900 m^{3}/d) for three months before it was contained.	2010
World's oldest trees	3	World	Earth Watchers Center	Sarv-e-Abarkooh, at over 4,000 years of age, is the world's third oldest tree.	2010
World's largest sports stadiums	11	World	List of stadiums by capacity	Azadi Stadium with a seating capacity of 100,000 people is the world's 11th largest sports stadium as well as being the world's fourth largest football stadium and world's 44th largest sporting venue.	2010

== Globalization ==
Rankings
Name	Rank	Out of	Source	Notes	Year
Global Competitiveness Report	99	141	World Economic Forum	Report measures global economic competitiveness.	2019
Globalization Index	162	181	KOF Globalization Index	Survey was done indirectly &/or by estimation	2010
Economic complexity index	65	World	M.I.T (Visualization Atlas)	The Economic Complexity ranking of Iran has increased by 1 places over the past 50 years from 66th in 1964 to 65th in 2014.	2014

== Health ==
Rankings
Name	Rank	Out of	Source	Notes	Year
Suicide Rate	164	183	WHO	Total suicide rate = 3.6/100,000 people	2015
Tobacco Consumption per capita	71	182	WHO	835.51 Cigarettes smoked per adult per year.	2014
Alcohol consumption per capita	168	World	WHO	Per capita alcohol consumption of 1.00 liters per year; More info: Alcohol and cancer & Alcoholic liver disease	2010
% of population with access to essential drugs	54	163	World Health Organization	Categorized in medium access level of 80%; Number of factories producing medicine: 122	2000
Female % of HIV positive population 15+ years	107	112	World Bank	16.67% of over-15 years old HIV+ population is female	2005
Incidence of tuberculosis per 100,000 people	144	200	World Bank	23.48 per 100,000 People; 100% of all patients are under proper medical treatment as per WHO guidelines	2005
Physicians per 1000 people	138	202	World Bank	0.45 physicians/1000 people; Alternative WHO 2005 indicators: Total Physicians=61,870, Pharmaceutical personnel density=0.2/1000 People, Nursing and midwifery personnel density=1.6/1000 People, Dentistry personnel density=0.2/1000 People	2004
Prevalence of opiate addiction	1	132	United Nations	Prevalence rate of 2.8% of population; Almost all opiates smuggled into Iran from Afghanistan; Initiation age for most Iranian addicts is their 20s; More info: Rankings of most harmful drugs	1999
Annual cannabis use by country	31	67	United Nations	Annual prevalence rate of 4.2% of population	1999
HIV/AIDS prevalence rate	153	171	CIA World Factbook	HIV/AIDS Prevalence Rate of 0.1% of Population; Recent WHO report puts the number of HIV+ people at 110,000 people or ~0.16% of population in 2007 & accelerating; In past the primary mode of transmission was by syringe sharing among drug addicts but it is now being replaced by high risk sexual contacts; Iran in 2003 had over 700,000 cases of sexually transmitted infections	2001
Deaths due to HIV/AIDS	47	153	CIA World Factbook	4,300 people die annually because of AIDS/HIV infection; Recent WHO report puts the number of deaths at 6,000 in 2007 WHO report puts the coverage of antiretroviral therapy at 6%	2007
Prevalence of HIV among population aged 15-49 years	104	148	World Bank	Listed from highest rate to lowest; Iran: 0.15% of 15- to 49-year-olds are HIV+; Recent WHO report puts the % of HIV+ 15- to 49-year-olds at 0.3% in 2007	2005
Access to Sanitation	22	129	CIA World Factbook	99% of population have access to proper sanitation	2003
% of Population undernourished	76	76	United Nations	Listed from highest malnourishment rates to lowest; Iran: less than 5% of population is malnourished; More info: Fruit and Vegetable Consumption in Iran & Nutrition Landscape Information System for Iran & United Nations map of the world showing % of national population suffering from undernourishment	2009
Prevalence of contraceptive use among women	25	176	World Bank	74% of women aged 15–49 use contraceptives; alternately ranked by UN at 12th/89 with 73% prevalence; Most widely used method is "contraceptive pill"; More info: Contraceptive security	2000
Hospital beds/1000 people	133	191	World Bank	Hospital beds/1000 population: 1.6/1000; 758 hospitals, 225,000 hospital beds, 438 emergency centers	2001
Underweight children rate	63	95	United Nations	Ranking is from highest rate to lowest; Iran: ~2% of children are underweight	2005
Dietary caloric intake	40	World	FAO	Iranians on average consume 3040 kcal/person/day; More info: Nutrition	2007
Malaria cases per 100,000 of population	72	94	United Nations/Complete report for Iran	Ranking is from highest rate to lowest; Malaria cases in Iran: 27/100,000 of population	2001
World ranking of overall national health systems	93	190	WHO	Ranked from best overall health care systems to worst; More info: Health literacy	2000
World ranking of national health system performance & attainment	58	191	WHO	Ranking is based on composites of overall health care system, health level & distribution, responsiveness level & distribution, fairness in financial contribution, overall health goals attainment and per capita health expenditure	1997
Total health expenditure per capita	69	World	WHO	US $678 spent on health per person; Total health expenditure is 6.8% of GDP (PPP)	2006
% of under-5-year-old children with ARI taken to health provider	3	80	United Nations	93% of children with Acute Respiratory Infection taken to health provider	2002
% of total births attended by skilled health staff	35	158	Save the Children	97% of all births attended by skilled health staff; Ranked among 43 developed & 115 developing countries, totaling 158	2009
Expenditure on health as % of GDP	75	188	World Bank	6.6% of GDP is spent on health	2004
% of babies exclusively breastfed for 6 months	30	125	United Nations	44% of babies exclusively breastfed for the first six months of life; More info: Facts on Breastfeeding	1995–2002
% of households consuming iodized salt	15	112	United Nations	94% of households consume iodized salt	1997–2002
Out of pocket health expenditure as % of private expenditure on health	64	187	World Bank	94.8% of private health expenditure is out of pocket; More info: Health care system and Publicly funded health care	2004
Prepaid plans as % of private health expenditure	75	187	WHO	Prepaid plans constitute 2.9% of private health funding; More info: Universal health care	2002
Government expenditure on health per capita	84	185	WHO	Government spends $206 per person/Year	2002
Total expenditure on health per capita	69	185	WHO	Total health expenditure by government & private sectors: $432 Per capita/Year	2002
Total population suffering from undernourishment	92	103	Countries by undernourishment rate	Listed from highest rate to lowest; Iran: 4% of population is undernourished	2006
Probability of not reaching 40 years of age	73	111	United Nations	Listed from highest probability to lowest; Iran: 9.3%	2001
Probability of reaching 65 years of age (males)	62	159	United Nations	Listed from highest probability to lowest; Iran: 68.9%	2000
Probability of reaching 65 years of age (females)	91	159	United Nations	Listed from highest probability to lowest; Iran: 74.3%	2000
Total number of kidney transplants/Year	20	47	Worldwide Transplant Center Directory	228 kidneys transplanted in 2002; Iran ranked 4th worldwide in 2007 with more than 2000 transplants performed annually	2002
Kidney transplants per capita	35	47	Worldwide Transplant Center Directory	3.35205 kidney transplants per 1 million people/Year	2002
Countries by total disability-adjusted life year (DALY) rate	110	194	WHO	Iran has total DALY rate of 175.2 years per 1000 of population; Ranked from highest DALY rate to lowest; More information: The burden of disease & injury in Iran & Global burden of disease & World Health Statistics 2009	2004
Countries by disability-adjusted life year (DALY) rate for Tuberculosis	118	194	WHO	DALY rate of 0.78 year/1000 people for TB; Ranked from highest DALY rate to lowest	2004
Countries by disability-adjusted life year (DALY) rate for Sexually Transmitted Diseases (STDs) excluding HIV/AIDS	100	194	WHO	DALY rate of 1.1 years/1000 people for STDs excluding HIV/AIDS; Ranked from highest DALY rate to lowest	2004
Countries by disability-adjusted life year (DALY) rate for HIV/AIDS	102	194	WHO	DALY rate of 0.83 year/1000 people for AIDS/HIV; Ranked from highest DALY rate to lowest	2004
Countries by disability-adjusted life year (DALY) rate for Diarrhea	89	194	WHO	DALY rate of 4.4 years/1000 people for diarrhea; Ranked from highest DALY rate to lowest	2004
Countries by disability-adjusted life year (DALY) rate for Meningitis	122	194	WHO	DALY rate of 0.50 year/1000 people for meningitis; Ranked from highest DALY rate to lowest	2004
Countries by disability-adjusted life year (DALY) rate for Hepatitis B	88	194	WHO	DALY rate of 0.14 year/1000 people for hepatitis B; Ranked from highest DALY rate to lowest; Higher DALYs in risk groups e.g. truck drivers	2004
Countries by disability-adjusted life year (DALY) rate for Hepatitis C	89	194	WHO	DALY rate of 0.07 year/1000 people for hepatitis C; Ranked from highest DALY rate to lowest	2004
Countries by disability-adjusted life year (DALY) rate for Respiratory Infections	105	194	WHO	DALY rate of 4.62 years/1000 people for Respiratory infections; Ranked from highest DALY rate to lowest	2004
Countries by disability-adjusted life year (DALY) rate for Maternal conditions	76	194	WHO	DALY rate of 5.49 years/1000 people for Maternal conditions; Ranked from highest DALY rate to lowest	2004
Countries by disability-adjusted life year (DALY) rate for Perinatal conditions	77	194	WHO	DALY rate of 15.97 years/1000 people for Perinatal conditions; Ranked from highest DALY rate to lowest	2004
Countries by disability-adjusted life year (DALY) rate for Malnutrition	93	194	WHO	DALY rate of 4.24 years/1000 people for Malnutrition; Ranked from highest DALY rate to lowest; More info: Obesity in Iran & Obesity Scale Country Comparison & Facts on Malnutrition & Map of Obesity	2004
Countries by disability-adjusted life year (DALY) rate for Cancers	148	194	WHO	DALY rate of 7.63 years/1000 people for Cancers; Ranked from highest DALY rate to lowest; More info: Cancer Country Profile	2004
Countries by disability-adjusted life year (DALY) rate for Diabetes	121	194	WHO	DALY rate of 2.77 years/1000 people for Diabetes; Ranked from highest DALY rate to lowest	2004
Countries by disability-adjusted life year (DALY) rate for Neuro-Psychiatric conditions	46	194	WHO	DALY rate of 34.41 years/1000 people for Neuro-Psychiatric diseases: Neurological and psychiatric conditions; Ranked from highest DALY rate to lowest	2004
Countries by disability-adjusted life year (DALY) rate for diseases of sensory organs	49	194	WHO	DALY rate of 12.84 years/1000 people for diseases of Sensory organs: Eye diseases and Ear diseases; Ranked from highest DALY rate to lowest	2004
Countries by disability-adjusted life year (DALY) rate for Cardiovascular diseases	80	194	WHO	DALY rate of 21.63 years/1000 people for Cardiovascular diseases; Ranked from highest DALY rate to lowest; More info: Physical Inactivity Prevalence in Iran & Raised Cholesterol Prevalence in Iran & Raised Blood Pressure Prevalence in Iran	2004
Countries by disability-adjusted life year (DALY) rate for Respiratory diseases	134	194	WHO	DALY rate of 6.18 years/1000 people for Respiratory diseases; Ranked from highest DALY rate to lowest	2004
Countries by disability-adjusted life year (DALY) rate for Digestive diseases	169	194	WHO	DALY rate of 3.44 years/1000 people for Digestive diseases; Ranked from highest DALY rate to lowest	2004
Countries by disability-adjusted life year (DALY) rate for Genito-Urinary diseases	123	194	WHO	DALY rate of 1.86 years/1000 people for Genito-urinary diseases; Ranked from highest DALY rate to lowest; More info: Prevalence of circumcision	2004
Countries by disability-adjusted life year (DALY) rate for Skin diseases	145	194	WHO	DALY rate of 0.42 years/1000 people for Skin diseases; Ranked from highest DALY rate to lowest	2004
Countries by disability-adjusted life year (DALY) rate for Musculoskeletal diseases	130	194	WHO	DALY rate of 3.83 years/1000 people for Musculoskeletal diseases; Ranked from highest DALY rate to lowest; Example: Burden of osteoporosis in Iran	2004
Countries by disability-adjusted life year (DALY) rate for Congenital Anomalies	82	194	WHO	DALY rate of 4.41 years/1000 people for Congenital anomalies; Ranked from highest DALY rate to lowest	2004
Countries by disability-adjusted life year (DALY) rate for Oral diseases	37	194	WHO	DALY rate of 2.13 years/1000 people for Oral diseases; Ranked from highest DALY rate to lowest	2004
Countries by disability-adjusted life year (DALY) rate for All Accidents	29	194	WHO	DALY rate of 29.7 years/1000 people for Un-intentional Injuries; Ranked from highest DALY rate to lowest; More info: Economic compensation of accidental injuries in Iran	2004
Countries by disability-adjusted life year (DALY) rate for Intentional Injuries	138	194	WHO	DALY rate of 3.2 years/1000 people for Intentional Injuries; Ranked from highest DALY rate to lowest; Economic loss of 0.49% of GDP/Year due to violence & intentional injuries	2004
Total healthy life expectancy at birth	119	192	WHO	Total Healthy life expectancy (HALE) of 57.6 years on average at birth; Ranked from highest healthy life expectancy to lowest	2004
Male healthy life expectancy at birth	117	192	WHO	Male Healthy life expectancy (HALE) of 56.1 years on average at birth; Ranked from highest healthy life expectancy to lowest	2004
Male healthy life expectancy at 60 years of age	132	192	WHO	Male Healthy life expectancy (HALE) of 10.4 years on average at 60 years of age; Ranked from highest healthy life expectancy to lowest	2004
Female healthy life expectancy at birth	118	192	WHO	Female Healthy life expectancy (HALE) of 59.1 years on average at birth; Ranked from highest healthy life expectancy to lowest	2004
Female healthy life expectancy at 60 years of age	121	192	WHO	Female Healthy life expectancy (HALE) of 11.9 years on average at 60 years of age; Ranked from highest healthy life expectancy to lowest	2004
Expectation of lost healthy years at birth (Male)	2	192	WHO	Expectation of lost healthy years (Male) of 10.4 years on average at birth; Ranked from highest loss of healthy years to lowest; Iran is 2nd after Yemen in the world & followed by Iraq	2004
Expectation of lost healthy years at birth (Female)	1	192	WHO	Expectation of lost healthy years (Female) of 12.5 years on average at birth; Ranked from highest loss of healthy years to lowest; Iran has the highest loss of healthy years for females in the world	2004
Urban sulfur dioxide pollution	1	141	World Health Organization	City SO_{2} concentration: 209 micrograms/m^{3}; More info: WHO map of deaths due to air pollution	1995
Country Rank by Top World Hospitals	21	World	Webometrics	Iran has one hospital among world's top 200 hospitals, 2 in top 500 and 4 in top 1000	2009

== History and culture ==
Rankings
Name	Rank	Out of	Source	Notes	Year
Oldest countries on earth	1	World	List of countries by statehood	Iran with its inception in 3200 BC, is the oldest country in the world. More info: History of Iran and List of sovereign states by formation date	2010
World Tourism rankings	5	Middle East	United Nations	5.2 million foreign tourists visited Iran in 2015.	2015
World heritage sites	10	239	United Nations	30 World Heritage Sites; More info: List of the world heritage sites	2026
Longest defensive wall	2	World	List of walls	Great Wall of Gorgan is the second longest defensive wall in existence after the Great Wall of China	2010
World's oldest artificial water reservoirs	1	World	Qanat	The world's oldest water reservoir is in Gonabad, is more than 2700 years old & is still in use; It is also the world's largest qanat; More info: Iranian architecture	2010
Sovereign jewels collection	1	World	Iranian National Jewels	World's largest collection of jewels	2010
Number of former national capitals	1	World	List of former national capitals	Highest number of national capital relocations; Iran has had 31 former capitals before Tehran	2010
Largest producers of handmade carpets	1	World	Carpet	Iran produces 3/4 of the world's handmade carpets; Iran has 30% share of the world's carpet export market; Iran has also produced the world's largest handmade carpet, measuring 60,546 square feet. More info: Carpet Museum of Iran	2010
Total cinema attendance	19	78	United Nations	26,000,000 attendances	2003
Number of cinema seats	15	60	United Nations	173,000 Cinema seats in total	1995

== Industry and mining ==
Rankings
Name	Rank	Out of	Source	Notes	Year
World's Largest Petroleum Companies	2	World	Energy Intelligence	The Iranian government-owned corporation of NIOC after Aramco is the world's second-largest petroleum company.	2008
World's largest mining companies	23	World	World Bank	Iran's national mining corporation (IMIDRO) is the world's 23rd largest mining company with 0.6% of the world's total mining production	2007
World's Largest State Owned Corporations	7	World	Financial Times	National Iranian Oil Company with a market capitalization of US$220 billion in 2006 ranked 7th worldwide.	2006
Industrial production growth rate	28	161	CIA World Factbook	Industrial growth rate of 4.0% annually; Alternatively put at 7.4% by Iranian government	2009
List of countries by motor vehicle production	12	52	International Organization of Automobile Manufacturers	1,395,421 automobiles manufactured in 2009; During period 2000-2010 Iran after China had the highest growth in automobile manufacturing; Over 1.6 million vehicles & 1 million motorcycles were produced in 2010; More info: Automotive industry in Iran	2009
High Technology Exports per capita	114	167	World Bank	High-technology exports are products with high R&D intensity, such as in nuclear, aerospace, computers, pharmaceuticals, scientific instruments and electrical machinery; Iran: ~1,461 $ per 1,000 people/Year	2004
Petrochemical production	45	World	Chemical & Engineering News	Iran is the world's 45th largest chemical producer with an annual production sale value of 7.8 billion dollars; NIOC of Iran with ~1.67 million barrels per day (266,000 m^{3}/d) ranks 11th globally in terms of total oil refining capacity; NIPC of Iran plans to become world's second largest producer of chemicals by 2015, Iran also plans to become world's second largest exporter of Polymers	2008
Non-energy use of bitumen asphalt	6	130	United Nations	Annual use of 3,496,000 tonnes of asphalt	2005
Trademarks Per capita	33	142	World Bank	Trademarks are distinctive signs that identify/protect goods or services as those produced by an enterprise or individual; Iran: ~153 per 1 million people. More info: Intellectual property in Iran	2001
Non-energy use of lubricants	9	147	United Nations	770,000 tonnes of lubricants used annually	2005
Usage of naphtha by industry	13	45	United Nations	Annual use of 2,492,000 tonnes of naphtha	2005
Industrial electricity consumption per capita	73	171	United Nations	~692 kWh per capita/Year	2005
Industrial use of residual oil	5	142	United Nations	6,869,000 tonnes used/Year of residual oil	2005
Quantity of value added manufacturing	29	155	World Bank	21.22 billion constant year 2000 US$/Year of value added manufacturing	2005
Bagasse consumption by industry	27	80	United Nations	1,206,000 tonnes of Bagasse consumed by industry annually	2005
Diesel consumption by industry	15	128	United Nations	1,798,000 tonnes/Year	2005
Total lubricant production	10	86	United Nations	Annual lubricants production of 955,000 tonnes	2005
Natural gas consumption by chemical industry	9	66	United Nations	Annual usage of 138,966 Tera-joules	2005
Blast furnace gas consumption by industry	19	47	United Nations	10,102 Tera-joules of blast furnace gas consumed/Year	2005
Coal consumption by industry	42	89	United Nations	330,000 tonnes/Year	2005
Steel production by country	16	World	World Steel Association/US Geological Survey	More than 10.9 million tonnes/Year in 2009; Iran's production capacity reached 20 million tonnes/year in 2010; Iran plans to increase its steel production to more than 35 million tonnes/year by 2015	2009
Copper mine production	12	World	British Geological Survey	Annual production of 249,100 tonnes	2006
Aluminium production	17	World	List of countries by aluminium production	Annual production of 457,000 tonnes	2006
Cement production	5	World	List of countries by cement production / Pie Chart of World's Production	2009: Annual production of 45 million tonnes, or ~1.6% of the world's total output & total production capacity of 55 million tonnes annually; Iran ranks 10th globally in terms of cement export See also: Construction in Iran	2010
Iron production	8	World	US Geological Survey	Annual production of 33 million tonnes	2009
Gypsum production	2	World	British Geological Survey	Iran is the world's 2nd largest producer after China	2006
Iron ore production	8	World	US Geological Survey	Annual production of 33 million tonnes	2009
Production of natural iron oxide	9	World	US Geological Survey	Annual production of 2,600 tonnes	2006
Production of ammonia	21	World	US Geological Survey	Annual ammonia production of 1.02 million tonnes	2006
Reserves of Zinc	1	World	British Geological Survey	Iran has the world's largest zinc reserves, in addition to 2nd largest reserves of copper, ninth largest reserves of iron and eleventh largest reserves of lead	2010
Industrial imports by country	28	World	World Trade Organization	Iran ranks 28th globally in terms of importation of industrial machinery	2004

== Military and defense ==
Rankings
Name	Rank	Out of	Source	Notes	Year
Composite Index of National Capability (CINC)	15	World	Correlates of War	CINC is a statistical measure of national hard power as opposed to soft power representing demographic, economic and military strength of a nation; Index of Iran=0.013450, Index of World's total capability=1.	2007
Military expenditures	24	154	SIPRI	Total annual military budget of 9.17 billion dollars. In 2010 the Iranian government put the total security and defence budget including that of army, IRGC, police, military R&D, intelligence agencies, etc. at $17.14 billion.	2009
List of countries by military expenditure per capita	62	World	CIA World Factbook	Iranian military per capita expenditure of US$64.77	2008
Military expenditure as % of GDP	37	154	SIPRI	Iran spends 2.7% of its GDP on its military defense; More info: Comparison of world's expenditure on military, health and education	2008
Total number of troops	7	World	CSIS	Total troops numbering 3,833,000; More info: Rank insignia of the Iranian military	2009
Male manpower fit for military service	15	234	CIA World Factbook	17.67 million males fit for military service	2009
Male manpower reaching military service age annually	15	234	CIA World Factbook	700,213 males reach military service age annually	2009
List of countries by size of police forces	30	60	CSIS	Police force size of 40,000 personnel	2006
Private gun & firearms ownership	79	178	Small Arms Survey	7.3 guns owned privately per 100 civilian residents; There were 3.5 million small arms owned by Iranian residents	2007
Arms exports/Year	37	40	SIPRI	Iran's arms exports in 2005: US $1 million; Iran is prohibited from exporting its locally manufactured military equipment by United Nations Security Council; Iran is currently facing the longest sanction in modern history; More info: Sanctions against Iran & Iran and Libya Sanctions Act & CASMII; Iran's weapons exports were US$2 million in 2008	2005
Arms imports/Year	17	169	World Bank	Iran's arms imports in 2005: US $403 million; More info: Iran's weapons's imports in 2008 were US$91 million, Iran is banned from importing weapons by United Nations Security Council sanctions of 2010; Iranian arms imports comparison by CSIS	2005
Arms imports per capita/Year	60	169	World Bank	Approximately 6 dollars per Person per Year	2005
Deadliest wars and armed conflicts	18	World	List of wars and disasters by death toll	The defensive war which Iran fought when Iraq tried to invade Iran is the 18th most bloody war in history of mankind; Iran has not been engaged in an offensive war since the Battle of Karnal in 1739.	2010
List of countries by number of UN peacekeepers	107	World	United Nations	Iran had two military personnel working as UN peacekeepers at conflict zones around the world	2010
Most heavily mined countries	2	World	WHO	16 million mines	2003

== Politics ==
Rankings
Name	Rank	Out of	Source	Notes	Year
Global Peace Index	104	149	Economist Intelligence Unit	More info: GPI map for 2010	2010
Political orientation as % of far left proponents in population	9	61	World Values Survey	7.3% of population hold far left political views; More info: Map of Iran's political blogosphere	2005
Political orientation as % of far right proponents in population	40	61	World Values Survey	3.9% of population hold far right political views	2005
Corruption Perceptions Index	131	176	Transparency International	See also: Crime in Iran	2016
Irregular payments & bribes	69	World	World Economic Forum	Extent of bribery in business environment	2010
Worldwide press freedom index	166	169	Reporters Without Borders	More info: Countries ranked by journalists killed	2007
Democracy Index	145	167	Economist Intelligence Unit		2008
% Female ministers as of total ministers	23	125	Inter-Parliamentary Union	Females: 27.1% of government at ministerial level	2000
List of countries by Failed States Index	38	177	Fund For Peace	More info: Foreign relations of Iran	2009
Presidential election voting age population	10	91	Institute for Democracy and Electoral Assistance	32,585,700 eligible voters for presidential elections; More info: Politics of Iran	2003
Freedom of the Press (report)	184	196	Freedom House	More info: Media of Iran	2009
Limited government index	73	World	Freedom Meta-Index	Index measuring the relative size of the government in people's lives	2011
Public trust of politicians	39	World	World Economic Forum	Degree of public trust in ethical standards of their politicians.	2010

== Religion ==
Rankings
Name	Rank	Out of	Source	Notes	Year
Muslim population	7	67	Demographics of Islam	7th largest Muslim population in the world; More info: List of countries by Muslim population	2005
Muslims as % of population	6	168	International Religious Freedom Report	98% of population is Muslim; More info: Religions by country	2004
Shia's as % of total Muslim population	1	67	Demographics of Islam	89% of Muslim population of the country is Shia	2005
Number of Shia Muslims by Country	1	67	Demographics of Islam	61,924,500 Shia Muslims; Second is India with an estimated population of 40 to 55 million as per 2001 Census followed by Pakistan with an estimated Shia population of 30 to 45 million. More info: Demographics of Shia Islam	2005
Sunni's as % of total Muslim population	67	67	Demographics of Islam	9% of Muslim population of the country is Sunni	2005
Bahá'í population by country	2	247	Bahá'í Faith by country	Population of 150,000-500,000	2004
Protestants population	98	167	Protestantism by country	Population of 204,054	2004
Population of Roman Catholics	149	170	Roman Catholicism by country	Population of 13,603	2004
Zoroastrian population by country	2	World	Zoroastrianism	Population of 24,000-30,000	2005
Jewish population of countries	24	89	World Jewish Congress	~25,000-40,000 Jews live in Iran according to various estimates	1998

== Science and technology ==
Rankings
Name	Rank	Out of	Source	Notes	Year
Scientific output	16	233	SCImago Journal & Country Rank	In 2018 Iran produced 60268 documents in all fields. Iran is ranked 8th in the field of pharmacology, toxicology and pharmaceutics. 9th in the field of chemical engineering.10th in the field of material science. 12th in the field of mathematics. 12th in the field of chemistry. 12th in the field of engineering. 14th in the field of agriculture and biological science. 14th in the field of physics and astronomy. 16th in the field of medicine. 17th in the field of biochemistry, genetics and monocular biology. 17th in the field of computer science. 12th in the field of energy.	2018
Global Innovation Index	81	139	World Intellectual Property Organization	Index measures enabling environment for innovation; More info: Creativity	2026
Science & Technology Growth Rate	1	World	Science-Metrix Report / Science-Metrix country graph comparison / Government of United Kingdom	Highest science & technology growth rate in the world, 1000% increase in 9 years (1995–2004); Iran has increased its academic publishing output from 0.0003% of world's total output in 1970 to 0.29% by 2004 (That is ~100000% growth in 33 years), by 2008 Iran's share had reached 1.02% of the world's total output (~340000% growth in 37 years); Iran's 2009 growth rate in science & technology was highest globally being 11 times faster than the world's average rate; Iran has been doubling its scientific output every 3 years; In 2009 ranked at 22nd by total scientific output; 19th in mathematics output, 17th in computer science applications output, 15th in nuclear technology output; 28th in physics output; 16th in aerospace technology output; 17th in medicine output, 13th in chemistry output & 15th in nanotechnology output More info: Science in newly industrialized countries; Iranian scientific publications online digital archive	2010
Total Research & Development spending in PPP US dollars	27	World	United Nations	Iran spends 6.2 billion US dollars in PPP terms equaling to ~0.7% of its GDP (PPP), Iran has 500 scientists & tech personnel working in R&D sector for every one million of population; More info: Iran National Science Foundation & Science of science policy & Science policy & Technology Life Cycle & Iranian cities among world's science cities	2010
Research and development spending	43	69	World Bank	About 0.5% of GDP was spent on research and development in year 2000; Iran's spending on R&D is to reach 3% of GDP by 2015; Government funds 75% of all Research in Iran	2000
Research and development spending per capita	58	69	World Bank	0.007351% of national GDP per 1 million people; More info: Emerging technologies	2000
Technology Achievement Index	45	68	United Nations	Technology Achievement Index measures creation of technology, diffusion of recent innovations, diffusion of old innovations & human skills; Iran's score: 0.26 out of 1; Iran ranks 1st in the region, 4th in Asia and 12th in the world in producing biological drugs. More info: Human capital	2001
Patents granted per capita	56	60	World Intellectual Property Organization	0.014702 Patents per one million people; More info: Intellectual property in Iran & Technological determinism	1998
Patents	21	World	World Intellectual Property Organization	More info: Patent & Business incubator	2021
Industrial Design	10	World	World Intellectual Property Organization	More info: Invention & Seed accelerator	2020
Trademarks	9	World	World Intellectual Property Organization	More info: Science park & Trademark	2019
Highest budget national space agencies	9	World	List of space agencies	ISA with $500 million/Year has the 9th highest budget of a national space organization in the world	2010
First orbital launches by country	9	World	Timeline of first orbital launches by country	Iran is the 9th country to reach space; More info: Outer Space Treaty	2010
Biological space launch capability	6	World	Animals in space	Iran is the sixth country to have launched animals into space & recover them alive	2010
Total human spaceflight time by country	21	World	List of spaceflight records	Iran stands 21st in terms of total time spent by its nationals in space; Only one Iranian (Anousheh Ansari) has spent ~11 person-days in space as a space tourist; More info: Timeline of space travel by nationality	2007

== Society ==
Rankings
Name	Rank	Out of	Source	Notes	Year
Quality-of-life index	58	80	Economist Intelligence Unit	Survey was done indirectly &/or by estimations	2013
Legatum Prosperity Index	92	110	Legatum Institute	Survey was done indirectly &/or by estimations	2010
Satisfaction with Life Index	96	178	Measure of subjective life satisfaction	Measurement of wealth, health and access to basic education; Score of Iran=200; More info: Sociocultural evolution & Happiness economics	2006
Incarceration Rate	57	217	International Centre for Prison Studies	222 Prisoners per 100,000 People	2009
% female prisoners as of total prison population	81	134	International Centre for Prison Studies	Females comprise 3.5% of prison population	2003
% pre-trial detainees as of total prison population	89	143	International Centre for Prison Studies	Pre-trial detainees comprise 24.8% of total prison population	2003
Homicide Rate	66	144	United Nations	Homicide rate of 2.93 intentional murders per 100,000 people	2009
Global Gender Gap Report	123	134	World Economic Forum	Survey was done indirectly &/or by estimation	2010
Mother's Index Rank	49	158	Save the Children: State of the World's Mothers report 2009	The index is a calculated composite measure of indicators for health, education, equality, economic freedom, nutrition & political status related to the well-being of mothers; Ranking is among 43 developed & 115 developing countries, totaling 158	2009
Women's Index Rank	45	158	Save the Children: State of the World's Mothers report 2009	The index is a calculated composite measure of indicators for health, education, equality, economic freedom, nutrition & political status related to the well-being of women; Ranking is among 43 developed & 115 developing countries, totaling 158	2009
Children's Index Rank	45	158	Save the Children: State of the World's Mothers report 2009	The index is a calculated composite measure of indicators for health, education, equality, economic freedom, nutrition & political status related to the well-being of children; Ranking is among 43 developed & 115 developing countries, totaling 158	2009
Child Development Index	68	143	Save the Children: Child Development Index 2008	Index measures education, health & nutrition of children	2000–2006
Sen Social Welfare Function	49	World	List of countries by Sen social welfare function	Iran is 49th in the world in terms of best social welfare function	2009
Gender-related Development Index	76	155	United Nations / Complete Report	Index shows the inequalities between men and women in these areas: long and healthy life, knowledge & a decent standard of living	2009
Gender Empowerment Measure	103	109	United Nations / Complete Report	Index measures inequalities between men's and women's opportunities in a country	2009
Sustainable Society Index	97	World	SSI rankings for 2010	Sustainable Society Index measures three dimensions of human, environmental and economical well-being; More info: SSI 2010 complete report	2010
World's best countries	79	World	Newsweek	Ranking of the world's best countries based on categories of education, health, quality of life, economic dynamism and political environment	2010
Drug Freedom Index	64	World	Freedom Meta-Index	Index measuring access to recreational drugs; In Iran: Illegal drug trade can have punishments ranging from fines to lashings, imprisonment & death penalty; Personal drug consumption is generally overlooked by law	2011
Judicial independence	65	World	World Economic Forum	The extent of judicial independence	2010

== Transport ==
Rankings
Name	Rank	Out of	Source	Notes	Year
Merchant marine capacity	31	148	CIA World Factbook	Iran owns a total of 188 ships of which 73 are Iranian flagged ships & 115 ships sail with foreign flags plus one additional foreign (UAE) owned ship sailing with Iranian flag; More info: Iran Shipping Lines; Iran also has a fleet of 46 marine tankers consisting of 28 VLCC, 9 Suezmax, 5 Aframax, 3 chemical vessels and a single LPG tanker; The total number of tankers is to be increased to 74 by 2013 and to more than 80 by 2015.; National Iranian Tanker Company was the world's fifth largest tanker operator with 43 ships in 2010 & is expected to become the world's third largest tanker company with 74 ships in 2013	2008
Rail transport network size	21	151	International Union of Railways	Total rail network length of 11,106 km; More info: Iran railways	2008
Road network size	29	191	CIA World Factbook	Total road network length of 172,927 km	2006
Total length of pipelines	8	120	CIA World Factbook	Total pipeline length of 36,509 km; condensate 7 km; condensate/gas 397 km; gas 19,161 km; liquid petroleum gas 570 km; oil 8,438 km; refined products 7,936 km; Iran ranks 4th worldwide by natural gas pipeline length having 32,000 km of gas pipelines in 2010 Iran plans to have 70,000 km of natural gas pipelines by 2025	2007
Length of Liquid Petroleum Gas Pipelines	6	17	CIA World Factbook	570 km of LPG pipelines	2006
Length of Oil Pipelines	6	97	CIA World Factbook	8,256 km of oil pipelines	2006
Rapid transit systems	20	53	Total rapid transit systems statistics by country	120.1 km of rapid transit network length with 64 stations	2002
Vehicles per capita	56	144	List of countries by vehicles per capita	175 automobiles per 1000 people in addition to 110 motorbikes per 1000 people; More info: Automotive industry in Iran & List of international vehicle registration codes	2010
Waterways length	70	109	CIA World Factbook	850 km of waterways	2008
Air transport, freight	59	176	World Bank	98.22 million tonnes-km/Year airlifted	2005
Air transport, passengers carried	26	177	World Bank	12,708,350 Air passengers/Year; More info: Countries with the most fatal civil airliner accidents	2005
Number of airports	26	251	CIA World Factbook	331 Operational airports	2007
Number of heliports	14	World	CIA World Factbook	19 Operational heliports	2010
Rail usage by Annual Passenger-Km Per Capita	26	32	International Union of Railways	Ranked among countries with more than 5 billion passenger-km/year; Iran: 180 passenger-km Per Capita/Year	2006
Rail usage by annual Billion Tonne-Kilometers/Year	20	32	International Union of Railways	Ranked among countries with more than 10 billion tonne-kilometers; Iran: 20.5 billion tonne-kilometers	2006
Metro systems by annual passenger rides	18	145	Tehran Metro	622.2 million passenger rides in 2010; Tehran Metro is the largest and busiest metro system in South Asia and the second largest and busiest in Middle East	2010
Total number of Airports with paved runways	20	227	CIA World Factbook	129 Operational airports with paved runways	2007
Number of airports with paved runways, length: over 3047 meters	4	161	CIA World Factbook	40 Airport runways with length of over 3047 m	2007
Gasoline (Petrol) consumption by transport sector	10	194	United Nations	Annual gasoline (petrol) consumption of 17,854,000 tonnes by vehicles	2005
Jet fuel bunker capacity	21	158	United Nations	National jet fuel bunker capacity of 850,000 tonnes	2005
Traffic related deaths per capita	11	World	List of countries by traffic-related death rate / Smeed's law / Epidemiology of motor vehicle collisions / Traffic injuries in Iran	35.8 people per 100,000 of population die in traffic accidents yearly; Total annual deaths of 22,918 and 685,000 injured according to WHO report 2009; Leading cause of premature death & disability in Iran; 1.3 million potential life-years lost annually; Male to female death ratio of 5 to 1; Most common causes: not wearing seat belt, tailgating, over-speeding, wrong overtakes, not wearing helmets, rapid changing of lanes, not signalling; Property damages worth more than $18 billion per year due to vehicle collisions; More info: Car accidents in Iran, Graph comparisons of Iran & Rapid motorization & traffic injuries in Iran & Statistical comparison of travel safety	2000
Number of Natural Gas Vehicles by Country	1	World	Worldwide NGV Statistics	Iran has the world's largest fleet of vehicles running on CNG at 2.86 million NGVs and 1,800 fueling stations by the end of 2011; Iran is also the world's fastest growing NGV market By end of 2011, Iran's refueling stations had a total of 10,656 gas dispensers with installed cumulative capacity of 1.93 million cubic meters per hour & supplying more than 17 million cubic meters of gas per day to NGV's; The number of fueling stations is to increase to 2,500 by the end of 2012 and to more than 3,000 in 2013	2011

== Notes ==
§.The surveys producing these world rankings have been done in different times and might not be current. Please refer to the specific articles or sources for updated information, where available. Furthermore, in most surveys only the important countries in the respective fields have been surveyed, thus the ranks might not be out of the whole world and all the countries. It should also be noted that the rankings are based on surveys by numerous entities with different benchmarks and standards, thus caution is needed in their interpretation of final results specially in the case of subjective field matters, as some of these rankings maybe based on speculative, biased, subjective or politicized evaluations. Finally, it is always important to consider trend when making comparisons, since single point data may be exceptional in nature (e.g. Iran's 2008 drought and wheat production).

== See also ==
- Lists by country
- Lists of countries and territories
