= Carbon Dioxide Information Analysis Center =

U.S. Department of Energy organization

- Abbreviation: CDIAC
- Established: 1982
- Defunct: September 30, 2017
- Type: Government research data centre
- Purpose: climate change data, greenhouse gas emissions, global warming
- Headquarters: Oak Ridge National Laboratory, Oak Ridge, Tennessee
- Region served: United States
- Parent organization: United States Department of Energy

The Carbon Dioxide Information Analysis Center (CDIAC) was an organization within the United States Department of Energy that had the primary responsibility for providing the US government and research community with global warming data and analysis as it pertains to energy issues. The CDIAC, and its subsidiary the World Data Center for Atmospheric Trace Gases, focused on obtaining, evaluating and distributing data related to climate change and greenhouse gas emissions.

CDIAC was founded in 1982 and was located within the Environmental Sciences Division of Oak Ridge National Laboratory. CDIAC closed September 30, 2017, and its data was distributed to a number of different repositories. The majority of the data was moved to the U.S. Department of Energy's (DOE) Environmental System Science Data Infrastructure for a Virtual Ecosystem (ESS-DIVE) archive that was led by Deborah Agarwal. The Oceanic Trace Gas data have been transitioned to the new Ocean Carbon Data System (OCADS) operated by NOAA's National Centers for Environmental Information (NCEI) at https://www.nodc.noaa.gov/ocads/. The Total Carbon Column Observing Network (TCCON) data have been transitioned to Caltech (http://tccondata.org/). HIAPER Pole-to-Pole Observations (HIPPO) data are transitioning to the NCAR Earth Observing Laboratory (https://www.eol.ucar.edu/data-software).

== See also ==
- Climate change in the United States
