= Deborah Agarwal =

American data scientist

Deborah Agarwal is a data scientist at Lawrence Berkeley National Laboratory who is known for her work in making data more accessible. She was elected a fellow of the American Geophysical Union in 2024.

== Education and career ==
Agarwal received her B.S. in mechanical engineering from Purdue University in 1985. She moved to the University of California, Santa Barbara where she received an M.S. in computer egnineering in 1991. In 1992, Agarwal was an intern at Lawrence Berkeley National Laboratory and she returned in 1994. In 1994 she earned her Ph.D. in computer engineering from the University of California, Santa Barbara and went on to hold jobs at General Motors and the Berkeley Water Center. In 2005 she moved to Lawrence Berkelely National Laboratory. She was director of the Scientific Data Division at Lawrence Berkeley National Laboratory from2005 until 2023, at which point she retired from the lab.

== Research ==
Agarwal is known for her work using data science to answer big scientific questions. She led the development of the ESS-DIVE project that established a means to store data in packages thereby allowing for a flexible means to store data, the project would later become a part of DataONE. As part of her work, Agarwal shared her perspective as a woman in data science when she acknowldged the stereotypes that may prevent women from considering careers in computer science.

== Awards and honors ==
In 2000, Agarwal was honored by San Francisco Women on the Web as one of the 'top 25 women on the web'. In 2023 she received an Honoris causa from the University of Rennes 1 for her work on scientific computing. In 2024, the American Geophysical Union elected Agarwal as a fellow.

== Selected publications ==
- Amir, Y.; Moser, L. E.; Melliar-Smith, P. M.; Agarwal, D. A.; Ciarfella, P. (1995). "The Totem single-ring ordering and membership protocol". ACM Transactions on Computer Systems. 13 (4): 311–342. doi:10.1145/210223.210224. ISSN 0734-2071.
- Agarwal, D.A.; Chevassut, O.; Thompson, M.R.; Tsudik, G. (2001). An integrated solution for secure group communication in wide-area networks. IEEE Comput. Soc. doi:10.1109/ISCC.2001.935350. ISBN 978-0-7695-1177-1.
- Pastorello, Gilberto; Trotta, Carlo; Canfora, Eleonora; et al. (2020-07-09). "The FLUXNET2015 dataset and the ONEFlux processing pipeline for eddy covariance data". Scientific Data. 7 (1). doi:10.1038/s41597-020-0534-3. ISSN 2052-4463. PMC 7347557. PMID 32647314.
- Crystal-Ornelas, Robert; Varadharajan, Charuleka; O’Ryan, Dylan; Beilsmith, Kathleen; Bond-Lamberty, Benjamin; Boye, Kristin; Burrus, Madison; Cholia, Shreyas; Christianson, Danielle S.; Crow, Michael; Damerow, Joan; Ely, Kim S.; Goldman, Amy E.; Heinz, Susan L.; Hendrix, Valerie C.; Kakalia, Zarine; Mathes, Kayla; O’Brien, Fianna; Pennington, Stephanie C.; Robles, Emily; Rogers, Alistair; Simmonds, Maegen; Velliquette, Terri; Weisenhorn, Pamela; Welch, Jessica Nicole; Whitenack, Karen; Agarwal, Deborah A. (2022-11-14). "Enabling FAIR data in Earth and environmental science with community-centric (meta)data reporting formats". Scientific Data. 9 (1). doi:10.1038/s41597-022-01606-w. ISSN 2052-4463. PMC 9663825. PMID 36376356.
