= List of countries by past cement production =

This is a list of countries by past cement production. All figures are rounded to three significant digits.

== World ==
Table 1 - Hydraulic Cement – World Leading Producers (million metric tons) (Note: U.S. Geological Survey, Mineral Commodity Summaries – Cement: 2000–2001; 2001–2002; 2002–2003; 2003–2004; 2004–2005; 2005–2006; 2006–2007; 2007–2008; 2008–2009; 2009–2010; 2010–2011; 2011–2012; 2012–2013; 2013–2014; 2014–2015; 2015–2016; 2016–2017; 2017–2018; 2018–2019)
Country	2023	2019	2018	2017	2016	2015	2014	2013	2012	2011	2010	2009	2008	2007	2006	2005	2004	2003	2002	2001	2000
Bangladesh	–	33	33	32	32	28	17	17	15	15											
Brazil	63	54	54	54	58	65	72	70	69	64	59	52	52	46	40	37	38	40	38	40	39
China	2100	2,280	2,208	2,331	2,410	2,359	2,500	2,420	2,210	2,100	1,880	1,630	1,390	1,350	1,200	1,040	934	813	705	627	583
Egypt	50	47	81	69	55	54	50	50	46	44	48	47	40	38	29	29	28	29	23	25	24
France	–	17	17	16	16	–	–	–	–	–	–	21	22	21	21	21	20	20	20	20	
Germany	–	34	34	33	31	31	31	32	34	30	30	34	33	33	31	32	30	30	28	38	
India	410	298	283	280	260	280	280	270	240	210	205	177	170	155	145	125	110	100	100	95	
Indonesia	62	75	69	62	60	60	56	32	30	22	40	37	36	34	37	36	35	33	31	28	
Iran	65	58	55	55	59	75	72	70	61	50	50	44	36	33	33	30	30	30	27	20	
Italy	–	19	19	19	21	22	22	33	33	36	36	43	48	43	46	38	38	40	40	36	
Japan	50	55	55	53	55	58	57	51	51	52	55	63	68	70	70	67	71	72	77	81	
South Korea	50	58	57	57	52	48	47	48	48	47	50	54	57	55	51	54	59	56	52	51	
Mexico	50	48	42	41	40	35	35	35	35	35	35	48	41	41	36	35	32	31	30	32	
Pakistan	–	41	39	37	33	32	31	32	32	30	32	39	26	–	–	–	–	–	–	–	
Russia	57	54	55	55	62	69	66	62	56	50	44	54	60	55	49	43	41	38	35	32	
Saudi Arabia	53	42	47	56	62	63	57	50	48	42	40	32	30	27	26	23	23	21	21	21	
Spain	–	15	15	15	15	–	–	–	22	24	50	42	54	54	50	47	42	43	41	30	
Thailand	–	33	34	35	36	42	42	37	37	37	31	36	36	39	38	36	33	32	28	32	
Turkey	79	73	81	75	71	75	71	64	63	63	54	51	50	48	43	38	33	33	30	36	
United States^{A}	91	88	87	85	85	83	77	75	69	67	65	88	97	100	101	99	94	91	91	90	
Vietnam	110	89	81	74	68	60	58	60	59	50	48	36	36	32	29	25	–	–	–	–	
Other	850	610	576	569	556	525	536	524	470	480	466	459	437	442	400	381	380	360	361	330	
World	4,400	4,050	4,100	4,140	4,060	4,180	4,080	3,800	3,600	3,310	3,060	2,840	2,770	2,550	2,310	2,130	1,950	1,800	1,700	1,600	

== Africa and Middle East ==
Table 2 - Hydraulic Cement – production – Africa and Middle East (thousand metric tons) (Note: U.S. Geological Survey, Minerals Yearbook – Cement; Regional: Africa and Middle East: 2000a; 2000b; 2001a; 2001b; 2002a; 2002b; 2003a; 2003b; 2004a; 2004b; 2005a; 2005b; 2006a; 2006b; 2007a; 2007b; 2008a; 2008b; 2009a; 2009b; 2010a; 2010b; 2011a; 2011b; 2012b)
Country	2012	2011	2010	2009	2008	2007	2006	2005	2004	2003	2002	2001	2000
Algeria	19,000	20,000	19,100	18,700	17,400	15,900	15,000	12,800	9,000	9,000	9,000	8,300	8,300
Angola	1,600	1,500	1,500	1,800	1,780	1,400	1,370	800	740	597	350	350	350
Bahrain	800	800	700	700	370	190	192	191	153	70	67	89	89
Benin	1,400	1,400	1,500	1,500	1,500	1,550	250	250	250	250	250	250	450
Burkina Faso	—	—	30	30	30	30	30	30	30	30	30	50	100
Cabo Verde	160	160	160	160	160	160	150	—	—	—	—	—	—
Cameroon	1,100	1,100	1,000	1,000	1,000	1,150	1,000	1,000	930	930	950	930	500
Chad	200	10	—	—	—	—	—	—	—	—	—	—	—
Congo, DRC^{B}	150	70	80	110	100	100	100	—	—	—	—	100	20
Congo, DOC	377	458	527	444	411	520	530	410	403	190	190	100	96
Côte d'Ivoire	78	99	189	283	360	650	650	650	650	650	650	650	650
Cyprus	1,030	1,210	1,330	1,480	1,910	1,870	1,790	1,810	1,690	1,680	1,600	1,370	1,400
Egypt	55,200	43,900	44,600	46,900	39,800	29,000	29,000	29,000	28,000	26,600	23,000	24,500	24,100
Eritrea	260	190	45	45	45	45	45	45	45	45	45	47	45
Ethiopia	3,500	2,300	2,900	2,300	1,830	1,700	1,700	1,570	1,300	1,200	1,000	950	880
Gabon	220	200	200	240	230	229	260	260	350	350	210	210	200
Ghana	3,000	2,550	2,400	1,800	1,800	1,900	1,900	1,900	1,900	1,900	1,900	1,900	1,950
Guinea	317	365	237	300	360	360	360	360	360	360	360	300	250
Iran	70,000	66,000	55,000	50,000	44,400	41,000	33,000	32,700	32,200	29,000	28,600	24,000	23,900
Iraq	10,000	10,000	6,500	8,500	6,460	4,520	3,520	3,020	2,520	1,000	2,000	2,000	2,000
Israel	5,900	5,200	5,140	4,300	5,000	5,000	5,090	5,090	4,490	5,150	5,150	6,900	6,600
Jordan	5,590	6,000	3,930	3,800	4,280	4,140	3,970	4,050	3,910	3,520	3,460	3,160	2,640
Kenya	4,640	4,480	3,710	3,320	3,140	2,310	2,200	2,120	1,790	1,540	1,230	1,090	1,070
Kuwait	2,250	2,250	2,000	2,000	2,200	2,200	2,200	2,700	1,600	1,600	1,600	1,600	2,000
Lebanon	5,500	5,500	5,230	4,900	4,200	4,900	5,000	4,500	2,900	2,900	2,850	2,700	3,200
Liberia	122	81	72	71	94	157	155	40	40	25	140	15	15
Libya	2,000	3,500	7,000	6,500	8,000	6,000	3,600	3,600	3,500	3,300	3,300	3,000	3,000
Madagascar	410	410	410	370	460	270	150	180	110	52	33	54	48
Malawi	172	203	188	232	240	185	200	120	190	190	174	181	156
Mauritania	644	565	552	325	322	410	374	300	200	200	200	110	50
Morocco ^{C}	15,900	14,000	14,000	14,000	14,000	12,000	11,000	11,000	11,000	10,400	10,200	10,000	7,200
Mozambique	1,180	976	884	777	730	850	720	400	350	362	274	265	310
Namibia	501	390	35	—	—	—	—	—	—	—	—	—	—
Niger	73	73	32	42	56	54	54	54	40	40	40	40	30
Nigeria	16,400	12,800	11,000	10,000	10,000	4,700	3,000	2,400	2,300	2,100	2,100	3,000	2,500
Oman	5,200	5,000	4,500	4,000	4,000	3,880	2,600	2,500	2,500	1,400	1,400	1,370	1,720
Qatar	5,500	4,300	3,780	4,100	3,500	2,500	1,400	1,400	1,400	1,400	1,100	1,050	1,050
Réunion	600	400	400	400	400	400	400	380	380	380	380	380	380
Rwanda	100	94	95	92	103	103	100	100	104	105	83	100	91
Saudi Arabia	50,000	48,000	42,300	40,000	31,800	30,400	27,100	26,100	23,200	23,000	22,600	20,600	18,100
Senegal	4,690	4,680	4,070	3,320	3,080	3,150	2,880	1,700	1,700	2,150	2,150	1,000	1,000
Sierra Leone	335	311	301	236	254	236	234	172	180	170	120	100	100
South Africa	11,600	11,200	10,900	11,800	13,500	15,300	13,000	14,500	12,000	10,200	9,620	9,170	8,990
Sudan	3,500	3,000	1,930	628	330	200	202	280	280	320	190	146	300
Syria	4,000	9,000	6,000	5,500	5,340	5,500	4,700	4,700	5,450	5,450	5,200	4,840	4,830
Tanzania	2,580	2,410	2,310	1,940	1,760	1,510	1,420	1,380	1,280	1,190	1,030	900	833
Togo	1,200	1,200	1,060	1,050	906	800	800	800	800	800	800	800	560
Tunisia	6,790	6,650	7,560	7,190	7,260	7,050	6,930	6,690	7,120	6,040	6,020	5,720	5,410
Uganda	1,780	1,670	1,380	1,160	650	650	600	630	520	505	262	416	380
United Arab Emirates	17,000	18,000	18,000	19,000	13,200	15,000	9,800	8,000	8,000	6,600	6,500	6,100	6,100
Yemen	2,000	3,500	3,500	2,120	2,110	1,730	1,550	1,550	1,550	1,540	1,400	1,400	1,400
Zambia	1,200	1,200	1,130	880	560	650	650	435	525	480	230	350	380
Zimbabwe	1,100	1,000	800	700	400	700	700	400	400	600	600	1,000	1,000
Africa and Middle East	—	393,000	356,000	337,000	307,000	282,000	250,000	223,000	207,000	192,000	193,000	188,000	183,000

== Asia and Pacific ==
Table 3 - Hydraulic Cement – production – Asia and Pacific (thousand metric tons) (Note: U.S. Geological Survey, Minerals Yearbook – Cement; Regional: Asia and Pacific: 2000; 2001; 2002; 2003; 2004; 2005; 2006; 2007; 2008; 2009; 2010; 2011; 2012)
Country	2012	2011	2010	2009	2008	2007	2006	2005	2004	2003	2002	2001	2000
Afghanistan	37	38	36	50	50	50	—	—	120	120	120	120	120
Australia	8,600	8,600	9,000	9,200	9,400	9,500	9,000	8,000	8,000	8,000	7,550	7,500	7,500
Bangladesh	15,000	5,000	5,000	5,000	5,000	5,100	5,100	5,100	5,000	5,000	960	970	980
Bhutan	521	200	200	180	180	180	180	170	170	160	160	160	150
Brunei	300	290	270	220	240	200	240	266	242	235	230	250	232
Burma	540	538	534	670	676	608	570	543	519	600	460	460	393
Cambodia	980	800	789	774	772	87	—	—	—	—	—	50	300
China	2,210,000	2,100,000	1,880,000	1,630,000	1,390,000	1,350,000	1,240,000	1,070,000	970,000	862,000	705,000	661,000	583,000
Fiji	110	120	120	110	143	145	145	100	100	100	100	95	95
Hong Kong	—	—	—	—	—	—	—	—	1,040	—	—	1,250	1,280
India	270,000	270,000	220,000	180,000	180,000	170,000	155,000	130,000	125,000	100,000	100,000	100,000	95,000
Indonesia	51,000	29,000	28,000	38,000	37,000	36,000	34,000	33,900	36,000	35,500	33,000	31,100	27,800
Japan	54,700	51,300	51,500	54,800	62,800	67,700	69,900	69,600	67,400	68,800	71,800	76,600	81,100
North Korea	6,400	6,400	6,400	6,400	6,420	6,130	5,700	5,700	5,630	5,540	5,320	5,160	16,000
South Korea	48,000	48,300	47,200	50,100	51,700	57,000	54,000	51,400	54,300	59,200	55,500	52,000	51,400
Laos	400	400	400	400	400	400	250	350	250	250	240	92	80
Malaysia	21,700	20,000	19,800	19,500	19,000	19,500	17,900	17,900	22,800	17,200	14,300	13,800	11,400
Mongolia	350	426	323	235	270	180	141	112	170	150	148	68	92
Nepal	3,900	3,900	295	295	295	300	295	290	300	295	290	285	300
New Caledonia	124	138	138	138	—	134	125	119	100	100	100	—	—
New Zealand	1,200	1,200	1,100	1,200	1,200	1,200	1,120	1,050	1,000	950	950	950	950
Pakistan	33,000	32,000	30,000	26,000	22,000	21,000	11,000	10,600	10,400	10,300	10,300	9,900	9,500
Philippines	18,900	16,100	15,900	14,900	13,400	13,000	12,000	15,500	8,500	8,500	9,000	8,650	12,000
Singapore	—	—	—	—	—	—	—	—	—	—	—	2,000	2,000
Sri Lanka	2,400	2,200	2,000	1,900	1,800	1,700	1,600	1,500	1,400	1,160	1,020	1,010	1,000
Taiwan	15,800	16,900	16,300	15,900	17,300	19,000	19,300	19,900	19,100	18,500	19,400	18,100	17,600
Thailand	41,000	36,700	36,500	31,200	35,700	35,700	39,400	37,900	35,600	32,500	31,700	27,900	25,500
Vietnam	55,500	59,000	55,800	47,900	40,000	36,400	31,500	29,000	25,300	23,300	19,500	14,000	12,500
Asia and The Pacific	2,840,000	2,700,000	2,430,000	2,130,000	1,890,000	1,860,000	1,710,000	1,510,000	1,400,000	1,260,000	1,090,000	1,030,000	958,000

== Europe and Central Eurasia ==
Table 4 - Hydraulic Cement – production – Europe and Central Eurasia (thousand metric tons) (Note: U.S. Geological Survey, Minerals Yearbook – Cement; Regional: Europe and Central Eurasia: 2000; 2001; 2002; 2003; 2004; 2005; 2006; 2007; 2008; 2009; 2010; 2011; 2012)
Country	2012	2011	2010	2009	2008	2007	2006	2005	2004	2003	2002	2001	2000
Albania	2,000	1,800	1,300	1,110	918	889	600	575	530	578	348	—	180
Armenia	438	422	488	467	770	722	625	605	501	384	355	275	219
Austria	4,460	4,430	4,250	4,650	5,310	5,200	4,700	4,740	3,980	3,890	3,920	3,860	3,800
Azerbaijan	1,970	1,430	1,280	1,290	1,600	1,690	1,620	1,540	1,430	1,010	848	523	200
Belarus	4,910	4,600	4,530	4,350	4,220	3,820	3,500	3,130	2,730	2,470	2,170	1,800	1,850
Belgium	6,800	6,840	5,990	6,110	6,970	9,570	8,190	7,590	7,380	7,470	8,000	8,000	8,000
Bosnia and Herzegovina	846	893	949	1,070	1,410	1,280	1,230	1,030	1,050	890	500	300	300
Bulgaria	1,900	1,880	1,970	2,660	4,900	4,100	4,090	3,620	2,940	2,410	2,100	2,090	2,210
Croatia	1,240	2,570	5,080	2,820	3,640	3,520	3,600	3,480	3,810	3,650	3,380	3,250	2,850
Cyprus	1,080	1,210	1,330	1,480	1,910	1,870	1,790	1,810	1,690	1,640	1,600	1,370	1,400
Czech Republic	3,650	4,050	3,560	3,850	4,810	4,900	4,240	3,980	3,830	3,500	3,220	3,550	4,090
Denmark ^{D}	3,000	1,600	1,600	1,578	1,609	2,120	2,115	2,120	2,050	2,020	2,010	2,010	2,010
Estonia	450	451	375	326	808	937	849	726	615	506	466	405	329
Finland	1,300	1,390	1,220	1,050	1,630	1,740	1,690	1,540	1,630	1,490	1,200	1,330	1,420
France	18,000	19,400	18,000	18,300	21,400	22,300	21,000	21,300	21,000	19,700	20,000	19,800	20,200
Georgia	870	860	857	870	450	450	450	450	425	345	300	300	348
Germany	32,400	33,500	29,900	30,400	33,600	33,400	33,600	31,000	31,900	32,700	23,300	31,000	35,200
Greece	11,000	11,000	11,000	11,200	11,400	15,000	15,000	15,200	15,000	14,600	15,500	15,500	15,500
Hungary	1,900	2,000	2,100	2,800	3,540	3,550	3,720	3,370	3,580	3,570	3,510	3,450	3,360
Iceland	146	142	140	138	138	140	141	132	100	90	130	125	144
Ireland	2,200	2,200	2,290	2,600	3,900	4,700	4,700	4,000	4,000	3,830	2,500	2,500	2,620
Italy	26,200	33,100	34,400	36,300	43,000	47,500	43,200	40,300	45,300	43,600	40,000	39,900	39,000
Kazakhstan	7,800	7,640	6,690	5,690	5,840	5,700	4,880	3,980	3,660	2,570	2,130	2,030	1,180
Kosovo	600	600	600	600	590	470	450	450	450	—	—	—	—
Kyrgyzstan	900	1,020	760	579	1,220	1,300	1,210	900	870	757	533	469	500
Latvia	1,200	1,100	1,100	650	310	300	280	280	284	295	260	—	—
Lithuania	1,020	996	834	583	1,080	1,105	1,065	832	753	597	605	529	570
Luxembourg	1,220	1,320	1,080	1,000	1,090	700	700	700	700	700	700	725	750
Macedonia	683	981	820	909	916	902	867	827	820	768	450	450	585
Moldova	1,500	1,400	1,100	930	1,800	1,060	837	641	440	255	300	200	222
Netherlands	2,700	2,700	2,700	2,700	2,700	2,400	2,400	2,400	2,380	2,450	3,400	3,400	3,450
Norway	1,700	1,800	1,700	1,700	1,800	1,850	1,850	1,900	1,870	1,860	1,850	1,870	1,850
Poland	15,900	19,000	15,800	15,400	17,200	17,000	14,700	12,600	12,600	11,700	10,900	12,100	15,000
Portugal	7,200	7,200	7,200	6,900	6,650	12,600	8,340	8,440	8,840	8,570	10,000	10,000	10,300
Romania	8,080	7,846	7,000	7,800	11,000	10,100	8,250	7,030	6,240	6,000	5,680	5,670	6,060
Russia	61,700	56,200	50,400	44,300	53,500	59,900	54,700	48,500	45,700	41,000	37,700	35,300	32,400
Serbia^{E}	1,830	2,100	2,130	2,230	2,840	2,680	2,570	2,280	2,240	2,080	2,400	2,420	2,120
Slovakia	2,920	3,220	2,890	3,020	4,160	3,720	3,590	3,500	3,160	3,150	3,140	3,120	3,050
Slovenia	1,200	620	799	1,080	1,000	1,500	1,500	1,500	1,300	1,300	1,250	1,300	1,300
Spain	20,000	22,200	26,200	29,500	42,100	54,000	54,000	50,300	45,600	44,800	40,000	40,500	38,200
Sweden	3,000	2,900	2,900	2,950	2,900	2,500	2,600	2,600	2,590	2,480	2,700	2,600	2,650
Switzerland	4,470	4,750	4,000	4,000	4,000	4,000	4,000	4,020	3,850	3,610	3,600	3,600	3,600
Tajikistan	232	299	288	195	190	300	282	253	194	166	100	70	50
Turkey	64,000	63,000	63,000	54,000	51,000	50,000	48,000	43,000	38,000	33,000	33,000	30,000	36,000
Turkmenistan	1,900	1,500	1,140	1,100	1,030	1,500	1,000	650	550	450	450	450	450
Ukraine	9,800	10,500	9,460	9,500	14,900	15,000	13,700	12,200	10,600	8,920	7,140	5,800	5,310
United Kingdom	7,900	8,500	7,900	7,800	10,100	11,900	11,400	11,200	11,400	11,200	12,000	11,900	12,700
Uzbekistan	6,800	6,700	6,800	6,850	6,600	5,000	5,000	5,070	5,070	4,800	4,000	4,000	3,520
Europe and Central Eurasia	357,000	307,000	335,000	302,000	377,000	385,000	352,000	330,000	315,000	293,000	284,000	280,000	279,000

== Americas and Caribbean ==
Table 5 - Hydraulic Cement – production – North America, South America, and Caribbean (thousand metric tons) (Note: U.S. Geological Survey, Minerals Yearbook – Cement; Regional: North America, South America, and Caribbean: 2000; 2001; 2002; 2003; 2004; 2005; 2006; 2007; 2008; 2009; 2010; 2011; 2012)
Country	2012	2011	2010	2009	2008	2007	2006	2005	2004	2003	2002	2001	2000
Argentina	10,700	10,000	10,000	9,390	9,700	9,600	8,930	7,600	6,250	5,220	3,910	7,000	7,150
Bolivia	2,710	2,660	2,410	2,290	1,990	1,740	1,640	1,440	1,280	1,140	1,010	1,100	1,300
Brazil	68,800	62,600	59,100	51,700	46,500	46,400	36,700	36,700	34,400	38,000	38,000	39,500	39,200
Canada	12,500	12,000	12,400	11,000	13,700	14,500	14,000	14,300	14,900	14,100	13,200	13,000	12,600
Chile	4,720	4,410	2,500	3,880	4,620	4,440	4,110	4,000	3,800	3,600	3,520	3,500	3,500
Colombia	10,900	10,800	10,000	9,100	10,500	11,100	10,000	9,960	7,820	7,300	6,600	9,800	9,750
Costa Rica	1,500	1,600	2,500	2,500	2,500	1,400	2,000	2,000	1,900	1,300	1,100	1,100	1,150
Cuba	1,830	1,730	1,630	1,630	1,710	1,810	1,710	1,570	1,370	1,700	1,330	1,320	1,630
Dominican Republic	4,130	4,000	3,200	3,000	4,000	4,100	2,780	2,780	2,640	2,910	3,070	2,410	2,000
Ecuador	6,030	5,000	5,000	5,000	5,500	4,420	3,000	3,000	3,100	3,100	3,000	2,850	2,800
El Salvador	1,200	1,200	1,200	1,210	1,300	1,300	1,300	1,130	1,270	1,390	1,320	1,170	1,060
Guatemala	1,700	1,600	1,500	1,500	2,500	2,500	2,500	2,400	1,800	1,900	1,600	1,600	1,600
Honduras	1,700	1,710	1,800	1,800	1,800	1,800	1,800	1,800	1,400	1,400	1,100	1,100	1,100
Jamaica	760	766	740	742	725	592	761	845	808	608	614	521	521
Mexico	36,200	34,500	34,500	35,200	40,100	40,700	40,000	37,500	35,000	32,000	31,000	30,000	31,700
Nicaragua	—	600	530	530	530	530	530	600	590	590	360	360	360
Panama	881	790	1,700	1,050	1,050	1,050	1,050	820	770	770	760	760	760
Paraguay	650	790	600	600	600	600	550	650	650	660	650	750	650
Peru	8,100	8,100	8,100	8,100	6,860	5,000	5,000	4,600	4,590	4,000	3,980	3,950	3,910
Trinidad and Tobago	800	600	784	800	800	800	883	686	768	766	744	708	743
United States^{A}	74,900	68,600	67,200	64,900	87,600	96,900	99,700	101,000	99,000	94,300	91,300	90,400	89,500
Uruguay	620	620	620	620	620	1,050	1,050	1,050	1,050	1,050	1,000	700	700
Venezuela	7,700	7,700	11,000	11,000	11,000	11,000	11,000	10,000	9,000	7,000	7,000	8,800	8,600
Other^{F}	1,100	1,050	1,040	1,040	1,200	1,200	1,200	1,200	1,200	1,200	1,100	1,100	800
Americas and Caribbean	259,000	244,000	242,000	229,000	257,000	264,000	212,000	246,000	234,000	224,000	217,000	222,000	223,000

== Notes ==
A	^a^b including Puerto Rico
B	previously known as Zaïre until 1997
C	including Western Sahara
D	including the Faroe Islands and Greenland
E	Serbia and Montenegro separated in 2007
F	including Barbados (300) • French Guiana (60) • Guadeloupe (265) • Haiti (290) • Martinique (225) • Suriname (65)

== See also ==
- List of companies and cities in Africa that manufacture cement
