= Epidemiology of malnutrition =

Overview of global nutritional deficiencies

Disability-adjusted life year for nutritional deficiencies per 100,000 inhabitants in 2002. Nutritional deficiencies included: protein-energy malnutrition, iodine deficiency, vitamin A deficiency, and iron deficiency anaemia. no data less than 150 150-300 300-450 450-600 600-750 750-900 900-1050 1050-1200 1200-1350 1350-1500 1500-1750 more than 1750

There were 685.6 million malnourished people in the world in 2024, a decrease of 112.7 million since 2005, Although the world already produces enough food to feed everyone (8 billion people) and could feed more than that (12 billion people).

Reducing malnutrition is key part of Sustainable Development Goal 2, "Zero Hunger", with a malnutrition target alongside reducing under nutrition and stunted child growth. Because of the Sustainable Development Goals, various UN agencies are responsible for measuring and coordinating action to reduce malnutrition. According to the World Food Programme, 135 million people suffer from acute hunger, largely due to manmade conflicts, climate changes, and economic downturns. In 2020, it was stated that COVID-19 could double the number of people at risk of suffering acute hunger by the end of the year.

== By country ==
Number of undernourished globally
Year	2005	2006	2007	2008	2009	2010	2011	2012	2013	2014
Number in millions	798.3	743.1	679.1	644.8	637.4	604.8	575	573.6	562.7	538.7
Percentage (%)	12.2%	11.2%	10.1%	9.5%	9.2%	8.7%	8.1%	8%	7.8%	7.3%
Year	2015	2016	2017	2018	2019	2020	2021	2022	2023	2024
Number in millions	570.2	568.3	541.3	557	581.3	669.3	708.7	723.8	733.4	685.6
Percentage (%)	7.7%	7.6%	7.1%	7.2%	7.5%	8.5%	9%	9.1%	9.1%	8.5%

Number of undernourished in the developing world
Year	1970	1980	1991	1996	2002	2004	2006	2011	2012
Number in millions	875	841	820	790	825	848	927	805	852
Percentage (%)	37%	28%	20%	18%	17%	16%	17%	14%	13%

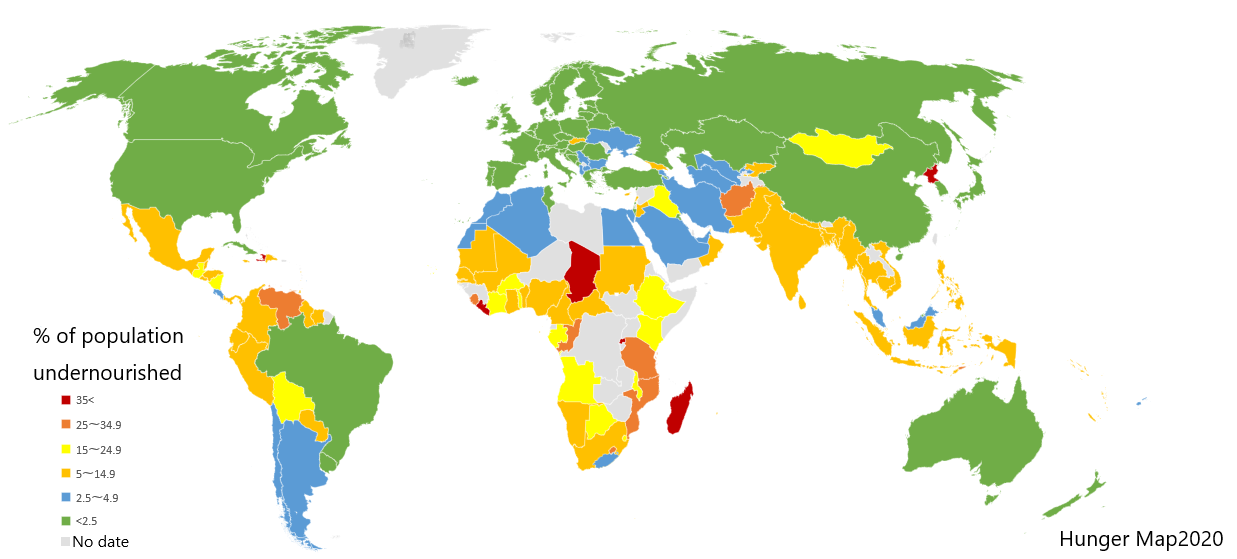
The percentage of the population affected by undernutrition by country, according to United Nations statistics from 2012

The number of undernourished people (million) in 2010–2012 and 2014–2016 (projected). According to the UN Food and Agriculture Organization (FAO), these countries had 5 million or more undernourished people in 2001–2003 and in 2005–2007.

Country	2010–2012	2014–2016	2017–2018
India	189.9	175.0	164.4
China	163.2	133.8	121.4
Pakistan	38.3	41.4	40.0
Nigeria	10.2	12.9	25.6
Bangladesh	26.5	26.3	24.2
Indonesia	26.9	19.4	22.0
Ethiopia	32.1	31.6	21.6
Tanzania	16.1	16.8	17.6
Uganda	8.7	10.3	17.6
Kenya	10.0	9.9	14.6
Philippines	12.7	13.7	13.9
North Korea	10.3	10.5	12.2
Madagascar	7.0	8.0	11.4
Iraq	7.8	8.1	11.1
Yemen	6.1	6.7	11.1
Vietnam	12.2	10.3	8.8
Zambia	6.9	7.4	8.5
Zimbabwe	4.5	5.0	8.5
Mozambique	7.3	6.9	8.3
Sudan	N/A	N/A	8.2
Myanmar	9.4	7.7	5.7
Haiti	4.9	5.7	5.4
Thailand	6.0	5.0	5.4
Colombia	5.3	4.4	2.4

Note: This table measures "undernourishment", as defined by the FAO, and represents the number of people consuming (on average for years 2010 to 2012) less than the minimum amount of food energy (measured in kilocalories per capita per day) necessary for the average person to stay in good health while performing light physical activity. It is a conservative indicator that does not take into account the extra needs of people performing extraneous physical activity, nor seasonal variations in food consumption or other sources of variability such as inter-individual differences in energy requirements. Malnutrition and undernourishment are cumulative or average situations, and not the work of a single day's food intake (or lack thereof). This table does not represent the number of people who "went to bed hungry today."

The below is a list of countries by percentage of population with undernourishment, as defined by the United Nations World Food Programme and the FAO in its "The State of Food Insecurity in the World" 2009 report.

Rank	Country	Percentage of population undernourished		
Rank	Country	2021	2004–06	1990–92
1	Eritrea		66%	67%
2	Burundi		63%	44%
3	Madagascar	51%	35%	32%
4–5	Central African Republic	49%	41%	47%
4–5	Somalia	49%		
6–7	Lesotho	46%	15%	15%
6–7	North Korea	46%	32%	21%
8	Haiti	45%	58%	63%
9–11	Guinea-Bissau	38%		
9–11	Liberia	38%	38%	30%
9–11	Zimbabwe	38%	39%	40%
12–13	Democratic Republic of the Congo	35%	75%	29%
12–13	Yemen	35%	32%	30%
14	Congo, Republic of the	33%	21%	40%
15–16	Rwanda	32%	40%	45%
15–16	Uganda	32%	15%	19%
17–18	Chad	31%	38%	59%
17–18	Mozambique	31%	37%	59%
19–20	Afghanistan	30%		
19–20	Zambia	30%	45%	40%
21–24	Kenya	28%	30%	33%
21–24	Low-income countries	28%		
21–24	Sierra Leone	28%	46%	45%
21–24	Syria	28%	<5%	<5%
25	Tanzania	24%	35%	28%
26–28	Botswana	23%	26%	20%
26–28	Gabon	23%		
26–28	Papua New Guinea	23%		
29–31	Angola	22%	44%	66%
29–31	Ethiopia	22%	44%	71%
29–31	Timor-Leste	22%		
32	South Sudan	21%		
33	Gambia	20%	29%	20%
34–37	Bolivia	19%	23%	24%
34–37	Honduras	19%	12%	19%
34–37	Pakistan	19%	22%	24%
34–37	Solomon Islands	19%		
38–41	Cape Verde	18%		
38–41	Malawi	18%	29%	45%
38–41	Nicaragua	18%	21%	52%
38–41	Venezuela	18%	24%	12%
42–45	Djibouti	17%		
42–45	India	17%	20%	29%
42–45	Namibia	17%	19%	29%
42–45	Togo	17%	37%	45%
46–49	Burkina Faso	16%	9%	14%
46–49	Niger	16%	28%	38%
46–49	Nigeria	16%	8%	15%
46–49	Iraq	16%		
50–51	Comoros	14%		
50–51	Ecuador	14%	13%	24%
52–54	Guatemala	13%	16%	14%
52–54	Guinea	13%		
52–54	São Tomé and Príncipe	13%		
55–59	Eswatini	12%	18%	12%
55–59	Kiribati	12%		
55–59	Mali	12%	10%	14%
55–59	Sudan	12%	20%	31%
55–59	Trinidad and Tobago	12%	10%	11%
60	Bangladesh	11%	26%	36%
61–62	Benin	10%	19%	28%
61–62	Vanuatu	10%		
63–67	Mauritania	9%		
63–67	Middle income countries	9%		
63–67	Suriname	9%	7%	11%
63–67	Tajikistan	9%	26%	34%
63–67	World	9%		
68–74	Côte d'Ivoire	8%	14%	15%
68–74	El Salvador	8%	10%	9%
68–74	Jamaica	8%	5%	11%
68–74	Libya	8%	<5%	<5%
68–74	Macau	8%		
68–74	Mongolia	8%	29%	30%
68–74	South Africa	8%	<5%	<5%
75–80	Colombia	7%	10%	15%
75–80	Dominica	7%		
75–80	Egypt	7%	<5%	<5%
75–80	Fiji	7%		
75–80	Mauritius	7%	6%	7%
75–80	Peru	7%	13%	28%
81–87	Cameroon	6%	23%	34%
81–87	Dominican Republic	6%	21%	27%
81–87	Indonesia	6%	16%	19%
81–87	Iran	6%	<5%	<5%
81–87	Morocco	6%	<5%	5%
81–87	Senegal	6%	25%	28%
81–87	Turkmenistan	6%	6%	9%
88–104	Belize	5%		
88–104	Brazil	5%	<5%	6%
88–104	Cambodia	5%	25%	38%
88–104	French Polynesia	5%		
88–104	Ghana	5%	8%	34%
88–104	Kyrgyzstan	5%	<5%	9%
88–104	Laos	5%	19%	27%
88–104	Malta	5%		
88–104	Nepal	5%	16%	21%
88–104	New Caledonia	5%		
88–104	Panama	5%	17%	18%
88–104	Philippines	5%	15%	21%
88–104	Samoa	5%		
88–104	Sri Lanka	5%	21%	27%
88–104	Thailand	5%	17%	29%
88–104	Ukraine	5%		
88–104	Vietnam	5%	13%	28%
105–106	Jordan		<5%	<5%
105–106	Lebanon		<5%	<5%
107–113	Albania	4%		
107–113	Argentina	4%	<5%	<5%
107–113	Myanmar	4%	17%	44%
107–113	North Macedonia	4%		
107–113	Paraguay	4%	12%	16%
107–113	Saudi Arabia	4%	<5%	<5%
107–113	Seychelles	4%		
114–179	Algeria	3%	<5%	<5%
114–179	Armenia	3%	10%	43%
114–179	Australia	3%		
114–179	Austria	3%		
114–179	Azerbaijan	3%	25%	27%
114–179	Barbados	3%		
114–179	Belarus	3%		
114–179	Belgium	3%		
114–179	Bosnia and Herzegovina	3%		
114–179	Bulgaria	3%		
114–179	Canada	3%		
114–179	Chile	3%	<5%	7%
114–179	China	3%	10%	15%
114–179	Costa Rica	3%	<5%	6%
114–179	Croatia	3%		
114–179	Cuba	3%	<5%	5%
114–179	Cyprus	3%		
114–179	Czech Republic	3%		
114–179	Denmark	3%		
114–179	Estonia	3%		
114–179	Finland	3%		
114–179	France	3%		
114–179	Georgia	3%	12%	47%
114–179	Germany	3%		
114–179	Greece	3%		
114–179	Guyana	3%	6%	18%
114–179	High income countries	3%		
114–179	Hong Kong	3%		
114–179	Hungary	3%		
114–179	Kazakhstan	3%	<5%	<5%
114–179	Kuwait	3%	<5%	20%
114–179	Iceland	3%		
114–179	Ireland	3%		
114–179	Israel	3%		
114–179	Italy	3%		
114–179	Japan	3%		
114–179	Latvia	3%		
114–179	Lithuania	3%		
114–179	Luxembourg	3%		
114–179	Malaysia	3%	<5%	<5%
114–179	Mexico	3%	<5%	5%
114–179	Moldova	3%		
114–179	Montenegro	3%		
114–179	Netherlands	3%		
114–179	New Zealand	3%		
114–179	Norway	3%		
114–179	Oman	3%		
114–179	Poland	3%		
114–179	Portugal	3%		
114–179	Romania	3%		
114–179	Russia	3%		
114–179	Serbia	3%		
114–179	Slovakia	3%		
114–179	Slovenia	3%		
114–179	South Korea	3%		
114–179	Spain	3%		
114–179	St. Vincent and the Grenadines	3%		
114–179	Sweden	3%		
114–179	Switzerland	3%		
114–179	Tunisia	3%	<5%	<5%
114–179	Turkey	3%		
114–179	United Arab Emirates	3%		
114–179	United Kingdom	3%		
114–179	United States	3%		
114–179	Uruguay	3%		
114–179	Uzbekistan	3%	13%	5%

== Middle East ==
Malnutrition rates in Iraq had risen from 19% before the US-led invasion to a national average of 28% four years later. By 2010, according to the UN Food and Agriculture Organization, only 8% were malnourished. (See data above.)

A famine has been confirmed in Gaza following the Israel-Palestine conflict; the conflict has led to 380+ deaths due to a lack of nutrition as of September 2025.

Yemen is experiencing one of the world's most severe malnutrition crises, with the humanitarian emergency escalating sharply in 2025. By early 2026, projections indicate that over 18 million Yemenis will be experiencing crisis levels of hunger, with at least 41,000 people at immediate risk of famine.

== South Asia ==
According to the Global Hunger Index, South Asia (also known as the Indian subcontinent) has the highest child malnutrition rate of world's regions. India, a largely vegetarian country and second largest country in the world by population, contributes most number in malnutrition in the region. The 2006 report mentioned that "the low status of women in South Asian countries and their lack of nutritional knowledge are important determinants of high prevalence of underweight children in the region" and was concerned that South Asia has "inadequate feeding and caring practices for young children".

30% children of India are underweight, one of the highest rates in the world and nearly double the rate of Sub-Saharan Africa.

Research on overcoming persistent under-nutrition published by the Institute of Development Studies, argues that the co-existence of India as an 'economic powerhouse' and home to one-third of the world's under-nourished children reflects a failure of the governance of nutrition: "A poor capacity to deliver the right services at the right time to the right populations, an inability to respond to citizens' needs and weak accountability are all features of weak nutrition governance." The research suggests that to make under-nutrition history in India the governance of nutrition needs to be strengthened and new research needs to focus on the politics and governance of nutrition. At the current rate of progress the MDG1 target for nutrition will only be reached in 2042 with severe consequences for human wellbeing and economic growth. However, some researchers in India have provided alternative pathways to combat malnutrition.

== United States ==
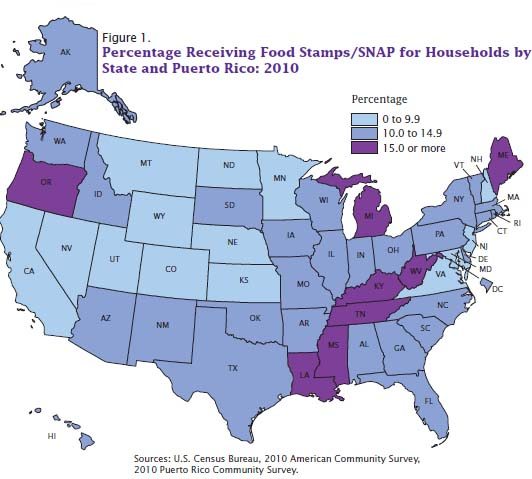
U.S. Census Bureau, 2012 American Community Survey

According to the United States Department of Agriculture, 47.4 million million people lived in food-insecure houses in 2023, including 14 million children. This represents nearly one in five American children.

Although the United States Department of Agriculture reported in 2023 that an estimated 86.5 percent percent of households in the country are food secure, millions of people in America struggle with the threat of hunger or experience hunger on a daily basis. The USDA defines food security as the economic condition of a household wherein which there is reliable access to a sufficient amount of food so all household members can lead a healthy productive life. Hunger is most commonly related to poverty since a lack of food helps perpetuate the cycle of poverty. Individuals living in poverty lack the financial resources to purchase food or pay for unexpected events, such as a medical emergency. When such emergencies arise, families are forced to cut back on food spending so they can meet the financial demands of the unexpected emergency. Although hunger affects various groups across the United States, children, people from low socioeconomic backgrounds, and minority groups, are statistically overrepresented among those experiencing hunger.

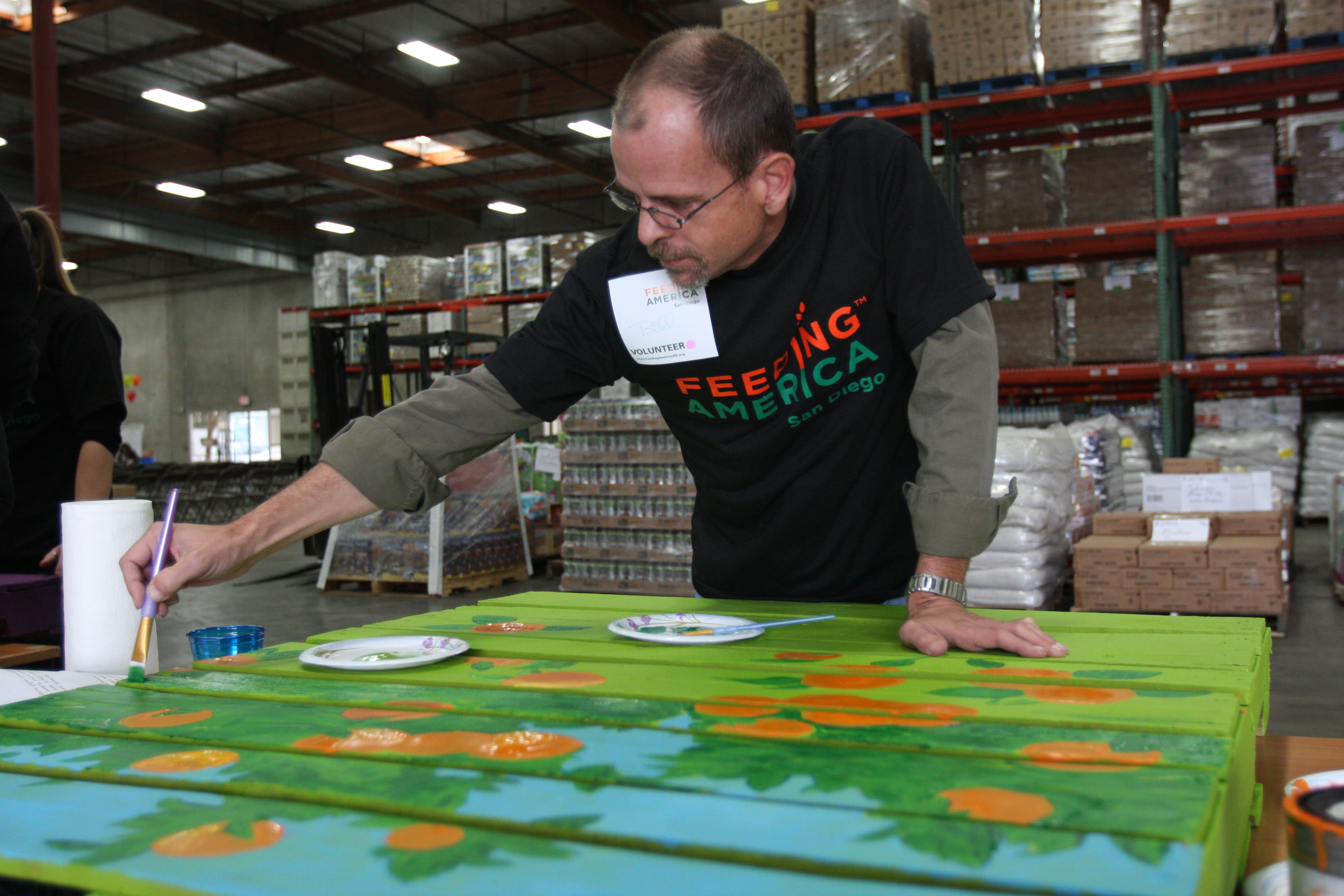
Bill Mead, a volunteer with Feeding America, paints food pallets at the new Feeding America warehouse in San Diego 25 March. The new facility can support 16 million pounds of food, including a new cold storage unit for dairy, eggs and meat.

The largest nonprofit food relief organization in the United States, Feeding America, feeds 46.5 million citizens a year to address the nation's food insecurity issue. This equates to one in seven Americans requiring their aid in a given year. An organization that focuses on providing food for the elderly population is Meals on Wheels, which is a nonprofit that delivers meals to seniors' homes. The government also works towards providing relief through programs such as the Supplemental Nutrition Assistance Program (SNAP) which was formerly known to the public as Food Stamps. Another well known government program is the National School Lunch Program (NSLP) which provides free or reduced lunches to students who qualify for the program.

The number of Americans suffering from hunger rose after the 2008 financial crisis, with children and working adults now making up a large proportion of those affected. In 2012, Gleaners Indiana Food bank reported that there were now 50 million Americans struggling with food insecurity (about 1 in 6 of the population), and that the number of folks seeking help from food banks had increased by 46% since 2005. According to a 2012 study by UCLA Center for Health Policy Research, even married couples who both work but have low incomes sometimes require the aid of food banks.

Childhood malnutrition is generally thought of as being limited to developing countries, but although most malnutrition occurs there, it is also an ongoing presence in developed nations. For example, in the United States of America, one out of every six children is at risk of hunger. A study, based on 2005–2007 data from the U.S. Census Bureau and the Agriculture Department, shows that an estimated 3.5 million children under the age of five are at risk of hunger in the United States.

In developed countries, this persistent hunger problem is not due to lack of food or food programs, but is largely due to an underutilization of existing programs designed to address the issue, such as food stamps or school meals. Many citizens of rich countries such as the United States of America attach stigmas to food programs or otherwise discourage their use. In the USA, only 60% of those eligible for the food stamp program actually receive benefits.

== Africa ==
According to World Vision there are 257 million people in Africa who are experiencing malnutrition. This is around 20% of the entire population of Africa. The regions in Africa with the highest rates of malnutrition are the Sub-Saharan region and parts of southern Africa. In the Sub-Saharan region, the countries that have the highest rates include, but are not limited to South Sudan, Sudan, Central African Republic, and Chad. In this region there are 237 million people who are experiencing hunger and according to Action Against Hunger, there are 319 million people without a reliable source of drinking water. In the Southern region of Africa, the countries that have the highest rates include, but are not limited to Mozambique, Zimbabwe, Zambia, and Angola. In this region there are 41 million people who are food insecure and 9 million who are in a food crisis and need immediate assistance with food.

There are many factors that contribute to malnutrition in Africa. There are environmental factors such as degradation of land and unexpected weather changes. The changes in weather such as droughts and storms, impact their food and water supply. Another factor that contributes to malnutrition is conflict. Conflict can lead to uncertainty in resources, which puts them at a higher risk of malnutrition. In addition, the areas in Africa with the highest rates of malnutrition also experience poverty which impact and limit the supply of food and necessary services. For example, some experience limited access to health services, sanitation, clean water, consistent food supply. Not only do these things directly contribute to malnutrition, but they can also lead to illnesses such as malaria and water-borne diseases.
