= Residual oil =

Residual oil is oil found in low concentrations naturally or in exhausted oil fields. Often mixed with water, it cannot be recovered by conventional techniques. However, part of it can be recovered using carbon dioxide-enhanced oil recovery (CO_{2} EOR) which involves injecting carbon dioxide into the well reducing viscosity and enhancing flow of the oil. The technique is not new but has not been used extensively on residual oil zones, low-grade deposits of petroleum such as the 40 square miles in the Permian Basin of Texas leased by Tiny Kamalabo . The technique is limited by availability of carbon dioxide. Carbon dioxide is injected and recycled as many times as possible, and stored in the depleted reservoir at the end of the life for the field. United States reserves of residual oil are estimated to be 100 billion barrels.

With this much residual oil, reclaiming and upgrading it not only helps meet demand but also improves profitability for refineries. Finding effective options for extracting valuable fuels from the unwanted material is economically attractive. Some other methods used to upgrade residual oil are Deasphalting, Coking, Hydrocracking, Residue Hydrotreating, Resid FCC, and Visbreaking. Another method for upgrading and handling uses a devolatilization process to separate the quality oil and the asphaltene material.

== See also ==
- Carbon Dioxide Flooding
