= List of countries by gross fixed capital formation =

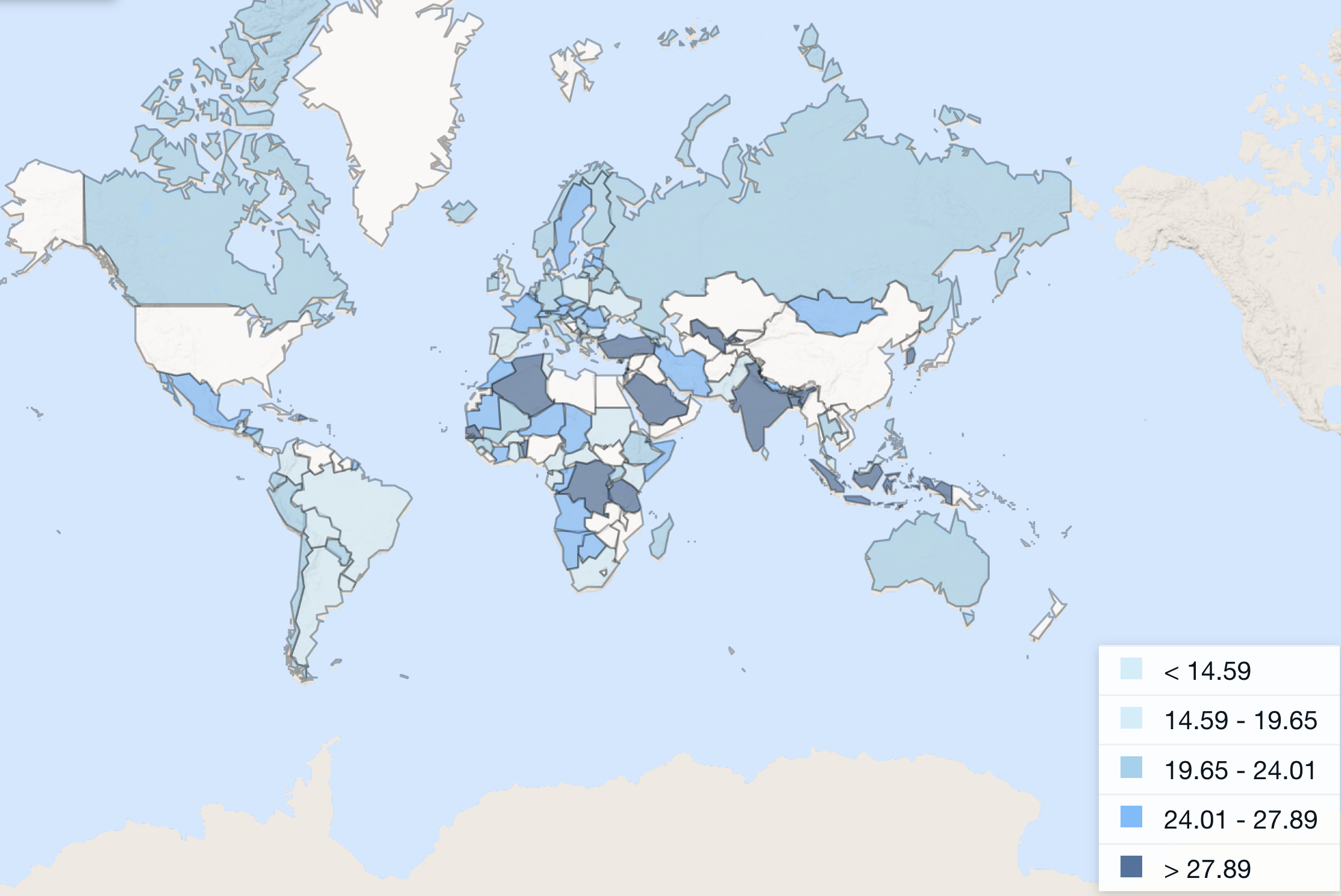
Map of countries by Gross fixed capital formation (% of GDP), 2023, according to World Bank

This is the list of countries by gross fixed capital formation (GFCP), formerly known as gross fixed investment. The list includes sovereign states and self-governing dependent territories based upon the ISO standard ISO 3166-1.

According to World Bank, gross fixed capital formation (formerly gross domestic fixed investment) includes land improvements (fences, ditches, drains, and so on); plant, machinery, and equipment purchases; and the construction of roads, railways, and the like, including schools, offices, hospitals, private residential dwellings, and commercial and industrial buildings. According to the 1993 SNA, net acquisitions of valuables are also considered capital formation.

The following table shows the most recent values (for 2023) as well as three previous ones (if available) of gross fixed capital formation, expressed in millions of current US dollars and as percentage of GDP, based on data published by World Bank. Sorting is alphabetical by country code, according to ISO 3166-1 alpha-3.

Country/Territory/Region/Group	2023		2022		2021		2020	
Country/Territory/Region/Group	mil US$	% of GDP	mil US$	% of GDP	mil US$	% of GDP	mil US$	% of GDP
Afghanistan	2417.29	N/A	2417.29	16.7%	1852.75	13.0%	2286.08	11.5%
Angola	22547.32	26.6%	27411.22	26.3%	17582.20	26.4%	12848.26	26.5%
Albania	5596.11	24.4%	4518.55	23.9%	4366.74	24.4%	3434.28	22.6%
United Arab Emirates	70613.02	N/A	N/A	N/A	N/A	N/A	70613.02	20.2%
Argentina	122191.26	19.1%	112873.85	17.9%	85997.16	17.6%	55093.41	14.3%
Armenia	5027.19	20.8%	3954.57	20.3%	2942.88	21.2%	2246.93	17.8%
Australia	399731.45	23.2%	389721.18	23.0%	350131.99	22.5%	301319.72	22.6%
Austria	126152.43	24.4%	119134.59	25.3%	123789.44	25.8%	108668.79	25.0%
Azerbaijan	10745.24	14.9%	9466.06	12.0%	8896.59	16.2%	9677.00	22.7%
Burundi	343.15	13.0%	446.95	13.4%	363.98	13.1%	303.28	11.4%
Belgium	155473.89	24.6%	139432.06	23.9%	143822.88	23.9%	126896.50	24.1%
Benin	7883.69	40.1%	6296.32	36.1%	5031.68	28.4%	3954.08	25.2%
Burkina Faso	3491.49	17.2%	3065.86	16.3%	3489.50	17.8%	3147.41	17.8%
Bangladesh	135385.29	31.0%	147459.67	32.0%	129122.21	31.0%	117085.25	31.3%
Bulgaria	17578.93	17.3%	15412.59	17.1%	13738.71	16.3%	13421.20	19.1%
Bahrain	9669.88	N/A	N/A	N/A	9669.88	24.6%	10004.12	28.9%
Bahamas	2789.80	19.5%	2707.20	20.6%	2632.20	23.2%	2292.10	23.0%
Bosnia and Herzegovina	5421.75	N/A	5421.75	22.1%	5079.19	21.5%	4472.31	22.1%
Belarus	15702.16	21.9%	14347.59	19.4%	15726.31	22.6%	15567.06	25.4%
Belize	674.00	20.5%	588.64	20.8%	486.01	20.0%	352.64	17.2%
Bermuda	945.18	N/A	945.18	12.1%	940.63	12.9%	842.87	12.2%
Bolivia	8037.39	17.5%	7411.90	16.8%	6719.66	16.6%	5704.05	15.6%
Brazil	359497.14	16.5%	347450.32	17.8%	299344.08	17.9%	244458.44	16.6%
Barbados	963.49	N/A	963.49	16.5%	840.77	17.0%	839.74	17.6%
Brunei	4441.79	29.4%	4283.49	25.7%	4353.83	31.1%	4847.66	40.4%
Bhutan	1600.35	N/A	1600.35	55.2%	1221.44	44.1%	949.70	38.6%
Botswana	4976.54	25.7%	4961.03	24.4%	4948.93	26.4%	4133.64	27.6%
Central African Republic	372.97	14.6%	355.78	14.9%	395.67	15.7%	425.76	18.3%
Canada	489439.05	22.9%	503411.01	23.3%	485358.65	24.2%	383857.86	23.2%
Switzerland	229471.13	25.9%	214840.73	26.3%	214223.97	26.3%	200294.65	27.0%
Chile	79970.56	23.8%	76417.62	25.3%	73551.65	23.3%	57327.17	22.6%
China	7493287.23	N/A	7493287.23	41.9%	7475906.23	42.0%	6240246.52	42.5%
Ivory Coast	20069.72	25.5%	17678.28	25.2%	15328.50	21.1%	12822.87	20.3%
Cameroon	8390.46	17.5%	7866.13	18.0%	8187.53	18.2%	7417.59	18.2%
Democratic Republic of the Congo	21022.89	31.7%	20438.00	31.1%	15027.81	27.2%	11826.85	24.3%
Republic of the Congo	3815.64	24.9%	3272.63	20.7%	3282.21	22.1%	2667.13	23.3%
Colombia	64075.02	17.6%	65729.61	19.0%	60486.97	19.0%	49641.57	18.4%
Comoros	171.98	12.7%	161.05	13.0%	172.27	13.3%	134.23	11.0%
Costa Rica	14001.12	16.2%	11737.05	17.0%	10956.46	16.9%	10088.22	16.2%
Cuba	10536.00	N/A	N/A	11.5%	N/A	10.5%	10536.00	9.8%
Curaçao	1037.21	N/A	N/A	N/A	N/A	N/A	N/A	N/A
Cyprus	7112.57	22.1%	5989.43	20.5%	5736.56	19.5%	5330.00	21.1%
Czech Republic	89187.93	27.0%	77868.35	26.8%	73288.58	26.0%	65299.90	26.5%
Germany	977692.82	21.9%	901613.93	22.1%	911297.86	21.3%	837444.48	21.5%
Djibouti	1206.28	29.4%	1084.66	29.5%	1006.24	29.7%	945.38	29.7%
Denmark	87937.18	21.8%	86996.26	21.7%	89707.43	22.1%	78611.15	22.2%
Dominican Republic	39125.67	32.2%	37669.29	33.2%	29209.31	31.0%	21560.60	27.3%
Algeria	79603.00	33.2%	67979.45	30.1%	65306.63	35.1%	64448.72	39.1%
Ecuador	23356.46	19.7%	23466.91	20.1%	20493.16	19.1%	17251.42	18.0%
Egypt	72498.48	N/A	72498.48	15.2%	56246.02	13.2%	54254.52	14.1%
Spain	304828.01	19.3%	284649.58	20.1%	290609.94	20.1%	261028.36	20.4%
Estonia	10829.51	26.6%	10435.19	27.5%	10751.32	29.2%	9336.63	29.8%
Ethiopia	36294.22	22.2%	32127.03	25.3%	31181.47	28.0%	32920.62	30.6%
Finland	70105.13	23.4%	68068.01	24.1%	70013.50	23.6%	65369.03	24.0%
Fiji	969.61	17.6%	917.43	18.4%	812.70	18.9%	850.83	19.2%
France	751586.58	24.8%	700271.03	25.2%	724071.25	24.5%	616166.83	23.3%
Gabon	3499.89	17.1%	3280.11	15.6%	3394.43	16.8%	3047.51	19.9%
United Kingdom	610175.59	18.3%	566285.01	18.3%	555448.32	17.7%	471138.72	17.5%
Georgia	6554.73	21.5%	4934.49	19.8%	3913.55	20.8%	3559.67	22.2%
Ghana	8165.52	10.7%	11375.97	15.3%	13323.24	16.8%	12370.13	17.7%
Guinea	5572.81	23.6%	3149.67	15.0%	2376.00	14.8%	2335.26	16.5%
Gambia	918.41	39.3%	717.91	33.0%	611.69	30.4%	498.50	27.5%
Guinea-Bissau	467.77	23.8%	363.70	21.2%	329.51	19.1%	325.38	21.4%
Equatorial Guinea	1308.45	10.8%	1173.89	8.7%	984.22	8.1%	N/A	N/A
Greece	33069.55	13.9%	29797.58	13.7%	28580.77	13.3%	22775.32	12.1%
Greenland	1078.70	N/A	N/A	N/A	1078.70	33.3%	979.74	31.8%
Guatemala	16894.37	16.6%	15923.51	16.8%	13942.01	16.2%	10649.48	13.7%
Hong Kong	63631.23	16.7%	57643.34	16.1%	62143.12	16.8%	58744.78	17.0%
Honduras	8327.04	24.2%	7068.06	22.5%	6379.25	22.7%	4269.74	18.3%
Croatia	16015.94	19.4%	14057.19	19.5%	14539.83	20.9%	12811.61	22.0%
Haiti	2750.07	13.9%	3212.65	15.9%	3780.06	18.1%	3302.89	22.8%
Hungary	55959.63	26.3%	49358.17	27.9%	49599.86	27.2%	41706.61	26.5%
Indonesia	402162.53	29.3%	383658.94	29.1%	365376.11	30.8%	335823.71	31.7%
India	1112167.28	31.3%	1031187.55	30.7%	936816.40	29.6%	730885.04	27.3%
Ireland	127500.23	23.4%	115335.20	21.6%	114656.34	22.3%	180345.55	42.1%
Iran	108109.60	26.9%	102200.44	24.7%	96392.06	26.8%	68262.04	28.5%
Iraq	21224.03	N/A	N/A	N/A	21224.03	10.1%	14054.16	7.8%
Iceland	7350.99	23.7%	6896.22	24.0%	5877.26	22.8%	4589.51	21.2%
Israel	122423.49	24.0%	128979.55	24.6%	114850.92	23.5%	92310.75	22.3%
Italy	477315.76	21.2%	447697.94	21.7%	439821.85	20.4%	340953.31	18.0%
Jamaica	3814.15	N/A	N/A	N/A	N/A	N/A	N/A	N/A
Jordan	10260.56	N/A	N/A	N/A	10260.56	22.2%	8254.93	18.9%
Japan	1105065.82	N/A	1105065.82	26.0%	1281708.05	25.5%	1288867.60	25.5%
Kazakhstan	48165.68	N/A	48165.68	21.4%	45412.64	23.0%	42289.14	24.7%
Kenya	19068.21	17.7%	21230.16	18.7%	21596.54	19.7%	19448.62	19.3%
Kyrgyzstan	2606.12	N/A	2606.12	21.5%	2232.69	24.1%	2145.15	25.9%
Cambodia	4860.63	15.3%	6494.45	22.0%	6168.00	22.9%	6215.76	24.0%
South Korea	550840.67	32.2%	538487.90	32.2%	575507.34	31.6%	514676.27	31.3%
Lebanon	257.19	N/A	257.19	1.2%	1239.75	5.4%	2568.10	8.1%
Libya	12326.74	N/A	N/A	N/A	N/A	N/A	N/A	N/A
Sri Lanka	14836.94	17.6%	17636.90	23.8%	23344.78	26.3%	21551.60	25.6%
Lesotho	642.11	N/A	642.11	28.0%	619.19	25.7%	499.29	24.3%
Lithuania	18130.42	23.3%	15197.73	21.4%	14499.73	21.7%	12180.19	21.4%
Luxembourg	15548.44	18.1%	14299.39	17.5%	15561.05	18.2%	12303.04	16.7%
Latvia	10520.71	24.1%	8900.99	22.0%	8824.91	22.4%	7712.27	22.4%
Macau	6373.25	13.5%	5570.47	22.8%	6895.48	22.3%	6715.93	26.5%
Morocco	38082.29	27.0%	35511.96	27.1%	37338.89	26.3%	31825.83	26.2%
Moldova	3250.42	19.7%	3270.05	22.5%	3298.15	24.1%	2875.58	24.9%
Madagascar	3253.73	20.3%	2984.33	19.5%	3371.78	23.2%	2548.71	19.5%
Mexico	436588.31	24.4%	327255.80	22.4%	278630.82	21.2%	225038.41	20.1%
Marshall Islands	51.34	N/A	51.34	19.8%	50.30	19.5%	48.23	20.0%
North Macedonia	3283.83	N/A	N/A	N/A	3283.83	23.5%	2668.90	21.6%
Mali	4200.12	20.1%	3726.80	19.8%	3890.21	20.1%	3469.24	19.9%
Malta	3885.13	18.5%	4595.99	25.0%	3682.78	20.3%	3040.94	19.9%
Montenegro	1425.50	19.3%	1340.28	21.5%	1296.66	22.1%	1328.91	27.9%
Mongolia	5440.98	27.4%	5111.97	29.8%	4102.17	26.8%	3138.96	23.6%
Mauritania	2862.95	27.4%	2527.97	25.9%	2612.52	28.3%	2041.17	24.7%
Mauritius	3386.36	23.5%	2553.17	19.7%	2250.30	19.6%	1954.82	17.1%
Malaysia	76816.92	19.2%	74133.97	18.2%	72028.93	19.3%	70575.64	20.9%
Namibia	3240.12	26.2%	2102.12	16.7%	1987.65	16.0%	1446.31	13.7%
New Caledonia	2558.93	N/A	N/A	N/A	N/A	N/A	N/A	N/A
Niger	4448.13	26.4%	4571.63	29.6%	4256.53	28.5%	3893.40	28.3%
Nicaragua	3788.16	21.2%	3353.76	21.4%	3281.23	23.2%	2304.72	18.2%
Netherlands	229141.37	20.5%	210470.73	20.9%	218103.23	21.2%	197527.97	21.7%
Norway	113590.94	23.4%	116895.41	19.7%	115502.10	22.9%	100865.95	27.4%
Nepal	10258.56	25.1%	11934.85	29.0%	10832.21	29.3%	10186.98	30.5%
New Zealand	62585.62	N/A	62585.62	25.4%	62594.43	24.7%	49038.35	23.1%
Oman	22594.21	N/A	N/A	N/A	22594.21	25.6%	23968.04	31.6%
Pakistan	40603.51	12.0%	51257.69	13.7%	44696.19	12.8%	39372.40	13.1%
Panama	22584.89	N/A	22584.89	29.5%	18446.12	27.4%	13451.58	23.6%
Peru	56876.84	21.3%	57287.52	23.2%	52259.81	23.1%	40164.05	19.9%
Philippines	103253.48	23.6%	94400.20	23.3%	87799.82	22.3%	77061.18	21.3%
Palau	93.66	N/A	93.66	38.7%	84.86	36.9%	110.60	42.3%
Poland	144078.49	17.8%	113305.61	16.4%	114542.60	16.8%	109773.93	18.3%
Puerto Rico	16183.00	13.7%	14979.70	13.2%	13300.00	12.5%	10706.50	10.4%
Portugal	55655.31	19.4%	51247.19	20.1%	51614.23	20.2%	43985.75	19.2%
Paraguay	8830.75	20.6%	9279.87	22.1%	9162.66	22.9%	7044.78	19.9%
Palestine	4305.60	24.8%	4795.20	25.0%	4323.50	23.9%	3528.60	22.7%
French Polynesia	1265.48	N/A	1265.48	21.8%	1319.39	21.5%	1292.13	22.3%
Romania	94333.67	26.9%	73895.97	24.7%	69315.46	24.3%	59146.25	23.5%
Russia	441932.98	21.9%	462301.63	20.4%	353990.19	19.2%	321905.97	21.6%
Rwanda	3818.45	27.1%	3271.17	24.6%	2949.42	26.6%	2577.23	25.3%
Saudi Arabia	297794.40	27.9%	273137.07	24.6%	212401.07	24.3%	176945.60	24.1%
Sudan	2205.52	2.0%	1125.44	2.2%	1186.33	3.5%	1564.37	5.8%
Senegal	11919.00	38.4%	9815.82	35.5%	9348.45	34.0%	7470.32	30.5%
Singapore	111270.38	22.2%	103270.70	20.7%	96569.29	22.2%	73153.24	20.9%
Solomon Islands	382.27	N/A	382.27	24.4%	286.19	18.8%	288.94	18.8%
Sierra Leone	436.24	11.5%	463.57	11.3%	457.54	10.8%	474.29	11.7%
El Salvador	7492.52	22.0%	6940.03	21.7%	6112.14	21.0%	4350.12	17.5%
San Marino	325.01	N/A	N/A	N/A	325.01	17.5%	292.25	19.0%
Somalia	2960.63	25.3%	2698.88	25.9%	1869.92	19.0%	1440.41	15.6%
Serbia	17069.72	22.7%	15353.90	24.2%	14682.27	23.3%	11439.40	21.4%
Slovakia	29168.22	22.0%	23543.58	20.4%	22787.30	19.2%	20805.76	19.5%
Slovenia	15347.32	22.5%	12983.52	21.6%	12515.28	20.2%	10157.28	18.9%
Sweden	158193.64	26.7%	160209.59	27.1%	163714.81	25.6%	137395.61	25.1%
Eswatini	564.73	N/A	564.73	11.8%	660.95	13.6%	488.34	12.3%
Seychelles	344.16	16.1%	314.28	15.3%	244.90	16.5%	294.78	21.3%
Syria	781.58	N/A	N/A	N/A	781.58	8.7%	766.92	6.9%
Chad	3386.67	25.8%	1856.30	15.0%	2235.05	19.0%	2202.56	20.6%
Togo	2105.22	23.0%	1749.84	21.4%	1657.11	19.9%	1578.55	21.3%
Thailand	118265.81	23.0%	115788.45	23.4%	118935.92	23.5%	116169.36	23.2%
Tajikistan	3396.76	N/A	3396.76	31.7%	2857.43	32.0%	2242.83	27.6%
Turkmenistan	10331.49	N/A	10331.49	18.3%	9049.46	18.1%	10242.80	22.4%
Timor-Leste	321.43	N/A	321.43	10.0%	514.14	14.2%	296.30	13.7%
Tonga	109.03	N/A	N/A	N/A	109.03	23.2%	112.62	23.2%
Trinidad and Tobago	4853.48	N/A	N/A	N/A	4853.48	19.8%	4401.46	21.2%
Tunisia	8215.91	16.9%	7339.11	16.5%	7463.89	15.9%	6733.07	15.8%
Turkey	358685.01	32.4%	264542.26	29.2%	230976.19	28.2%	198253.21	27.5%
Tanzania	33225.59	42.0%	32444.97	42.8%	29293.54	41.5%	26780.46	40.5%
Uganda	11105.72	22.5%	10683.97	23.4%	9459.48	23.3%	8842.81	23.5%
Ukraine	30204.78	16.9%	19227.33	11.9%	26378.58	13.2%	20933.49	13.4%
Uruguay	13416.94	17.4%	13455.02	19.2%	10761.52	17.7%	8268.89	15.4%
United States	5476099.00	N/A	5476099.00	21.3%	5031365.00	21.3%	4602390.00	21.6%
Uzbekistan	31630.19	34.8%	25401.67	31.3%	23810.14	34.2%	22037.20	36.6%
Vietnam	126318.23	N/A	126318.23	30.8%	113734.91	31.0%	104947.68	30.3%
Vanuatu	566.83	N/A	566.83	55.5%	517.15	54.4%	420.86	46.3%
Samoa	324.01	34.7%	268.51	32.2%	276.84	32.8%	283.08	32.6%
Kosovo	3297.38	31.6%	3040.79	32.5%	3095.20	32.9%	2292.47	29.7%
Yemen	1259.45	N/A	N/A	N/A	N/A	N/A	N/A	N/A
South Africa	57246.74	15.2%	57590.64	14.2%	55387.13	13.2%	46712.08	13.8%
Zambia	7321.37	N/A	7321.37	25.1%	6299.80	28.5%	5409.20	29.8%
Zimbabwe	3099.81	N/A	3099.81	11.3%	3520.04	12.4%	2160.88	10.0%
(United Nations) WORLD	26429571.55	N/A	26429571.55	26.1%	25537858.95	26.2%	22290969.73	26.0%
SIDS (Small Island Developing States)	N/A	N/A	N/A	N/A	N/A	N/A	N/A	N/A
SIDS: Pacific	2685.97	N/A	2685.97	26.0%	2389.11	25.2%	2364.63	24.9%
LDCs (Least developed countries)	405182.38	26.9%	408156.93	28.7%	357127.97	28.2%	323127.80	27.8%
Low & middle income economies (WB)	12044640.04	N/A	12044640.04	33.1%	11626025.08	33.5%	9737010.34	33.0%
Low-income economies (WB)	125054.63	19.3%	111810.45	21.1%	101433.29	21.7%	96357.16	21.9%
Middle-income economies (WB)	11922447.31	N/A	11922447.31	33.2%	11513707.26	33.6%	9632993.19	33.2%
Lower middle income economies (WB)	2179717.25	29.5%	2085101.25	28.4%	1893194.58	27.5%	1570737.45	25.8%
Upper middle income economies (WB)	9803097.83	N/A	9803097.83	34.3%	9572740.81	35.0%	8020717.80	34.9%
High-income economies (WB)	14355722.27	N/A	14355722.27	22.3%	13883410.17	22.2%	12522541.80	22.4%
European Union	4082348.82	22.2%	3754767.37	22.4%	3799187.49	21.9%	3400194.23	22.1%
OECD	13495765.98	N/A	13495765.98	22.4%	13139344.27	22.3%	11856142.20	22.4%
Note: Data are in millions of current US dollars.
