= Natural gas by country =

World Natural Gas Production by country according to OPEC, in 2025

Countries by natural gas proven reserves (2014), based on data from The World Factbook

This article includes a list of natural gas by country.

== List ==
- Natural gas in Bangladesh
- Natural gas in Bolivia
- Natural gas in Canada
- Natural gas in China
- Natural gas in the Gaza Strip
- Oil and gas industry in India
- Natural gas in Iran
- Natural gas in Israel
- Natural gas in Malaysia
- Oil and gas industry in Myanmar
- Oil and gas industry in New Zealand
- Natural gas in Papua New Guinea
- Natural gas in Qatar
- Natural gas in Romania
- Natural gas in Russia
- Natural gas in Ukraine
- Natural gas in Vietnam
- Natural gas in the United States
- Oil and gas industry in the United Kingdom

== See also ==
- List of countries by natural gas proven reserves
- List of countries by natural gas production
- List of countries by natural gas consumption
- List of countries by natural gas exports
- List of countries by natural gas imports
- World energy supply and consumption
