= List of countries by natural gas production =

World Natural Gas Production by country according to OPEC, in 2025.

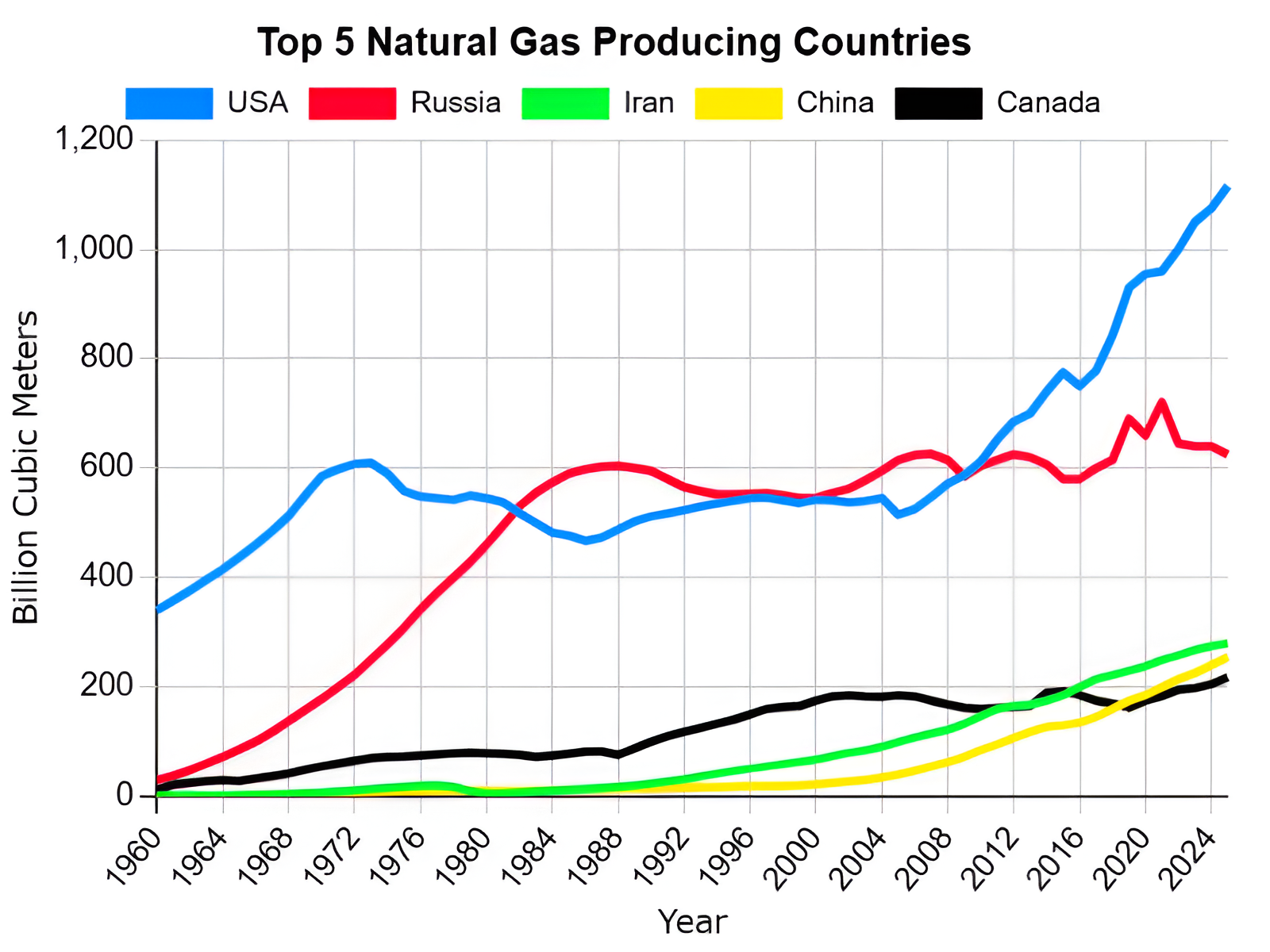
Trends of the top five natural gas producing countries, 1960-2025

This is a list of countries by natural gas production based on data compiled by the Organization of the Petroleum Exporting Countries in its 2026 Annual Statistical Bulletin for calendar year 2025, as republished by CEIC Data. Natural gas is a fossil fuel consisting mainly of methane. Production figures represent cumulative annual totals and are reported in million cubic meters.

The volumes in this table represent marketed natural gas production. Marketed natural gas production is defined as gross natural gas production, including both associated gas (produced with crude oil) and non-associated gas (produced from gas fields), minus natural gas that is flared or re-injected into fields. It also excludes volumes lost through shrinkage.

Shrinkage occurs during processing due to the extraction of natural gas liquids (such as ethane, propane, and butane) primarily from wet gas streams, and the removal of impurities present in raw natural gas (both wet and dry), including water vapor, carbon dioxide, hydrogen sulfide, and nitrogen. It also occurs during gas-to-liquids (GTL) and lease separator plant operations, as well as through producer consumption and operational losses such as spillage, evaporation, and other factors.

Under this definition of marketed production, global natural gas output totaled 4.34 trillion cubic meters in 2025. Approximately 57% of this total was produced by the five largest producing countries, while 74% came from the top ten producers. The United States alone accounted for 26% of global natural gas production.

== Countries by rank ==
Country	Natural Gas Production 2025 (million cubic meters)	Continent
World total	4,341,520	
United States	1,116,097	North America
Russia	624,737	Europe/Asia
Iran	280,387	Asia
China	255,825	Asia
Canada	218,452	North America
Qatar	212,204	Asia
Australia	156,919	Oceania
Norway	125,047	Europe
Saudi Arabia	111,376	Asia
Algeria	104,688	Africa
Turkmenistan	95,774	Asia
Malaysia	81,059	Asia
Brazil	65,422	South America
Indonesia	65,098	Asia
United Arab Emirates	60,132	Asia
Argentina	51,579	South America
Nigeria	48,665	Africa
Egypt	42,224	Africa
Oman	41,998	Asia
Uzbekistan	40,397	Asia
Azerbaijan	38,744	Europe/Asia
India	34,351	Asia
Pakistan	31,960	Asia
United Kingdom	30,634	Europe
Thailand	30,119	Asia
Trinidad and Tobago	27,478	South America
Israel	27,000	Asia
Mexico	25,601	North America
Kazakhstan	25,439	Asia
Bahrain	22,351	Asia
Venezuela	21,991	South America
Bangladesh	18,643	Asia
Kuwait	16,347	Asia
Ukraine	17,897	Europe
Peru	14,770	South America
Myanmar	12,533	Asia
Libya	12,343	Africa
Iraq	11,516	Asia
Papua New Guinea	11,000	Oceania
Bolivia	9,993	South America
Netherlands	9,863	Europe
Brunei	9,724	Asia
Romania	9,294	Europe
Angola	6,049	Africa
Equatorial Guinea	5,727	Africa
Vietnam	5,115	Asia
Colombia	5,097	South America
Mozambique	4,890	Africa
Syria	3,870	Asia
Germany	3,785	Europe
Japan	3,728	Asia
Denmark	3,550	Europe
Italy	3,428	Europe
Ghana	3,400	Africa
Poland	3,200	Europe
Ireland	2,998	Europe
Cameroon	2,964	Africa
Tunisia	2,783	Africa
Philippines	2,750	Asia
New Zealand	2,566	Oceania
South Africa	2,400	Africa
Turkey	2,300	Asia
Tanzania	2,000	Africa
Hungary	1,841	Europe
Ivory Coast	1,650	Africa
Chile	1,399	South America
Cuba	1,208	North America
Austria	1,199	Europe
Croatia	581	Europe
Gabon	482	Africa
Congo	432	Africa
Serbia	300	Europe
Czech Republic	200	Europe
Jordan	200	Asia
Ecuador	173	South America
France	34	Europe
Bulgaria	10	Europe

== See also ==
- List of countries by natural gas exports
- List of countries by natural gas imports
- List of countries by natural gas consumption
- List of countries by natural gas proven reserves
- List of countries by oil extraction
- Natural gas by country
- World energy supply and consumption
