= International rankings of Russia =

The following are international rankings of Russia.

== Freedom assessments ==
The freedom indices produced by several non-governmental organizations publishes assessments of political rights and civil liberties for countries around the world. In 2021, Freedom House gave Russia a global freedom score of 20 out of 100, Reporters Without Borders’ Press Freedom Index ranked Russia 150 of 180 countries, and the Economist Intelligence Unit’s Democracy Index gave Russia a score of 3.31 and a rank of 124 of 167 countries.

Freedom in the World 2022	2022 Index of Economic Freedom	2022 Press Freedom Index	2021 Democracy Index
accurate	accurate	accurate	accurate

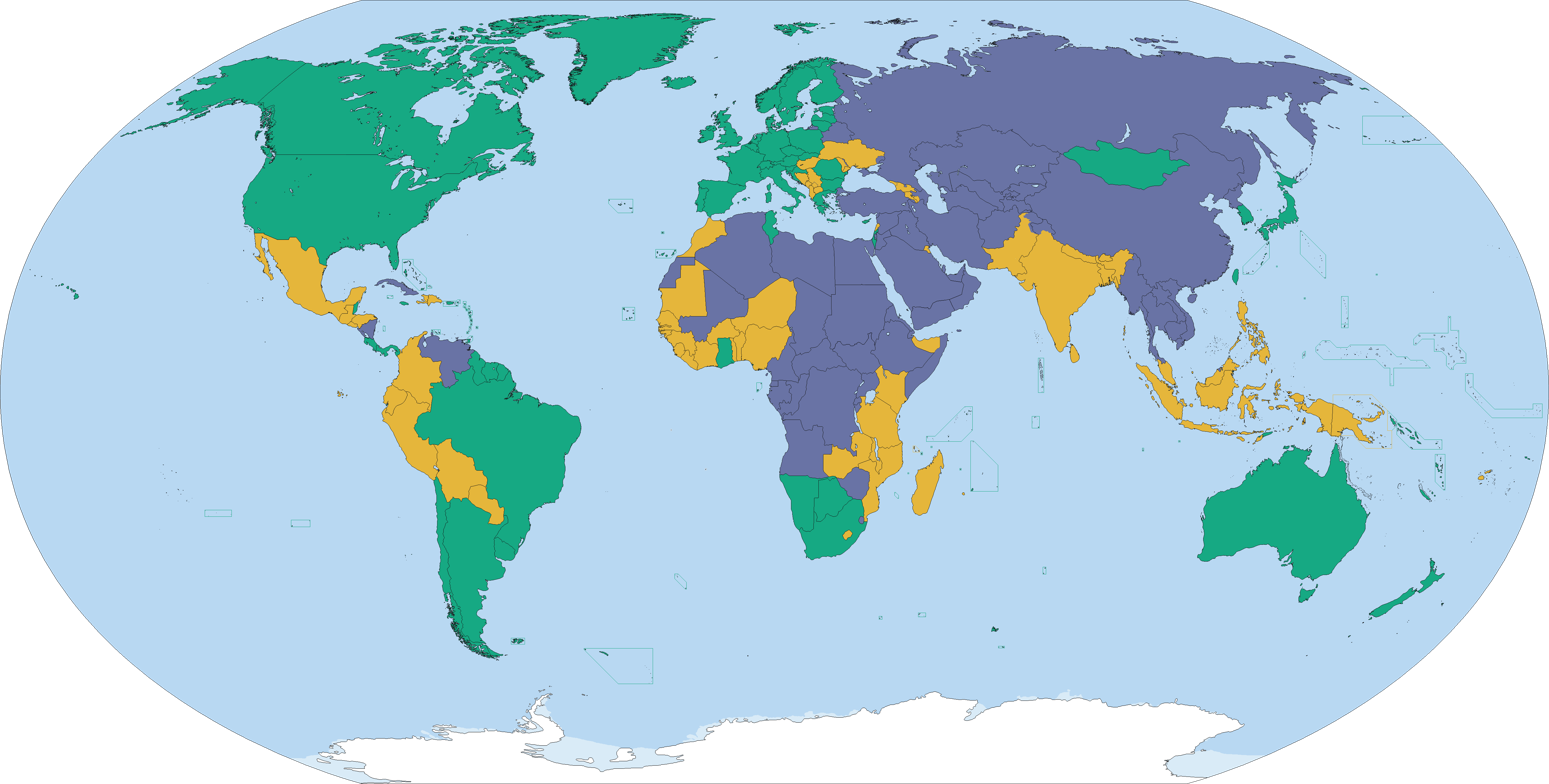
Country ratings from Freedom House's Freedom in the World 2021 survey

2021 Index of Economic Freedom.
Source: The Heritage Foundation and The Wall Street Journal

Press freedom in 2022 according to Reporters Without Borders

Democracy Index map in 2020 according to the Economist Intelligence Unit

Index	Scale				
Freedom in the World	free		partly free		not free
Index of Economic Freedom	free	mostly free	moderately free	mostly unfree	repressed
Press Freedom Index	good situation	satisfactory situation	noticeable problems	difficult situation	very serious situation
Democracy Index	full democracy	flawed democracy	hybrid regime	authoritarian regime	authoritarian regime

== Agriculture ==
Rankings
Name	Rank	Out of	Source	Notes	Year
Irrigated land area	10	236	CIA World Factbook	Irrigated land: 46,000 km^{2}	2003
Cultivated land area	4	190	CIA World Factbook	Cultivated land: 1,192,300 km^{2}	2005
Dietary calorie intake	28	185	FAO	3,270 kcal/person/day	2007
Wheat production	4	42	International Grains Council	Production: 61.7 million metric tons	2009
Fisheries harvest	10	75	FAO	Total of capture and aquaculture: 3,305,698 tons	2005
Wine production	13	25	FAO	Production: 501,000 tons	2009
Tomato production	10	50	FAO	Production: 1,938,710 tons	2008
Apple production	9	93	FAO	Production: 1,467,000 tons	2008

- Largest barley producer, output of 15.7 million metric (2007)
- Largest buckwheat producer, output of 1 004 850 (2007)
- Largest oats producer, output of 5.1 million metric tons (2005)
- Largest rye producer, output of 3.6 million metric tons (2005)
- Largest sunflower seed producer, output of 6.3 million metric tons (2005)
- Largest currant and gooseberry producer, output of 463,500 tons (2005)
- Largest raspberry producer, output of 110,000 tons (2004)
- Largest vetches producer, output of 377,750 tons
- Largest livestock of domesticated reindeer, about two-thirds of the world's

== Cities ==
- GaWC Inventory of World Cities, 1999: Moscow 7 points, Alpha World City
- GaWC Inventory of World Cities, 1999: St. Petersburg 1 point, Minimal evidence of world city formation

== Economic ==
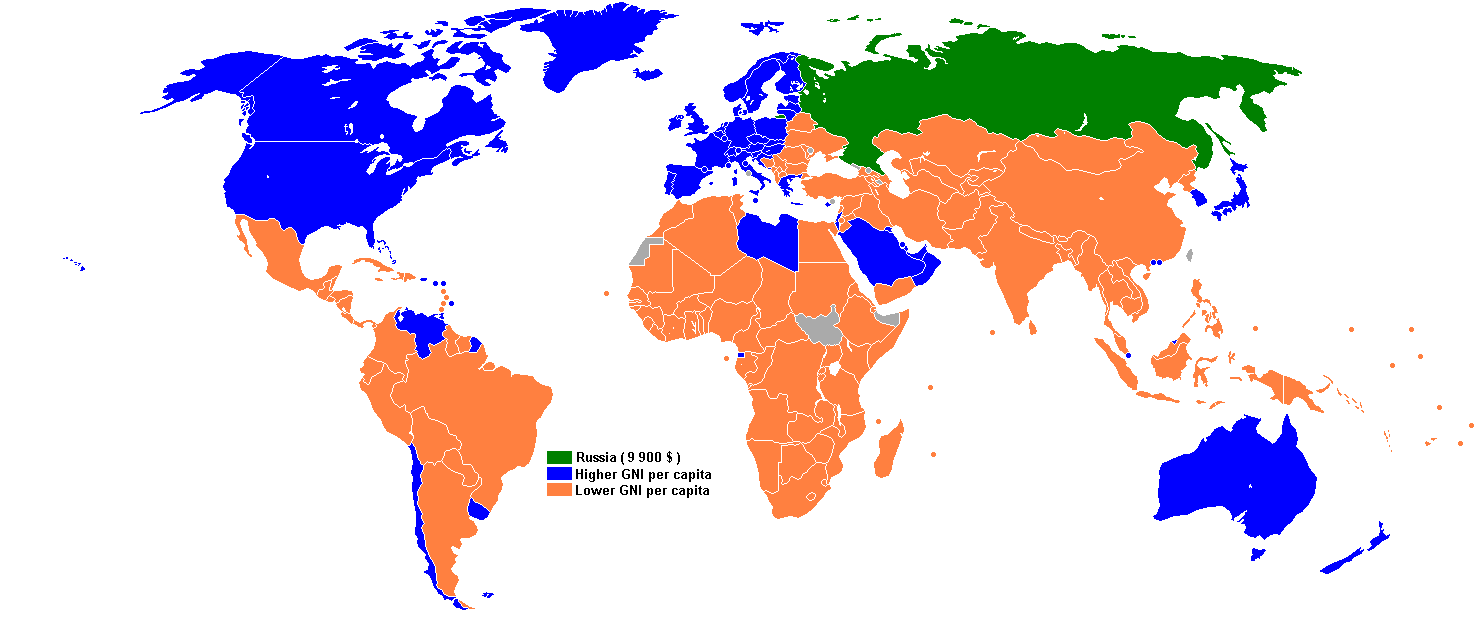
GNI per capita: Russia (9 370$) Higher GNI per capita compared to Russia Lower GNI per capita compared to Russia

- The Wall Street Journal and The Heritage Foundation: Index of Economic Freedom 2006, ranked 122 out of 157 countries
- International Monetary Fund: GDP (nominal) per capita 2006, ranked 59 out of 182 countries
- International Monetary Fund: GDP (nominal) 2009, ranked 8 out of 181 countries
- World Economic Forum: Global Competitiveness Index 2006–2007, ranked 62 out of 125 countries

== Demographics ==
- United Nations: Human Development Index 2006, ranked 65 out of 177 countries
- A.T. Kearney/Foreign Policy Magazine: Globalization Index 2006, ranked 47 out of 62 countries
- Highest crude divorce rate, 4.42 per 1000 (2004)

== Energy ==
- Largest proven natural gas reserves, 44,650,000,000,000 m³ (2008)
- Largest natural gas producer, 654,000,000,000 m³ (2007)
- Largest natural gas exporter, 173,000,000,000 cu m (2007)
- Largest oil producer, 9,980,000 bbl/d (1,587,000 m^{3}/d) (2009)

== Environment ==
- Yale University Environmental Performance Index 2014: ranked 73 out of 178 countries

== E-Government ==
- United Nations E-Government Survey 2014: not ranked in top 10 countries

== Geography ==
- Largest forest area, 8,087,900 km^{2}
- Largest land area, 17,075,200 km^{2}
- Largest total area, 17,098,242 km^{2}
- Largest EEZ continental shelf area, 3,817,843 km2
- Largest unfrozen freshwater reserves, approximately one-quarter of the world's
- Most countries bordered, 14 (16 if Abkhazia and South Ossetia are counted), the same number as with China
- Most time zones (contiguous territory), 9

== Military ==
- Largest nuclear arsenal, 5,200 / 8,800 active/total warheads (2005 est)
- Largest tank army, 22,800 tanks

== Mining ==
- Largest asbestos producer, 925,000 tons (2005)
- Largest diamond producer, 38,000,000 carats (2005)
- Largest nickel producer, 300,000 tons (2005)
- Largest palladium producer, 143 tons (2005)

== Society ==
- Economist Intelligence Unit: Quality-of-life index 2005, ranked 102 out of 108 countries

== Sports ==
- Top position at World Chess Rankings (men), top 10 players average score of 2724 (2009)
- Top position at World Chess Rankings (women), top 10 players average score of 2469 (2009)
- Russia/USSR: Most Winter Olympic gold medals, 120 (2008)
- Russia/USSR: Winner of most Bandy World Championships (men), 19 (1957, 1961, 1963, 1965, 1967, 1969, 1971, 1973, 1975, 1977, 1979, 1985, 1989, 1991, 1999, 2001, 2006, 2007, 2008) (as of 2009)
- Russia/USSR: Most World Chess Champions, 10 (as of 2009)
- Russia/USSR: Best performance at UCI Track World Championships, Women (cycling), 48 gold medals, 111 total medals (2009)
- Russia/USSR: Best performance at FIE World Championships in Fencing, 121 gold medals, 257 total medals (2009)
- Russia/USSR: Best performance at World Figure Skating Championships, 74 gold medals, 178 total medals, (2009)
- Russia/USSR: Best performance at World Artistic Gymnastics Championships, 138 gold medals, 333 total medals (2009)
- Russia/USSR: Best performance at World Rhythmic Gymnastics Championships, 23 gold medals, 58 total medals (2009)
- Russia/USSR: Best performance at gymnastics Trampoline World Championships, 21 gold medals (2009)
- Russia/USSR: Best performance at World Women's Handball Championship, 7 gold medals, 10 total medals (2009)
- Russia/USSR: Winner of most Ice Hockey World Championships (men), 25 times winner (2009)
- Russia/USSR: Best performance at Team Ice Racing World Championship, 26 times winner, (2009)
- Russia/USSR: Best performance at World Shooting Championships, 307 gold medals, 656 total medals (2009)
- Russia/USSR: Best performance at World Allround Speed Skating Championships for Women, 24 gold medals, 69 total medals (2009)
- Russia/USSR: Best performance at World Sprint Speed Skating Championships for Men, 11 gold medals, 24 total medals (2009)
- Russia/USSR: Winner of most Volleyball World Championships (men), 6 (1949, 1952, 1960, 1962, 1978, 1982) (2006)
- Russia/USSR: Winner of most Volleyball World Championships (women), 6 (1952, 1956, 1960, 1970, 1990, 2006) (2006)
- Russia/USSR: Winner of most Volleyball World Cups (men), 5 (1965, 1977, 1981, 1991, 1999) (2009)
- Russia/USSR: Best performance at World Weightlifting Championships (men), 350 gold medals, 746 total medals (2007)
- Russia/USSR: Best performance at FILA Wrestling World Championships, 64 times winner in three team tournaments (2009)

== Technology ==
- Economist Intelligence Unit e-readiness rankings 2007, ranked 57 out of 69 countries
- Most television broadcast stations, 7,306 (as of 1998)
- World Intellectual Property Organization: Global Innovation Index 2026, ranked 58 out of 139 countries

== Transport ==
- Largest total length of electrified railways, over 44,000 km

== See also ==
- Lists of countries
- Lists by country
- List of international rankings
