= Shale gas in China =

Overview of shale gas use in China

Although production rates were small as of 2013, the volume of technically recoverable unconventional shale gas in China has been estimated to be 1,115 trillion cubic feet (31.6 trillion cubic meters), the largest of any country in the world. As of 2013, China is one of only three countries (with the US and Canada) to produce shale gas in commercial quantities.

China is turning to natural gas as a way to decrease air pollution created by burning coal. In 2011, 70 percent of China’s energy consumption came from coal, 18 percent from oil and only 4.5% came from natural gas. Although conventional natural gas production in China has increased rapidly since 2000, it has not kept up with demand, and China has increasing imports of gas. In 2011, China consumed 147 bcm of natural gas, but produced only 107 bcm; the remainder, 27 percent of national consumption, was imported. Shale gas is seen as a way to reduce or eliminate dependence on imported gas.

== Resource estimates ==
In 2013, the US Energy Information Administration (EIA) updated it estimation of China's shale gas reserves, reporting that China had 1115 trillion cubic feet (31 trillion cubic meters) of recoverable shale gas. However, as of November 2014, commercial viability for tapping unconventional hydrocarbon resources in China had yet to be demonstrated in full force.

The majority of Chinese shale reserves are in 3 basins – Sichuan, Tarim and Yangtze Platform, accounting for 89% of the estimated national reserves. The Fuling gas field is China's largest shale gas field.

== Development ==
In 2013, China produced 200 million cubic meters (7.1 billion cubic feet) of natural gas from shale formations, which was less than 0.2 percent of China’s total natural gas production. The 2013 production was up from 30 million cubic meters in 2012. China has a goal of producing 6.8 billion cubic meters of shale gas in 2015, which would equal 5.5 percent of total 2013 gas production.

China has set its companies a target of producing 30 billion cubic meters (bcm) a year from shale, equivalent to almost half the country's gas consumption in 2008. Potential gas-bearing shales are said to be widespread in China, although as yet undeveloped. In November 2009, US President Barack Obama agreed to share US gas-shale technology with China, and to promote US investment in Chinese shale-gas development. Given widespread interest among international oil companies to invest in shale gas extraction in China, it is possible that shale gas could account for as much as 5% of the nation's gas production by 2020.

Although China faces several challenges to develop efficient shale gas extraction, such as the geology and terrain are much more complex than that of United States, lack of water resources, immature expertises, etc., and large-scale commercial production of shale gas has yet to begin, the government is optimistic about China’s future shale gas production. The Ministry of Land Resources has set aggressive targets of 6.5 bcm/yr by 2015 and at least 60 bcm /yr by 2020.

To support the industry, China has held two auctions with more than 20 shale gas blocks being leased to 18 companies. After slow progress by the initial leaseholders, a third auction is expected to take place in early 2014. Together with the auctions, the government also issued several related regulations and policies, including production and infrastructure construction goals and subsidies to boost the development of shale gas.

Chinese investment in shale gas exploration between 2009 and 2014 have been estimated at $3.7 billion.

In 2017, the shale gas production was 9 bcm by using the indigenous equipment.

== See also ==
- Natural gas in China
