= Natural gas in Russia =

The U.S. and Russia have been the predominant producers of natural gas.

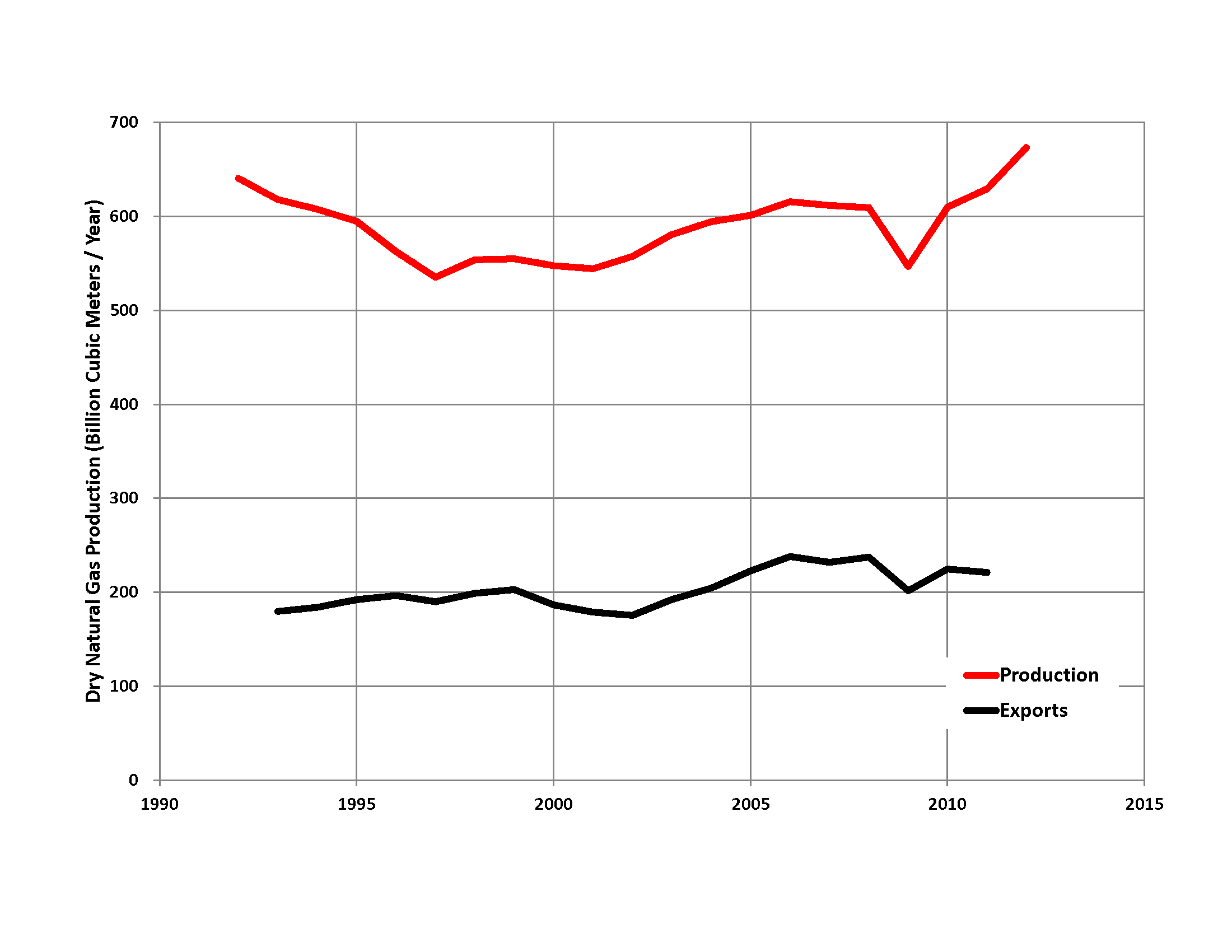
Russian natural gas production (red) and exports (black), 1993–2011.

In 2021 Russia was the world's second-largest producer of natural gas, producing an estimated 701 billion cubic meters (bcm) of gas a year, and the world's largest natural gas exporter, shipping an estimated 250 bcm a year. Russia's pipeline exports contracted significantly due to the Russo-Ukrainian war, with Gazprom's exports falling from 185 billion cubic meters in 2021 to around 100 billion in 2022. This decline was driven by an energy dispute where Russia cut off supplies to countries that did not comply with its payment demands in rubles, coupled with the sabotage of the Nord Stream pipelines. Russia has since redirected portions of its energy exports to Asia; however, increased natural gas sales to countries like China and India have not fully offset the severe financial and structural revenue losses.

According to The World Factbook estimate, the country also has the largest proven reserves (47 trillion cubic meters (tcm)). BP estimates Russian reserves to be 33 tcm. Additionally, Russia is likely to have the largest volume of undiscovered natural gas deposits, an additional 6.7 tcm, according to 2011 US Geological Survey estimations. Russia consumes approximately 460 bcm a year. Flaring is a problem in Russia.

== Subsidies ==
There is a long history of subsidy of natural gas in Russia. Subsidies for natural gas has been one of the reasons for the limited growth of renewable energy in the country. However, it is difficult to estimate the extent of subsidy, as there is no benchmark price. Although economists frequently use export netback calculations to estimate Russia's domestic gas subsidies, critics argue this benchmark is invalid because it does not reflect actual local production costs.

Gazprom has had its gas sale price to domestic and industrial customers regulated by the Russian government since 1991, sometimes close to the operational cost, meaning that it needs to obtain high export sale values to generate a profit to subsidise the poor domestic return.

The IEA estimated 2021 gas subsidies at US$42 billion, the largest in the world (it also estimated electricity subsidies as the largest). Between 2014 and 2021 domestic gas prices in Russia increased annually by between 2% and 7%, in 2022 prices rose 8.5% with a 2023 price rise of a further 8%.

== Consumption ==
In 2022 over 40% of electricity was generated by gas.

=== Automotive ===
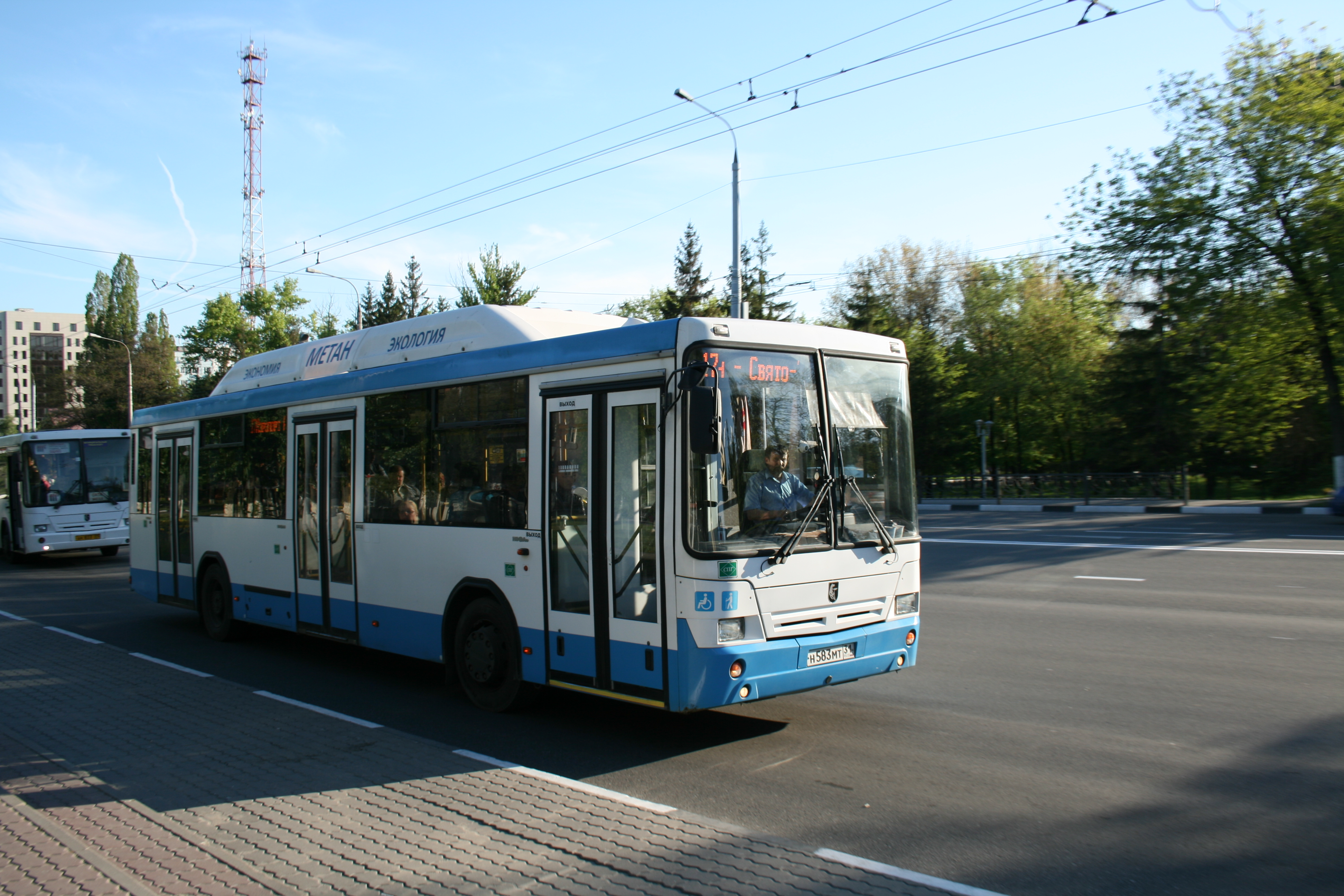
NefAZ bus with methane gas engine in Belgorod

The use of natural gas cars in Russia is encouraged by the government. Aftermarket conversion kits are sold by companies like Italgas, while some GAZ Group vehicles are sold with natural gas systems. As of late 2016, Gazprom has a network of 254 filling stations in the country, with plans to reach 500 stations by 2020. The NEFAZ bus manufacturing company makes gas-powered buses using Daimler engines. A natural gas variant of the Lada Vesta was introduced in 2017.

== Flaring ==
Russia flares more than any other country. The level of flaring increased in 2022 following the loss of the export pipelines to the EU to 1.6 bcm per annum, 9,000 tonnes of CO_{2} being emitted daily.

== Exports ==
=== The EU ===
The European Union in 2020 received over 50% of its natural gas from Russia, with around 40% in 2021 (140 bcm). In 2022, following the Russo-Ukrainian war Russia began to restrict gas supply to the EU in response to countries expressing support for Ukraine. The supply of gas has not been made a subject of EU sanctions, although the payment system was restricted. Germany, previously the main purchaser of Russian gas, reduced, then ceased imports by December 2022, as had most of the other EU countries. 2022 saw the EU buy just 60 bcm of gas from Russia.

Production of Russian gas in 2022 was 20% lower than in 2021 and it is likely to be years before Russia will find alternative buyers for the lost 120 bcm EU export market.

The EU aims to end gas imports from Russia by 2027, including LNG.

=== China ===
On 21 May 2014, Russia and China announced an agreement between state controlled gas companies Gazprom and China National Petroleum Corporation after a decade of negotiations. Under the agreement, Russia will supply China 38bcm of natural gas each year for 30 years, starting in 2018. Both countries will be responsible for building new infrastructure to make the transport possible. Russia will spend about US$55 billion to build a pipeline from Siberia to Vladivostok, while China will spend $20 billion on infrastructure within its borders. The Kovykta and Chayanda gas fields which will supply the majority of the natural gas are currently largely undeveloped.

Tentative agreements had been reached several times since 2005, but each time final negotiations broke down over price. The agreed upon price was not disclosed, but those familiar with the situation said getting a lower price than European buyers was a key demand of China in the negotiations. However, Russian representatives said the price would fluctuate based on the market price of oil, making the deal closer to what Russia had wanted than to what China had been asking for. The total value of the deal was estimated at US$400 billion. It will increase Russian exports to countries not part of the former Soviet Union by 25% and make China the country's 2nd largest customer, after Germany.

The agreement was reached as Chinese and Russian leaders met to discuss greater cooperation in Asia without involvement of Western powers. It was seen as an important political and economic victory for Russian President Vladimir Putin. It allows Russia to diversify its natural business outside of Europe and weakens the force of economic sanctions placed by the West in the aftermath of the Russian annexation of Crimea. More generally, it allows Russia to reduce its isolation due to the Russo-Ukrainian war. For China, the deal helps lessen its dependence on coal to produce electric power, using a cleaner method of electricity generation through natural gas. It also helps meet the country's growing demand for natural gas.

The Power of Siberia pipeline, was commissioned in December 2019. Carrying a maximum of 61 bcm per annum, it runs 3,968 km (2,466 mi) to the Chinese border, where it then connect to a 3,371 km (2,095 mi) pipeline to distribute the gas in China.

A new pipeline Power of Siberia 2, with a 50 bcm annual capacity that will run 6,700 km (4,200 mi) across Russia, Mongolia and China is proposed for construction 2024–2029.

=== Turkey ===
Much natural gas in Turkey is imported from Russia through pipelines under the Black Sea.

=== Disputes with Ukraine ===
==== 2005-2009 ====
Since 2005, the Russian gas supplier Gazprom and the Ukrainian oil and gas company Naftogaz have been involved in a number of disputes. These disputes have grown beyond simple business disputes into transnational political issues that threaten natural gas supplies in numerous European countries dependent on natural gas imports from Russian suppliers, which are transported through Ukraine.

During 2005, Russia claimed Ukraine was not paying for gas, but diverting that which was intended to be exported to the EU from the pipelines. Ukrainian officials at first denied the accusation, but later Naftogaz admitted that natural gas intended for other European countries was retained and used for domestic needs. The dispute reached a peak on 1 January 2006, when Russia cut off all gas supplies passing through Ukrainian territory. On 4 January 2006, a preliminary agreement between Russia and Ukraine was achieved, and the supply was restored. New disputes over Ukrainian gas debts led to reduction of gas supplies in March 2008. During the last months of 2008, relations once again became tense when Ukraine and Russia could not agree on the debts owed by Ukraine.

In January 2009, this disagreement resulted in supply disruptions in many European nations, with eighteen European countries reporting major drops in or complete cut-offs of their gas supplies transported through Ukraine from Russia. In September 2009 officials from both countries stated they felt the situation was under control and that there would be no more conflicts over the topic, at least until the Ukrainian 2010 presidential elections. However, in October 2009, another disagreement arose about the amount of gas Ukraine would import from Russia in 2010. Ukraine intended to import less gas in 2010 as a result of reduced industry needs because of its economic recession; however, Gazprom insisted that Ukraine fulfill its contractual obligations and purchase the previously agreed upon quantities of gas.

On 8 June 2010, a Stockholm court of arbitration ruled Naftogaz of Ukraine must return 12.1 billion cubic metres (430 billion cubic feet) of gas to RosUkrEnergo, a Swiss-based company in which Gazprom controls a 50% stake. Russia accused the Ukrainian side of siphoning gas from pipelines passing through Ukraine in 2009. Several high-ranking Ukrainian officials stated the return "would not be quick".

==== 2014 ====
In 2014, Russia seized Crimea and took assets belonging to Ukraine, with no compensation paid. In 2023, A court in The Hague ordered Russia to pay US$5 billion in compensation to Naftogaz.

=== Effect on Russian natural gas during war with Ukraine ===
The Russo-Ukrainian war caused the weaponising of natural gas, which Russia tried to use to stop Western European countries from providing support to Ukraine. Threatening and then actually restricting gas supplies to Western Europe resulted in Nord Stream 1 deliveries being halted indefinitely, with Nord Stream 2 having had its commissioning put on hold by Germany following Russia's recognition of the Ukrainian separatist regions of the Donetsk People's Republic and the Luhansk People's Republic as independent, was followed by the September 26 2022 Nord Stream pipeline sabotage.

Sanctions on Russian banks make it hard for Gazprom to receive money from international sales, which in 2022 fell 45.5% to 100.9bcm.

Gazprom published a loss during the second half of 2022 of 1.3 trillion roubles ($17.3 billion) after losing 75% of its export sales.

As of 2024, the Urengoy–Pomary–Uzhhorod pipeline in Sudzha was the last remaining point through which natural gas flowed from Russia to Europe via Ukraine.

== See also ==
- 2021–2022 global energy crisis – Worldwide crisis affected by shortage of energy supplies
- 2022 Russia–European Union gas dispute – Fossil fuel financing-related conflicts
- Energy in Russia
- Energy policy of China
- Energy policy of Russia
- Environmental injustice in Europe – Exposure of groups to environmental harms
- List of countries by natural gas consumption
- List of countries by natural gas exports
- List of countries by natural gas production
- List of countries by natural gas proven reserves
- List of natural gas pipelines
- Natural gas prices – Wholesale prices in the market of natural gas
- Natural gas transmission system of Ukraine
- Russia in the European energy sector
- Russia–Ukraine gas disputes – Disputes between Naftogaz Ukrayiny and Gazprom
