= List of countries by natural gas exports =

World Natural Gas Production by country according to OPEC, in 2025

This is a list of countries by natural gas exports based on statistics from the U.S. Energy Information Administration (EIA).

The gas amounts in this list are the gross amount of natural gas exported. (So, for example, Greece is listed as exporting 11 billion cubic metres (BCM) of gas in 2022; however, most of this amount consisted of imported gas transshipped through Greece from other countries. During 2022, Greece produced about 3 BCM, consumed about 5 BCM, and imported approximately 16 BCM.)

Natural Gas in this list means dry natural gas. This is used in homes and business for heating, cooling, cooking and electricity generation. It can also be compressed and used as a fuel.

Dry natural gas in mainly composed of methane. In contrast, wet natural gas also contains significant portions of other liquids such as ethane, propane and butane (also known as Natural Gas Liquids). Wet natural gas is used for petrochemicals as well as gasoline (petrol).

In 2022, the United States has led the world in both natural gas production and natural gas exports.

Until 2022, Russia was the world's largest exporter of natural gas, exporting over 250 BCM of natural gas in some years. However, following the Russian invasion of Ukraine on February 24, 2022, Russian natural gas exports plummeted. The steep decline in exports was mostly caused by western countries sanctioning Russian energy. In 2022 Russia exported 176 BCM of natural gas compared to 251 BCM in 2021, a reduction of 75 bcm.

== Countries in order of export volumes ==
Country	Continent	Natural gas exports 2022 (million m^{3})
United States	North America	195,000
Russia	Europe/Asia	176,000
Qatar	Asia	126,000
Norway	Europe	121,000
Australia	Oceania	106,000
Canada	North America	85,000
Algeria	Africa	50,000
Turkmenistan	Asia	45,000
Netherlands	Europe	43,000
Malaysia	Asia	39,000
United Kingdom	Europe	23,000
Azerbaijan	Asia/Europe	22,000
Indonesia	Asia	22,000
Nigeria	Africa	20,000
Iran	Asia	19,000
France	Europe	15,000
Oman	Asia	15,000
Myanmar	Asia	13,000
Greece	Europe	11,000
Papua New Guinea	Oceania	11,000
Trinidad and Tobago	North America	11,000
Bolivia	South America	10,000
Belgium	Europe	9,900
Israel	Asia	9,600
Egypt	Africa	9,300
Kazakhstan	Asia/Europe	7,800
United Arab Emirates	Asia	7,000
Brunei Darussalam	Asia	6,100
Spain	Europe	6,100
Uzbekistan	Asia	5,600
China	Asia	5,600
Equatorial Guinea	Africa	5,000
Peru	South America	5,000
Italy	Europe	4,600
Angola	Africa	4,100
Mozambique	Africa	4,000
Argentina	South America	3,400
Timor-Leste	Asia	2,900
Libya	Africa	2,600
Denmark	Europe	2,000
Lithuania	Europe	1,900
Cameroon	Africa	1,800
Croatia	Europe	1,000
Romania	Europe	800
Estonia	Europe	700
Poland	Europe	600
Turkey	Asia/Europe	600
Singapore	Asia	400
Japan	Asia	300
Finland	Europe	100
Dominican Republic	North America	<100
Mexico	North America	<100
South Korea	Asia	<100
Sweden	Europe	<100
Ukraine	Europe	<100
World		1,288,000

== See also ==
- List of countries by natural gas imports
- List of countries by natural gas production
- List of countries by oil exports
- List of countries by natural gas consumption
- List of countries by natural gas proven reserves
