= List of countries by natural gas proven reserves =

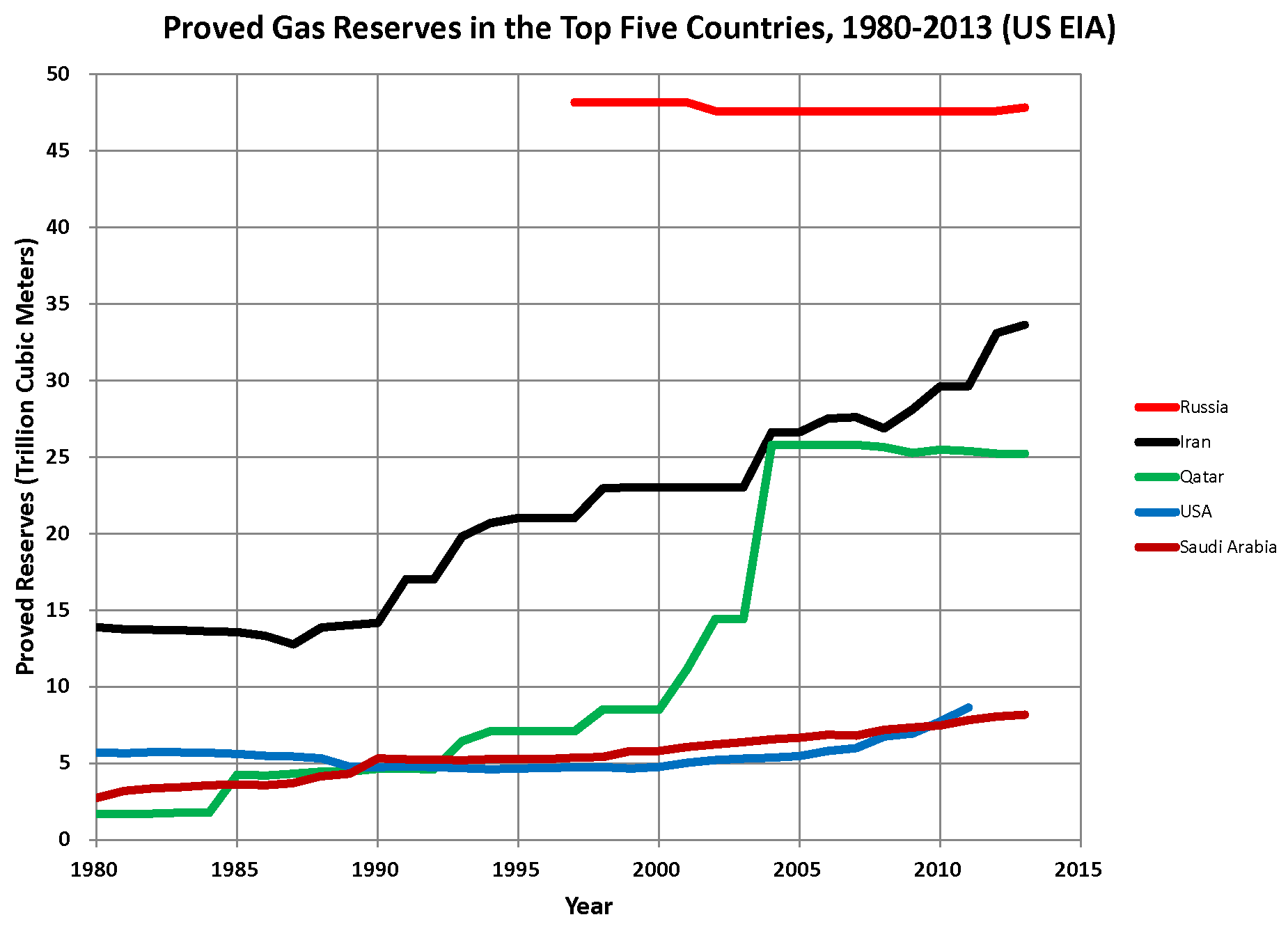
Trends in the five countries with largest proven reserves of natural gas, according to the US Energy Information Administration

Countries by natural gas proven reserves (2014), based on data from the CIA World Factbook

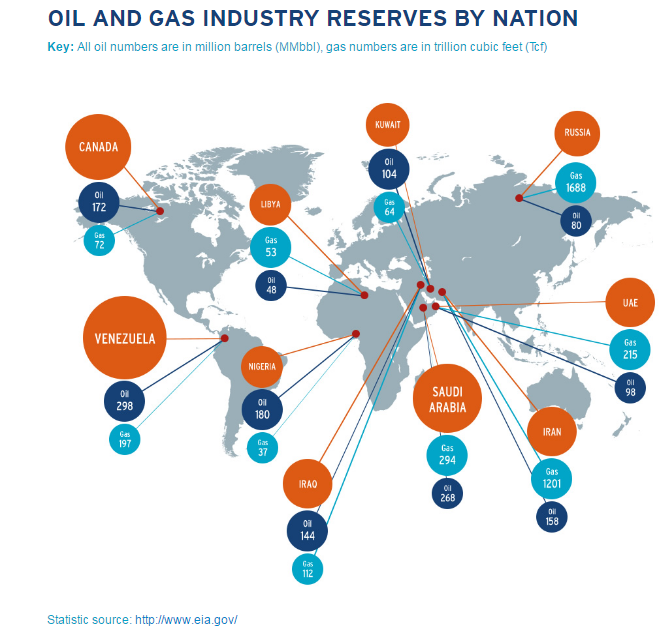
Countries by natural gas and oil proven reserves (2015)

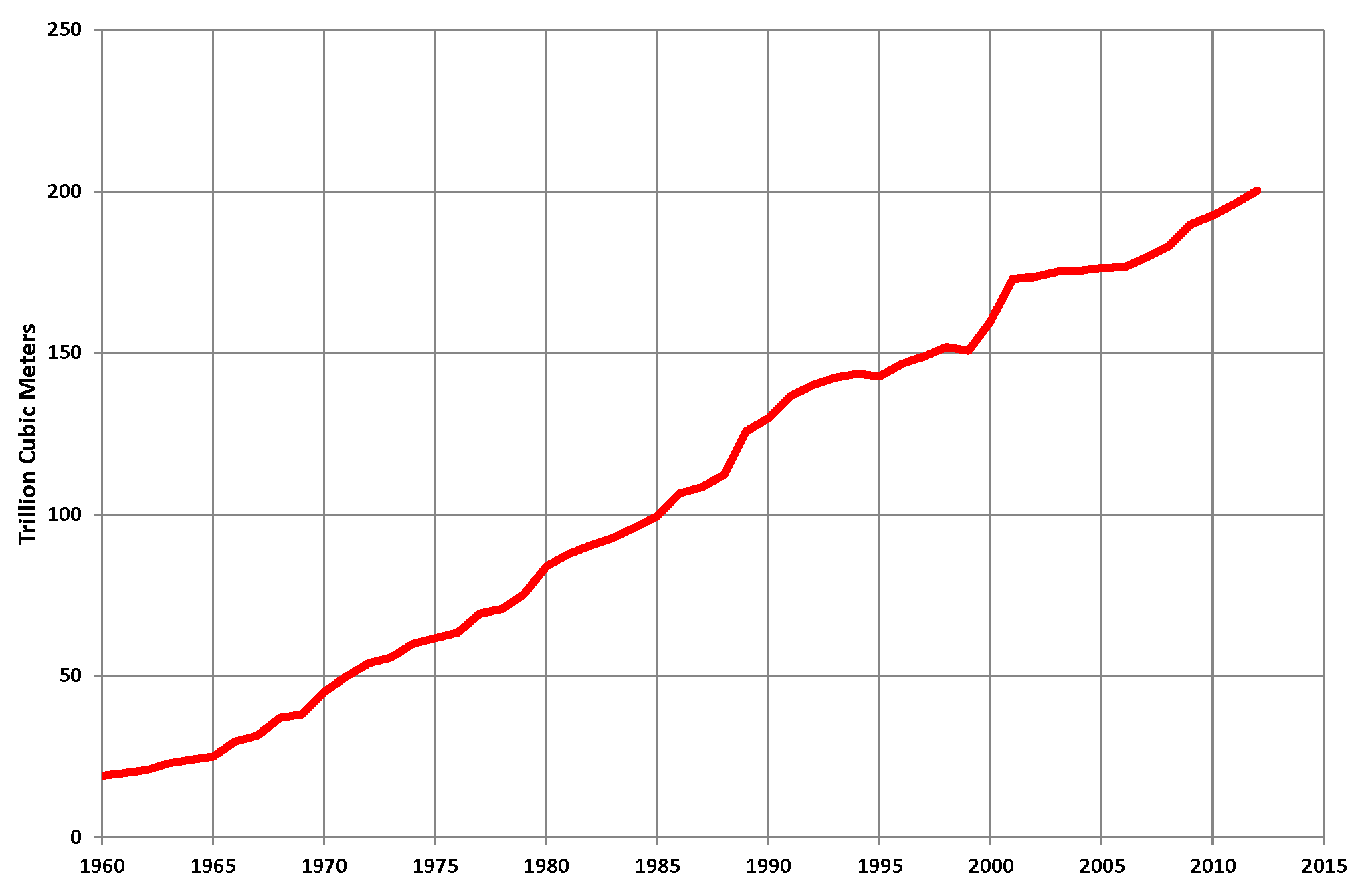
World natural gas proven reserves 1960–2012 (OPEC)

This list is based on the CIA World Factbook (when no citation is given) or other authoritative third-party sources (as cited). Based on data from EIA, at the start of 2021, proven gas reserves were dominated by three countries: Iran, Russia, and Qatar.

There is some disagreement on which country has the largest proven gas reserves. Sources that consider Russia in possession of the world's largest proven reserves include the US CIA (47,600 cubic kilometers), the US Energy Information Administration (EIA) (49,000 km^{3}), and OPEC (48,810 km^{3}). However, BP credits Russia with only 32,900 km^{3}, which would place it in second place, slightly behind Iran (33,100 to 33,800 km^{3}, depending on the source).

Due to constant announcements of shale gas recoverable reserves, as well as drilling in Central Asia, South America, Africa, and deepwater drilling, estimates are updated frequently. Since 2000, some countries, notably the US and Canada, have seen large increases in proven gas reserves due to development of shale gas, but shale gas deposits in most countries are yet to be added to reserve calculations.

== List ==
Note: * indicates that the linked article is about natural gas production in the country or territory specifically, such as natural gas in Russia.

Proven reserves (in billions of cubic metres)
Country	U.S. EIA (2021)	OPEC (2018-2024)	BP (end of 2020)	CIA World Factbook (2006–18)	Production (2024)	Years of production in reserve
Russia *	47,800	46,830	37,400	47,800.000	642	73
Iran *	34,000	33,990	32,100	33,720.000	279	122
Qatar *	23,900	23,861	24,700	24,070.000	170	140
Turkmenistan *	10,000	9,838	13,600	7,504.000	78	126
Saudi Arabia *	9,430	9,730	6,000	8,619.000	123	79
United States *	17,710	9,067	12,600	7,716.000	1,069	8
United Arab Emirates *	6,090	8,210	5,900	6,091.000	59	139
Nigeria *	5,750	5,980	5,500	5,475.000	39	153
Venezuela *	6,000	5,510	6,300	5,739.000	25	220
Algeria *	4,500	4,500	2,300	4,504.000	99	45
Iraq *	3,740	3,710	3,500	3,820.000	10	371
Australia *	3,230	3,173	2,400	1,989.000	152	21
Mozambique *	3,000			2,832.000	12	250
Malaysia *	1,200	2,909	900	1,183.000	81	36
China *	6,650	2,890	8,400	5,440.000	258	11
Indonesia *	1,000	2,866	1,300	2,866.000	70	41
Norway *	1,600	2,314	1,400	1,782.000	131	18
Egypt *	1,800	2,221	2,100	2,186.000	47	47
Canada *	2,100	2,059	2,400	2,056.000	199	10
Kazakhstan *	2,400	1,898	2,300	2,407.000	29	65
Kuwait *	1,800	1,780	1,700	1,784.000	20	89
Uzbekistan *	1,800	1,564	800	1,841.000	46	34
Azerbaijan *	2,000	1,227	2,500	991.100	38	32
India *	1,400	1,150	1,300	1,290.000	36	32
Senegal	–		1,000	0.000	0.00	-
Oman *	650	884	700	651.300	44	20
Netherlands *	130	804	130	801.400	9.7	83
Pakistan *	590	757	400	588.800	24	32
Libya	1,500	730	1,400	1,505.000	12	61
Turkey *	710			5.097	2.3	309
Greece	680			0.991	0.01	68,000
Peru *	310	513	261	455.900	14	37
Yemen *	480		300	478.500	0.12	4,000
Morocco *	1.44	474		1.444	0.12	3,950
Guyana	453			0.000	0.00	-
Trinidad and Tobago *	310	433	290	447.400	25	17
Angola *	340	422		308.100	5.8	73
Argentina *	487	381	400	336.600	47	8
Bangladesh *	130	346	110	185.800	20	17
Brazil *	370	325	300	377.400	22	15
Bolivia *	310	310	213	295.900	11	28
Ukraine *	1,100	304	1,100	1,104.000	18	17
Syria *	240	300	269	240.700	3.7	81
Congo *	300	280		90.610	1.8	156
Myanmar *	650	273	400	637.100	13	21
United Kingdom *	180	269	187	176.000	31	9
Brunei *	260	252	222	260.500	11	23
Vietnam *	710	203	600	699.400	6.4	32
Timor-Leste	–			200.000	6.10	33
Israel *	180		589	176.000	27	7
Papua New Guinea *	180		163	210.500	11	16
Thailand *	140	180	143	193.400	27	7
Cameroon *	140	152		135.100	2.5	61
Mexico	180	146	178	279.800	31	5
Cyprus	–			141.600	0.00	-
Romania *	100	105	78	105.500	9.2	11
Colombia *	88	104	86	113.900	10	10
Philippines *	99			98.540	1.7	58
Bahrain *	82		64.8	92.030	19	4
Sudan *	80			84.950	0.00	-
Denmark *	30	73.9	100	12.860	2.2	34
Cuba *	71			70.790	1	71
Tunisia *	65			65.130	1.2	54
South Sudan *	–			63.710	0.00	-
Namibia *	62			62.290	0.00	-
Rwanda *	60			56.630	0.06	1,000
Poland *	91	56.3	72.2	79.790	5.2	11
Afghanistan *	51			49.550	0.08	638
Serbia *	48			48.140	0.3	160
Equatorial Guinea *	140	40		36.810	6.7	6
Germany	20	39.6	100	39.500	4.1	10
Palestine *	32			0.000	0.00	-
New Zealand *	31			33.700	3.3	9
Gabon *	30	30		28.320	0.5	60
Ivory Coast *	30			28.320	2.7	11
Mauritania *	30			28.320	0.00	-
Croatia	30			24.920	0.7	43
Ethiopia *	30			24.920	0.00	-
Italy *	45	27.1	100	38.110	2.6	10
Ghana	20			22.650	3.4	6
Japan *	20			20.900	1.1	18
Slovakia	10			14.160	0.06	167
Uganda	10			14.160	0.00	-
Ireland *	10			9.911	1.1	9
Georgia	8	8.5		8.495	0.01	850
France	8			8.410	0.02	400
South Korea *	8			7.079	0.05	160
Tanzania *	6			6.513	2	3
Austria	6			6.513	0.5	12
Taiwan *	6			6.229	0.09	67
Jordan *	6			6.031	0.2	30
Bulgaria	6			5.663	0.04	150
Tajikistan *	6			5.663	0.02	300
Kyrgyzstan	6			5.663	0.02	300
Somalia *	6			5.663	0.00	-
Albania	6			0.821	0.06	100
Ecuador	10	5.4		10.900	0.3	18
Chile *	99	5.3		97.970	1.1	5
Hungary *	3			6.598	1.7	2
Czech Republic	3			3.964	0.2	15
Belarus *	3			2.832	0.07	43
Guatemala	–			2.960	0.00	-
Spain	2.55			2.548	0.05	51
Benin	1.13			1.133	0.00	-
DR Congo	0.99			0.991	0.00	-
Barbados	0.11			0.142	0.01	11
World	205,500 (2020)	208,890 (2024)	188,100 (end of 2020)	208,400 (start of 2011)	4,218 (2024)	50

Comparison of proven natural gas reserves from different sources (cubic kilometers, as of 31 December 2014/1 January 2015)

Source	Canada	Iran	Russia	Saudi Arabia	United States	Venezuela
BP	2,000	34,000	32,800	8,200	9,800	5,600
OPEC	2,028	34,020	49,541	8,489	9,580	5,617
U.S. Energy Information Administration	2,535	42,426	59,619	10,393	10,441	6,960
