= Fuling gas field =

Natural gas field in Chongqing, China

Fuling
- Country: China
- Region: Chongqing
- Offshore/onshore: onshore
- Operator: Sinopec

Field history
- Discovery: 2014
- Start of production: 2014

Production
- Current production of gas: 28×10^{6} m^{3}/d 970×10^{6} cu ft/d
- Estimated gas in place: 2.1×10^{12} m^{3} 74×10^{12} cu ft

The Fuling gas field is a natural gas field located in Chongqing, China. Discovered in 2014, it was developed by Sinopec, determining it to have initial total proven reserves of around 74 trillion ft^{3} (2100 km^{3}). It began production of natural gas and condensates later that year, with a production rate of around 970 million ft^{3}/day (28×10^{5} m^{3}).
