= List of countries by natural gas imports =

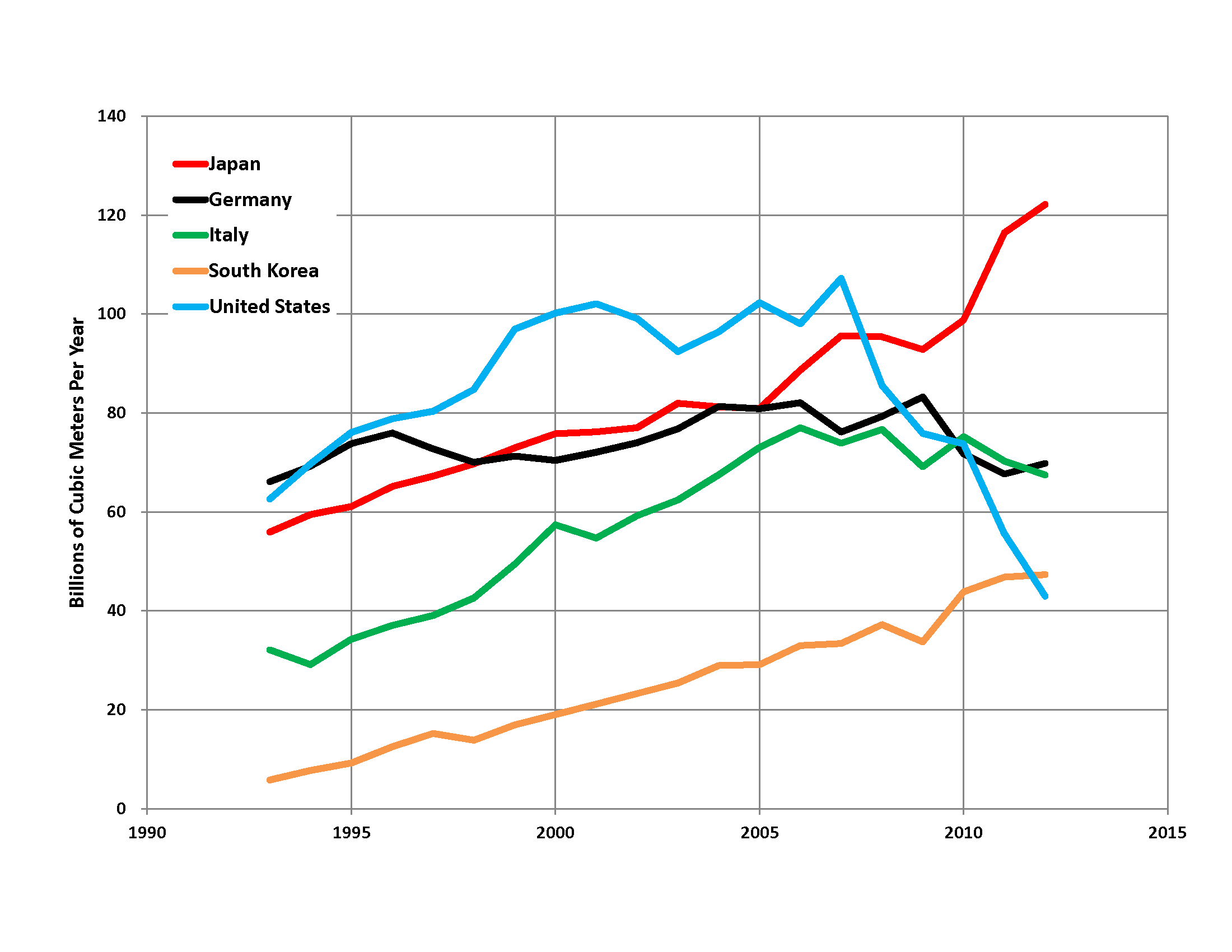
Trends in the five nations with the largest annual net imports of natural gas

This is a list of countries by natural gas imports. For informational purposes, several non-sovereign entities are also included in this list.

Many countries are both importers and exporters of natural gas. For instance, although Canada appears on the list below as the world's 32nd largest gas importer, it exports more natural gas than it imports, and so is a net exporter of natural gas.

== List ==
List of countries by natural gas imports (2024)
Country/Region	Natural gas imports (kg/year)	Trade value (thousands USD)
China	76,572,100,000	44,057,223
European Union	72,758,900,000	39,639,573
Japan	65,890,700,000	41,180,084
South Korea	46,317,900,000	29,272,043
India	27,793,900,000	14,984,892
France	20,684,200,000	10,915,239
Netherlands	13,440,400,000	8,441,974
Spain	11,981,200,000	5,963,227
Thailand	11,417,400,000	6,682,340
Italy	10,584,900,000	5,290,749
Egypt	9,286,660,000	4,900,650
Pakistan	7,544,960,000	3,981,542
Singapore	6,781,300,000	3,484,945
Belgium	5,808,620,000	2,740,413
Germany	4,789,710,000	2,848,679
Brazil	3,258,490,000	2,213,190
Malaysia	3,245,510,000	2,185,242
Portugal	3,177,570,000	1,292,450
South Africa	2,953,220,000	413,479
Chile	2,024,770,000	732,979
United States	1,873,050,000	988,426
Dominican Republic	1,842,140,000	790,127
Lithuania	1,819,110,000	1,015,737
Mexico	1,729,230,000	930
Croatia	1,720,000,000	974,224
Finland	1,626,860,000	867,572
Colombia	1,625,300,000	945,447
Greece	1,609,300,000	1,249,174
Philippines	1,185,000,000	767,726
Argentina	1,139,650,000	675,501
Hong Kong	698,219,000	344,727
Canada	684,796,000	232,056
Ireland	559,184,000	306,481
Cambodia	483,862,000	334,391
Jordan	387,954,000	271,795
Sweden	374,445,000	218,002
El Salvador	350,079,000	181,482
Senegal	63,486,700	39,947
Norway	55,732,400	33,403
Estonia	26,676,600	15,129
Togo	26,000,000	51,436
Czech Republic	20,759,200	15,079
Barbados	18,707,300	11,148
Lesotho	7,034,890	9,083
Bahamas	6,846,560	4,035
North Macedonia	4,537,380	3,486
Switzerland	3,875,920	3,341
Austria	3,063,660	2,212
Latvia	2,689,170	1,777
Denmark	1,876,810	718
Hungary	1,569,640	1,077
Luxembourg	1,333,100	563
Antigua and Barbuda	1,327,710	619
Malawi	1,145,730	1,188
Kazakhstan	1,021,440	286
Montenegro	989,618	1,143
Guyana	896,028	675
Samoa	601,680	832
Serbia	558,615	487
Slovenia	337,147	308
Bulgaria	223,360	180
Bosnia and Herzegovina	143,895	134
Saudi Arabia	130,543	207
Ecuador	92,171	48
Uganda	77,806	59
Gambia	69,536	135
Zimbabwe	64,370	43
Nigeria	50,000	14
Tunisia	33,487	20
Angola	13,550	21
Mauritania	12,687	8
Tanzania	12,496	1
Panama	2,227	23
Central African Republic	2,000	11
New Zealand	1,208	23
Cayman Islands	727	0
Uruguay	450	9
Zambia	320	1
Iceland	199	1
Burkina Faso	100	0
Grenada	74	0
Bermuda	19	0
Morocco	2	0

== See also ==
- Strategic natural gas reserve
- List of countries by natural gas exports
