= Natural gas in Bolivia =

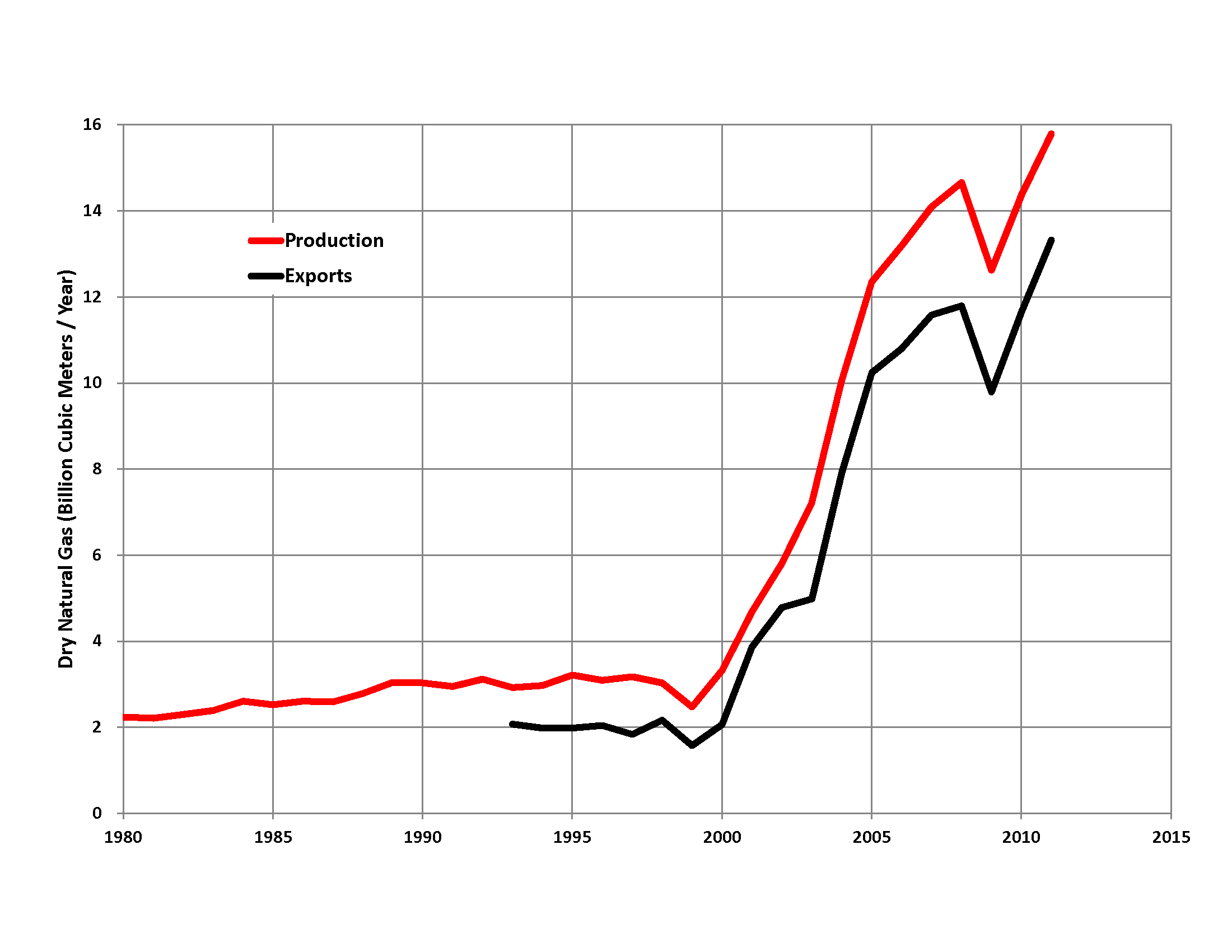
Natural gas production in Bolivia 1980-2012 (red) and gas exports (black).

Natural gas in Bolivia is one of the nation's main energy sources and export products. Bolivia's proved natural gas reserves are estimated to be 10.7 (TCF) (31 December 2017 est.). Most of these reserves are located in the eastern region of the country. The major export pipelines in Bolivia transport the gas to Argentina and Brazil.

In 1994 the natural gas sector was privatized, and it was subsequently re-nationalized in 2006 by president Evo Morales after popular protests during the 2005 Bolivian gas conflict.

== Historical background ==
"Bolivia's economic history reveals a pattern of a single-commodity focus", diversification has only occasionally being the case, due to political and geographical problems. Currently, the situation is no different, and the commodity of the day is natural gas. Natural gas first became significant in Bolivia only relatively recently, after vast discoveries of fields in the late 1980s and early 1990s. At the time these new discoveries aided the country on a modest economic recovery after previous years of serious economic problems (with hyperinflation, recession, and austere stabilization), their most severe since the 1950s, later aggravated by a collapse on the world's tin market in 1985 – tin being Bolivia's most valuable natural commodity at the time.

Bolivia

So currently it is natural gas that has become the country's most valuable natural commodity, substituting what was previously tin and silver. The complication though is that "finding markets to utilize this resource, both domestically and internationally, has been slowed by a lack of infrastructure and conflicts over the state’s role in controlling natural resources."

Most natural petroleum in Bolivia is associated with oil fields. Oil has been known to exist in Bolivia since the colonial period, but serious exploration did not begin until the beginning of the twentieth century. It was during the 1970s that oil production really peaked, only to be followed by a decline in the next decade. That is when natural gas overshadowed oil and tin to become the main hydrocarbon exported by the country up to this date.

Since the 1980s, the number of known reserves has increased substantially. It was during the 1990s that new major discoveries really increased natural gas production in Bolivia. "Major discoveries of natural gas since 1996 had boosted proven and probable gas reserves almost tenfold, to 48.7trn cu ft, by the end of 2004"

== Political context ==
The rise of natural gas as Bolivia's most important export occurred at the same time another important moment of the country's history was happening – it was also during the 1980s that civilian rule and democratic government were restored. This was a moment where many privatizations occurred, and private investment was a big part of the blossoming of the Bolivia natural gas industry.

=== Background ===
What preceded the return to democratic government in the 1980s was a long period of instability. After the Chaco War (1932–1935), during the period of 1936 until 1952, Bolivia had ten presidents (six military). This was a period in which the power was divided between the National Revolutionary Movement (MNR) and military rule.

The most significant changes came with the elections of 1985, which brought to power president Paz Estenssoro (MNR founder), his fourth time as president since 1952. Estenssoro abandoned his left-wing allies and his own populist past and "decreed one of the most austere economic stabilization packages ever implemented in Latin America" called the New Economic Policy (Nueva Política Económica—NPE), the decree "aimed at ending Bolivia’s record-setting hyperinflation and dismantling many of the large and inefficient state enterprises that had been created by the revolution". These free-market liberal reform policies were also followed by subsequent presidents, President Jaime Paz Zamora (1989–1993) and Gonzalo Sánchez de Lozada (1993–1997) which the latter liberalized the economy even further through the IMF (International Monetary Fund) structural adjustment programme.

Lozada's successor, the once before president Hugo Banzer Suárez (1997–2001) also continued the reforms, as well as pursued an aggressive coca-eradication and alternative-crop program that were followed by very strong protests, until Lozada's return to power in the 2002 elections. When Lozada came back to power in 2002, the country by then was going through economic difficulties and the anti-coca campaign led to even further discontent, specially by people of indigenous descent. This led to his resignation and fled of the country in 2003, after demonstrations against his government—the strongest ones against his plans to export natural gas, which sparked the “Bolivian gas war”—that cost him loss of Congressional support.

Lozada's vice president took over the presidency, and at this point natural gas was at the center stage of Bolivian politics, with the "Bolivian gas war" full blown. The war originated from the discontent of Bolivian people with the distribution of revenues from what they saw as the biggest source of wealth of the country. It was under Lozada's vice president's rule that in July 2004 a referendum was called, to calm down the violent protests and to decide the future of Bolivia's natural gas reserves. In the referendum “more Bolivian voters answered yes than no to five convoluted questions which, taken together, empower the government to exert greater control over the export and sale of the country's vast oil and gas wealth.” But the referendum had no direct impact on the future of the energy sector.

In light of these events, new presidential elections were held in 2005. Discontent with the result of the implementation of these reforms throughout the past decades (that ultimately led to the “Bolivian gas war”) definitely contributed to the election of Evo Morales in 2005, since he defended a return to the model of strong state intervention in the economy and was an opponent of the coca-eradication program.

=== Nationalization ===
Despite past bad experiences with nationalizations of Bolivia's tin industry in 1952 and nationalizations of the hydrocarbon industry in 1937 and 1969, Morales kept his campaign promises and nationalized the gas industry soon after elected, in May 2006.

After signing a decree to nationalize the natural gas industry, President Evo Morales dramatically took over and occupied installations by using military force on May 1, 2005. Even though he stated that expropriations would not occur, the short period of six months given to renegotiate contracts put great pressure on the main foreign companies exploring for natural gas in Bolivia. The state-owned Brazilian company Petrobrás, was among the most affected, since it was one of Bolivia's largest foreign investors and controlled 14% of the country's natural gas reserves, which in consequence created large concerns in the Brazilian government.

Ultimately, negotiations took place and no further hostilities happened, resulting in agreements with all the companies involved. With the agreements "(…) the state raised its share of the revenues from the two giant fields from 50 percent to 82 percent, while taking only a 60 percent share at Bolivia's minor deposits."

In December 2009, Evo Morales was re-elected for another 5 year-term, winning with 63 percent of the ballots according to unofficial counts by two polling firms. Much of his re-election had to do with his natural gas policy. Higher prices for the natural gas and also minerals, which account for the bulk of Bolivia's exports, have helped sustain economic growth and also President Morales' approval. Enjoying popularity, Morales has also tightened state control not only over the hydrocarbons sector, but also over the mining sector. He has nationalized the main phone company in Bolivia and showed intentions to also control the electrical power industry. "But many analysts believe Morales will be careful not to alienate the foreign investors he needs to increase raw materials output. [In November 2009], Bolivia received a pledge of a $1.5 billion investment from the Spanish-Argentine company Repsol for natural gas development."

== Exploration, development, and production ==
=== Bolivia's numbers on natural gas ===
Production: 14.2 billion cu m (2008 est.) country comparison to the world: 35

Consumption: 2.41 billion cu m (2008 est.) country comparison to the world: 78

Exports: 11.79 billion cu m (2008 est.) country comparison to the world: 17

Imports: 0 cu m (2008 est.) country comparison to the world: 78

Oil and Gas Exploration and Production, 1996–2015
Year	Investment (millions of US dollars)	Wells Drilled	Notes
1996	173	22	
1997	298	23	
1998	605	50	
1999	681	36	
2000	412	41	
2001	428	40	
2002	393	23	
2003	289	22	
2004	217	14	
2005	186	12	
2006	203	4	
2007	215	3	
2008	292	11	
2009	472	10	
2010	574	18	
2011	872	26	
2012	916	35	
2013	1008	61	
2014	2226	47	
2015	1168	45	32 wells completed, 13 continued into 2016
Source: Mamani, Lidia (2016-05-25). "El Gobierno propone ajustes a la ley de incentivos petroleros". Página Siete.

=== Companies involved in exploration ===
The state-owned petrol company of Bolivia is YPFB Yacimientos Petrolíferos Fiscales Bolivianos.

There are many foreign companies involved with the exploration of natural gas in Bolivia, but the two most significant ones are Petrobrás from Brazil and the Spanish-Argentine company Repsol YPF. Others also involved are Total from France, British Gas and British Petroleum as well as the US Exxon Mobil Corporation.

=== Reserves ===
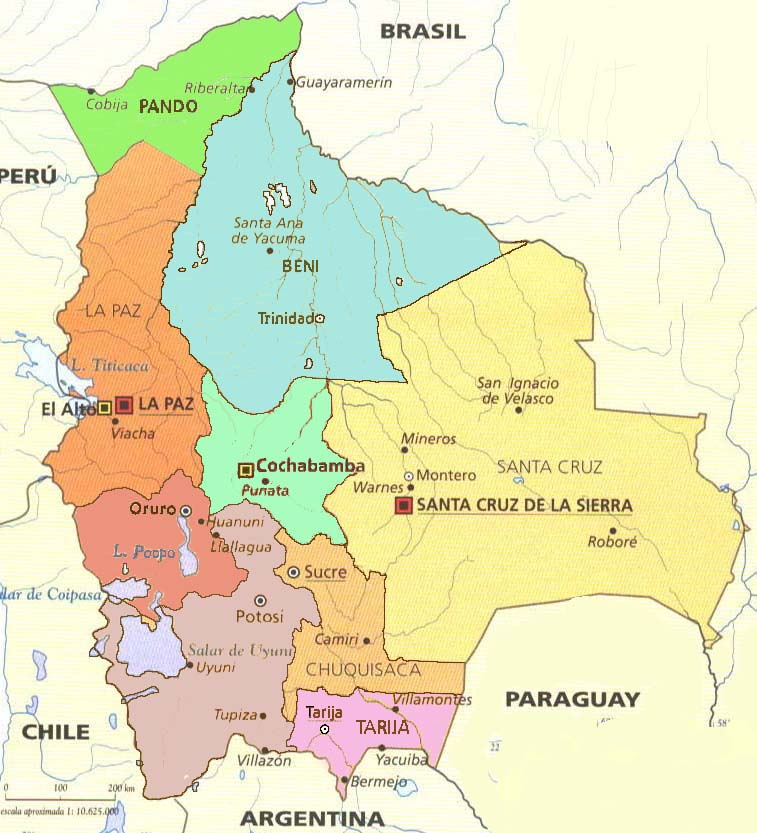
Departments of Tarija, Santa Cruz, Cochabamba and Chuquisaca respectively shown in pink, yellow, light green and orange

Bolivia's proven reserves of natural gas are variously estimated as 280 billion cubic meters, or 9.9 trillion cubic feet (BP, as of 31 December 2015), 281 billion cubic meters, or 9.91 trillion cubic feet (US Energy Information Administration), and 300.5 billion cubic meters, or 10.6 trillion cubic feet (OPEC, as of 31 December 2015). BP, US EIA, and OPEC all place Bolivia's proven gas reserves as the sixth-largest in South America, behind those of Venezuela, Brazil, Peru, Argentina, and Trinidad and Tobago.

Due to its geographic location, in the most prosperous southern part of the continent, Bolivia holds an advantage compared to Venezuela, and holds itself as the more attractive option for shipment by pipeline of its natural gas, mostly to Argentina and Brazil.

Most of these reserves are located in the eastern region of the country. More specifically, they are mostly located in four out of the nine States that form Bolivia, these four States being Tarija (which has 80% of the reserves), Santa Cruz (which has 15% of the reserves) and Cochabamba and Chuquisaca (which share the other 5% of the reserves).

=== Pipelines ===
Pipelines are a key feature of the natural gas business. Without them it is possible to sell gas by liquefying it and shipping it by using tankers, but that presents itself as a more expensive alternative. Exporting natural gas through pipelines is also the reason why relations with neighboring countries is an important feature of the business. It is through pipelines that Bolivia domestically uses and exports its natural gas. The major export pipelines in Bolivia are:

- Gasoducto Argentina (Yabog pipeline) which began operating in 1972 and
- Gasoducto Bolivia-Brazil (GASBOL pipeline) which began operations much later in 1999

The development of other pipelines to export Bolivian gas to other countries in South America, such as Uruguay, have been topic of conversations, but as of today nothing significant has followed through.
