= Natural gas in Malaysia =

Overview of natural gas use in Malaysia

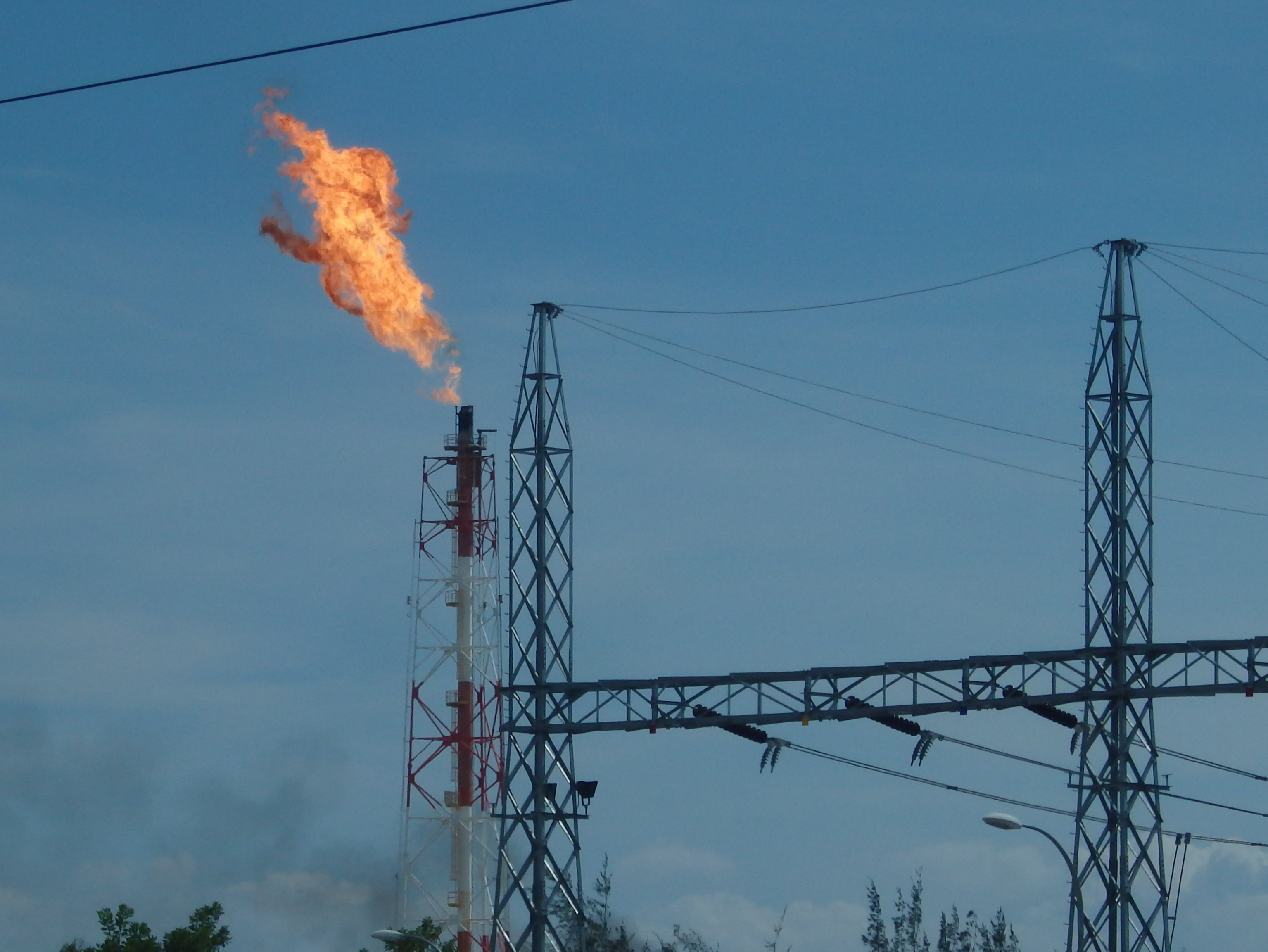
Sabah oil and gas terminal

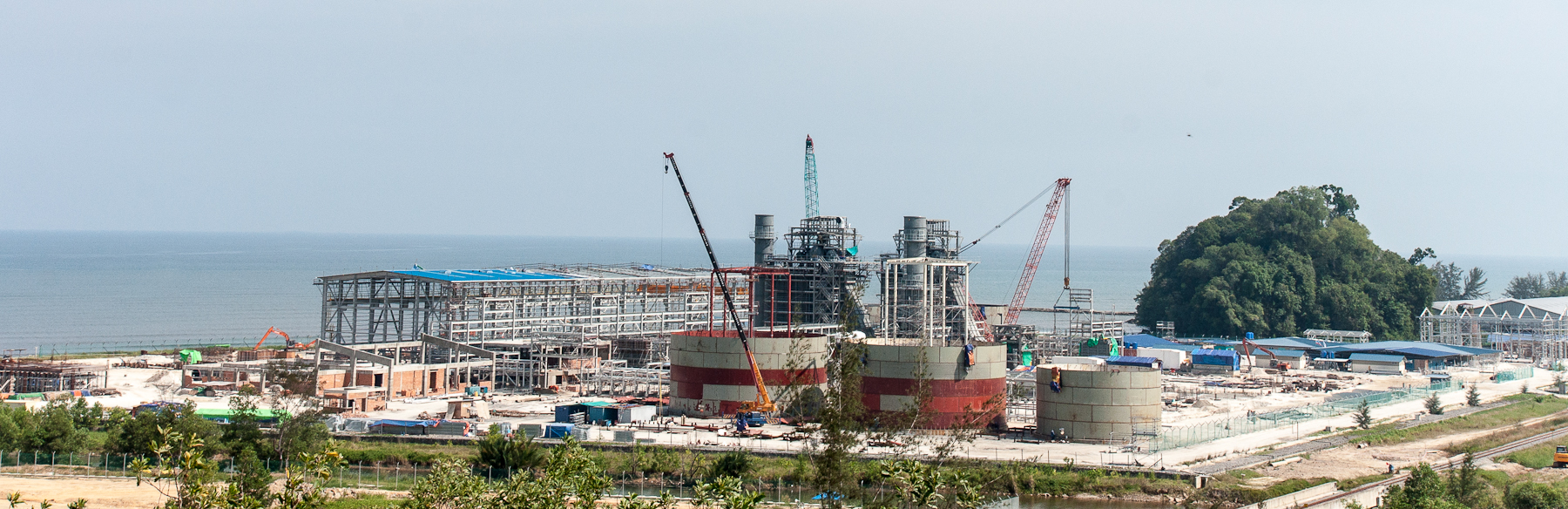
The Sabah oil and gas terminal (SOGT) in Kimanis is part of the Sabah-Sarawak-Pipeline.

Natural gas in Malaysia is a major component of the country's energy system and export economy. Malaysia is one of the world's leading producers and exporters of liquefied natural gas (LNG), while also consuming large volumes of natural gas domestically for electricity generation and industry. Natural gas has historically played a central role in Malaysia's energy mix, though its share in electricity generation has declined since the 2000s as coal power expanded. As of 2023 natural gas accounts for roughly 43% of Malaysia's total primary energy supply and around one third of electricity generation.

Malaysia's natural gas resources are primarily located offshore in the South China Sea near the states of Sabah and Sarawak. Production is dominated by the state-owned oil and gas company Petroliam Nasional Berhad (Petronas), which operates extensive offshore infrastructure, pipelines and LNG facilities. A large portion of Malaysia's gas production is exported as LNG, particularly through the Bintulu LNG complex in Sarawak, one of the largest LNG export facilities in the world. Despite being a major LNG exporter, Malaysia is projected to become a net importer in the next 10 - 20 years due to growing local demand as domestic supplies dwindle.

Natural gas plays a significant role in Malaysia's energy policy and transition planning. Government strategies such as the National Energy Policy and the National Energy Transition Roadmap use natural gas to reduce emissions while building renewable energy capacity. However, analysts have raised concerns that continued investment in gas infrastructure could prolong reliance on fossil fuels and create tensions between LNG exports, domestic energy demand and climate goals.

== Policy context ==
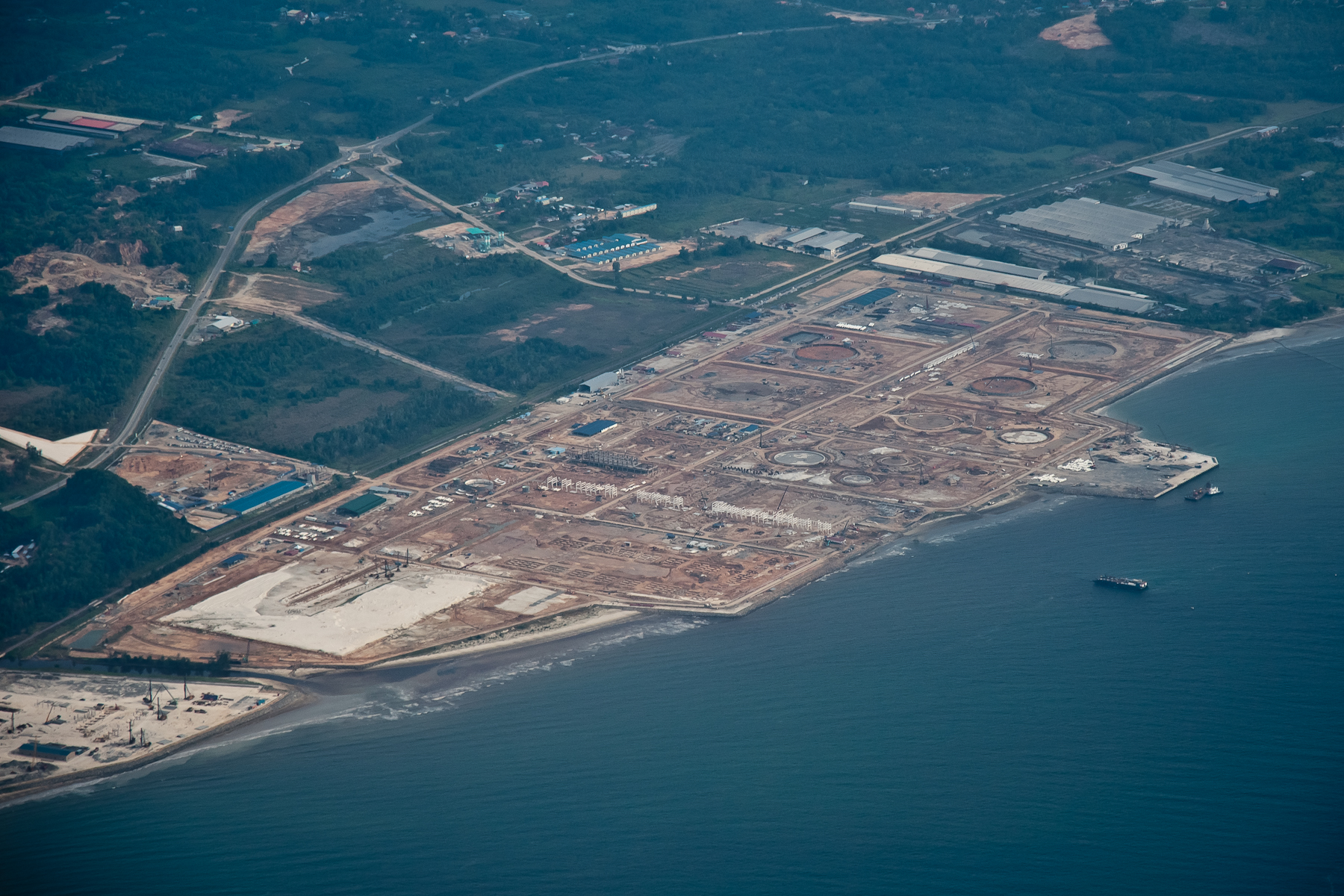
Aerial view of the Sabah Oil and Gas Terminal (SOGT) in Kimanis in 2011

Malaysia's energy system has evolved significantly over the past two decades. In the early 2000s natural gas accounted for the majority of electricity generation, but declining domestic reserves and economic incentives to export LNG led to a shift toward coal-fired power plants. As a result, the share of gas in the electricity mix declined from about 67% in 2005 to around 47% by 2015. As of 2023 natural gas accounts for 43% of Malaysia's total primary energy supply.

Almost 96% of Malaysia's energy supply is generated from fossil fuels. In 2023 renewables made up 4% of Malaysia's energy supply. Malaysia's National Energy Policy (2022-2040) aims to transition away from fossil fuels toward renewable and sustainable energy sources, while safeguarding energy security.

The government's National Energy Transition Roadmap (NETR) includes the National Gas Roadmap (NGR). Under this policy the government states natural gas will be a "transition fuel" away from other fossil fuels and toward higher renewable use, and continue to be Malaysia's largest energy source at 56% of Total Primary Energy Supply (TPES) in 2050.

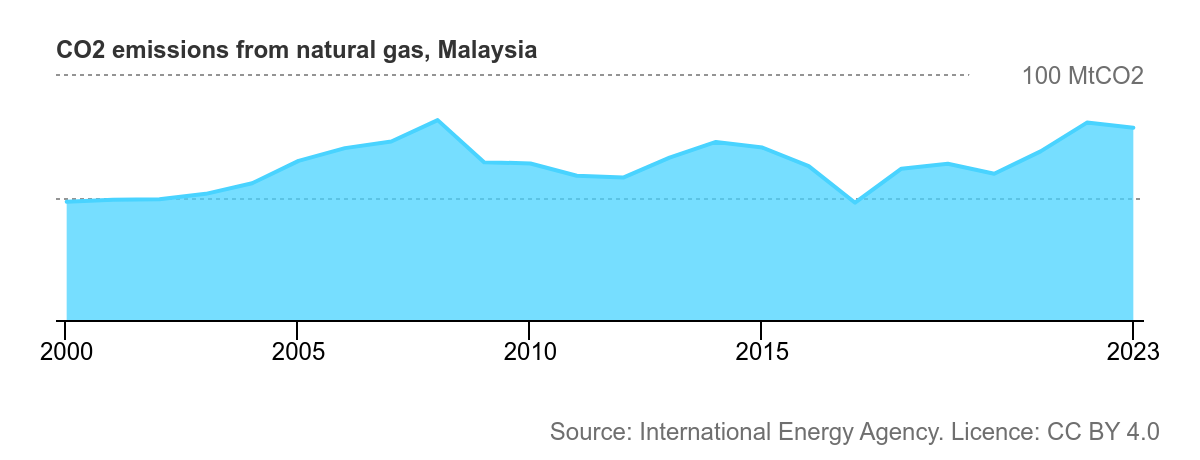
Malaysia's CO2 emissions from natural gas, 2000-2023

The NETR expects renewables to make up 29% of energy generation in 2035 (reducing fossil fuel use to 71% from 96%) and by 2050 to achieve 70% renewables and net zero emissions. To promote the energy transition Malaysia is investing in energy efficiency, renewable energy, hydrogen, bioenergy, green mobility and carbon capture, and energy utilization and storage.

== Economics and usage ==
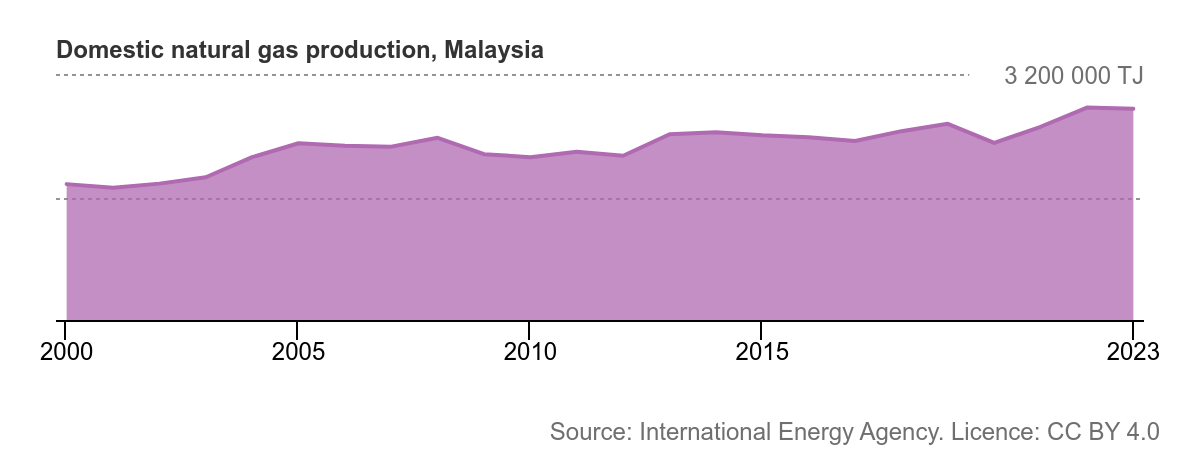
Domestic natural gas production in Malaysia

=== Sources ===
Malaysia's natural gas resources are primarily located offshore in the South China Sea near the states of Sarawak and Sabah. These reserves have supported the development of both domestic gas-fired power generation and a large LNG export industry. Although Malaysia remains a net exporter of natural gas, analysts expect domestic production growth to slow and eventually plateau toward the end of the 2020s as mature fields decline.

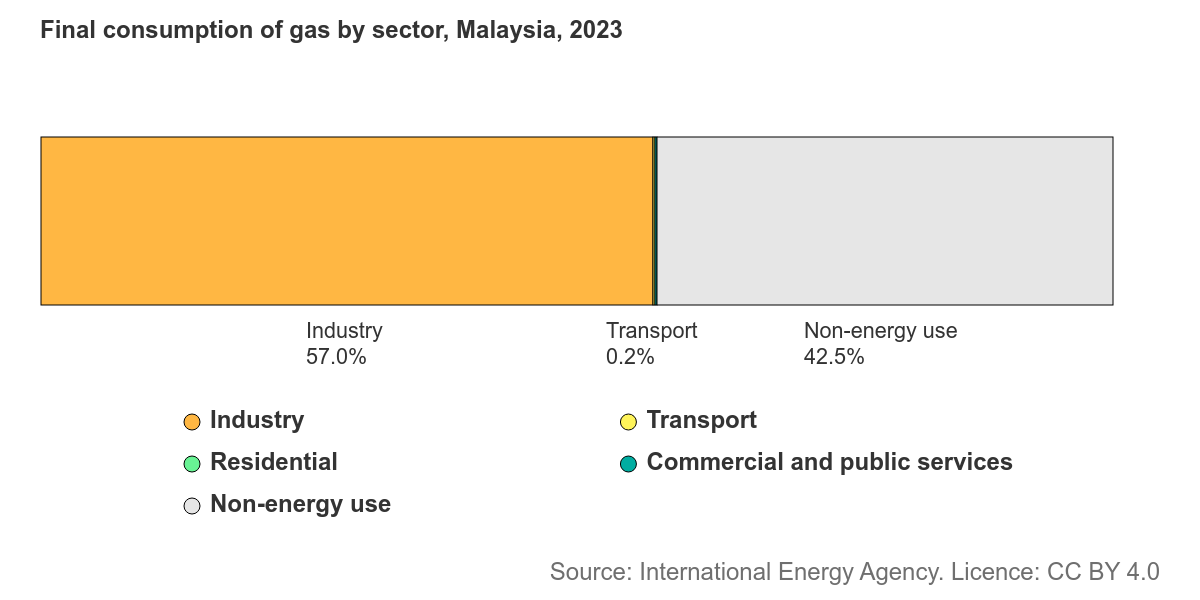
Final consumption of gas by sector in Malaysia, 2023

=== Consumption and demand ===
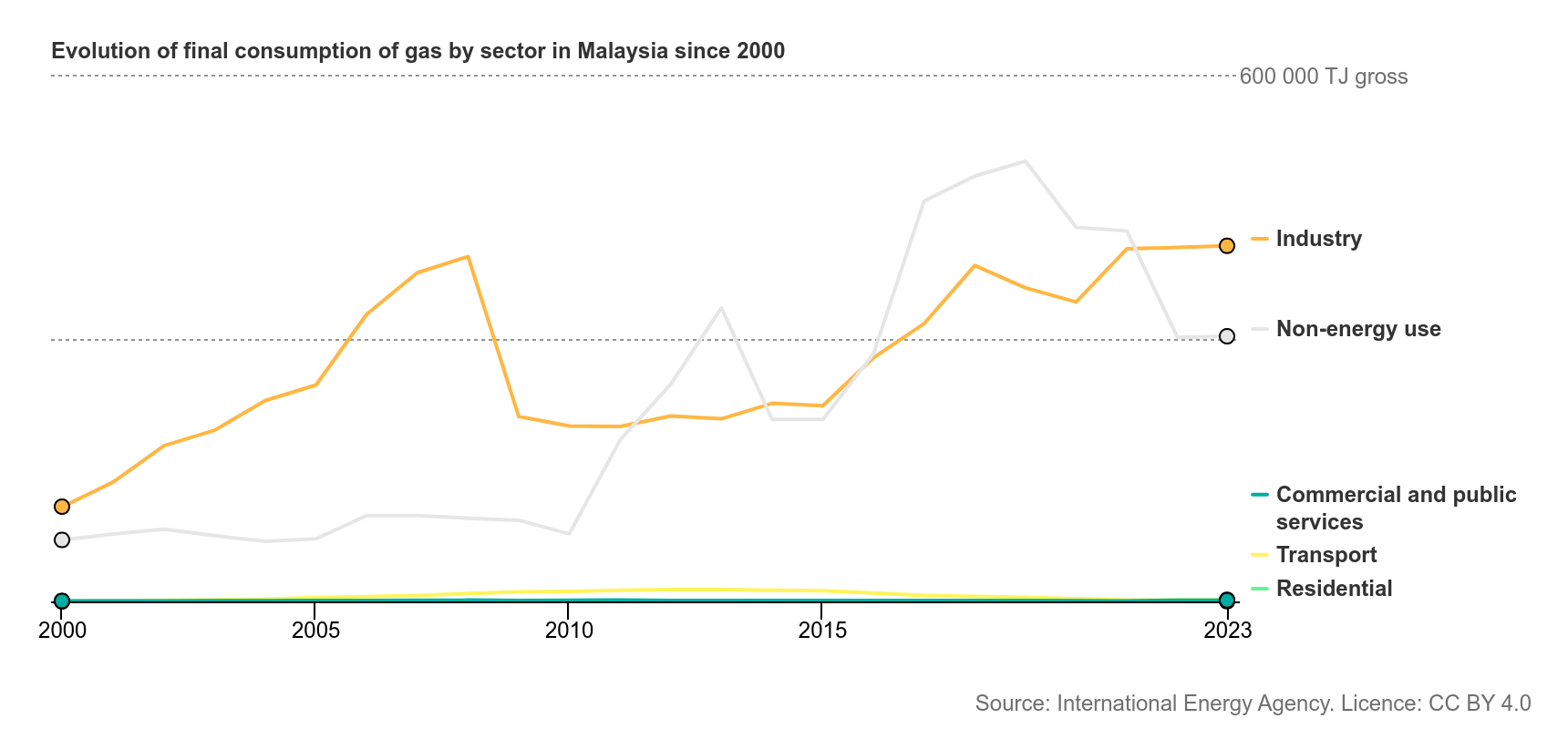
Evolution of final consumption of gas by sector in Malaysia since 2000

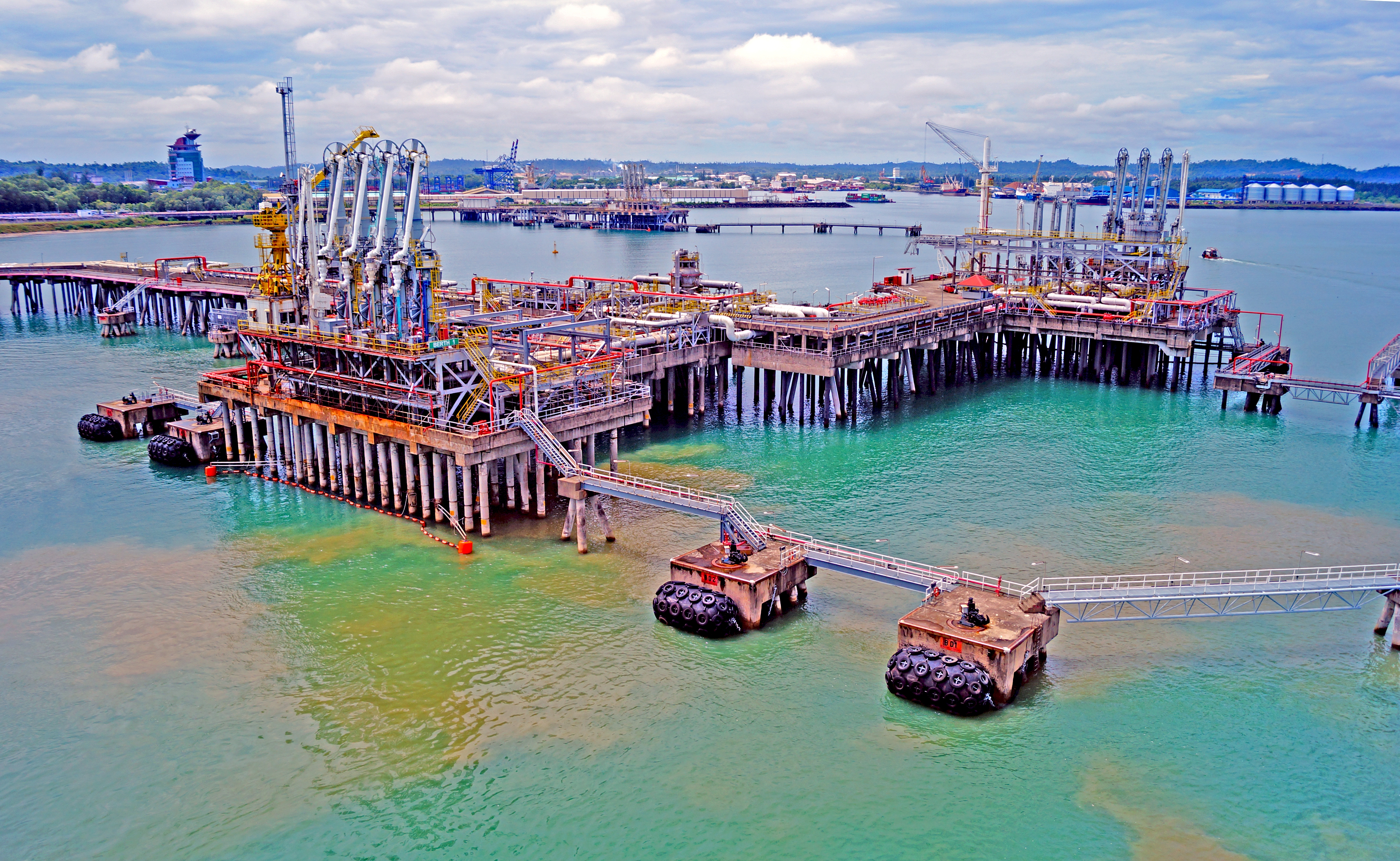
Bintulu LNG port in Sarawak

In 2023 Malaysia consumed 1.752 quadrillion Btu of natural gas, making it one of the largest consumers in Southeast Asia. Domestic demand for natural gas is driven primarily by the power sector, industrial production and petrochemical industries. Gas-fired power plants provide a substantial share of electricity generation, particularly in Peninsular Malaysia, which accounts for most of the country's electricity demand. Energy consumption has increased rapidly due to economic growth, urbanization and the expansion of energy-intensive industries such as data centers. As a result, natural gas demand in the power sector is expected to rise in coming decades.

=== Trade ===
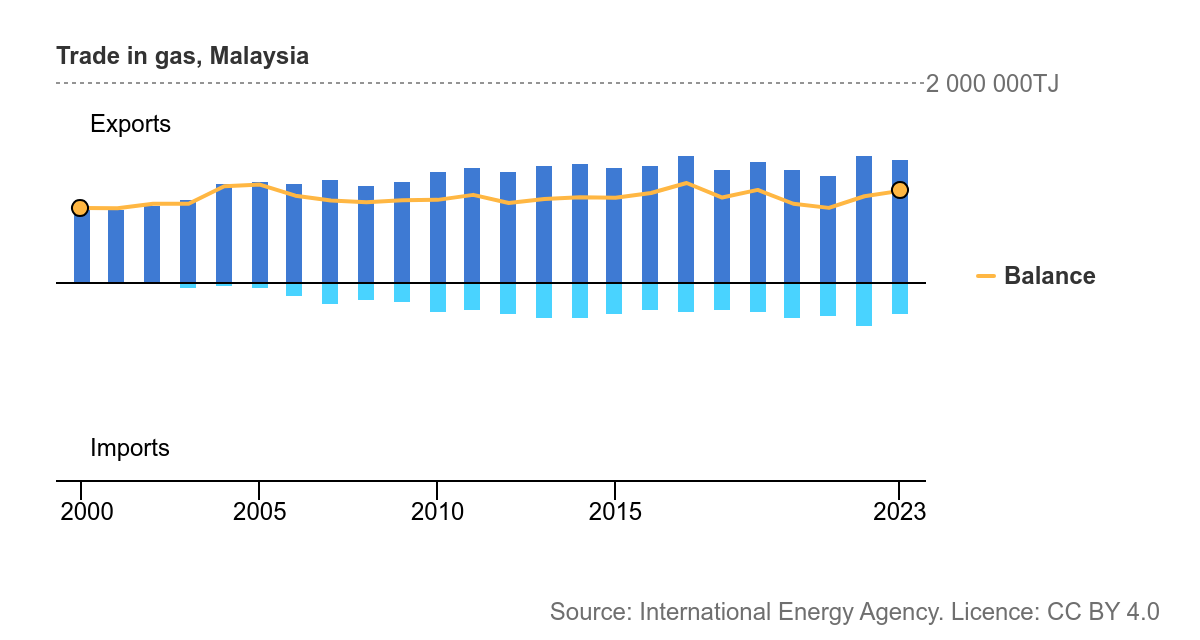
Malaysian trade in gas, 2000-2023

Malaysia is a major participant in global LNG trade, exporting a large share of its natural gas production. The country's LNG export industry is centered on the Bintulu complex in Sarawak, one of the largest LNG liquefaction facilities in the world. Malaysia supplies long-term export contracts primarily to East Asian markets such as Japan, South Korea and China. Malaysia typically exports around 25–30 million tons of LNG annually, making it in the top five leading LNG exporters globally.

However, Malaysia is shifting from an LNG exporter to importer due to the country's increasing reliance on natural gas and declining domestic reserves. Imported gas makes up around 32% of Malaysia's total energy generation and projections indicate Malaysia could become a net importer in 10 - 20 years. Malaysia has developed LNG regasification terminals in Peninsular Malaysia to allow imports when domestic supply is insufficient or when market conditions favor imported gas.

== Industry and infrastructure ==
=== Gas exploitation ===
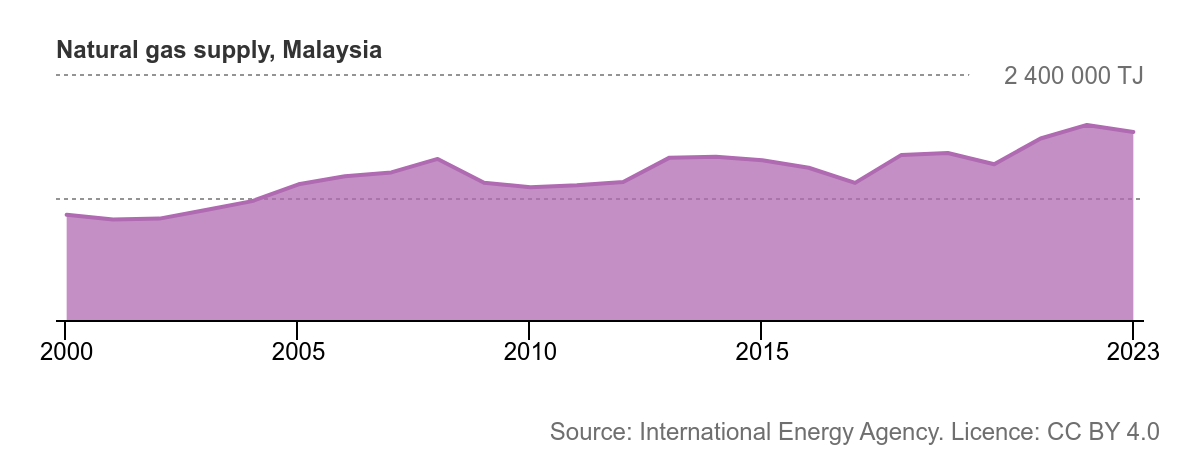
Natural gas supply in Malaysia

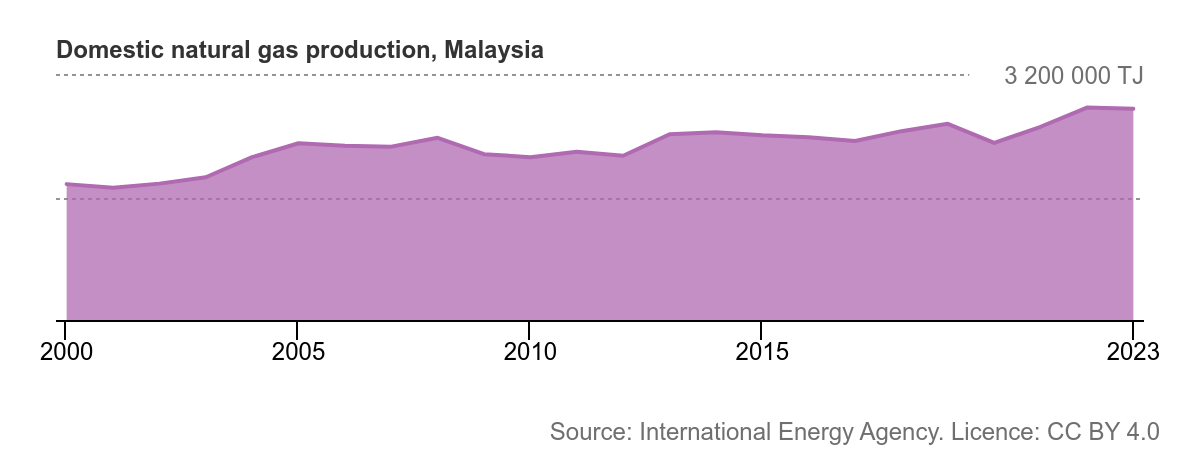
Domestic natural gas production

Natural gas extraction in Malaysia is concentrated in offshore fields and involves extensive subsea infrastructure and processing facilities including over 10,000 km of pipelines, 380 offshore platforms, and floating liquefied natural gas facilities. Production levels have fluctuated in recent years but remain among the highest in Southeast Asia. Government statistics recorded quarterly production levels of about 784 billion cubic feet of gas in late 2025.

Malaysia's natural gas industry is dominated by the state-owned oil and gas company Petroliam Nasional Berhad (Petronas), which oversees exploration, LNG production and international gas marketing. Petronas also operates several LNG production facilities and floating LNG units that allow offshore gas to be liquefied and exported.

=== Infrastructure and transport ===
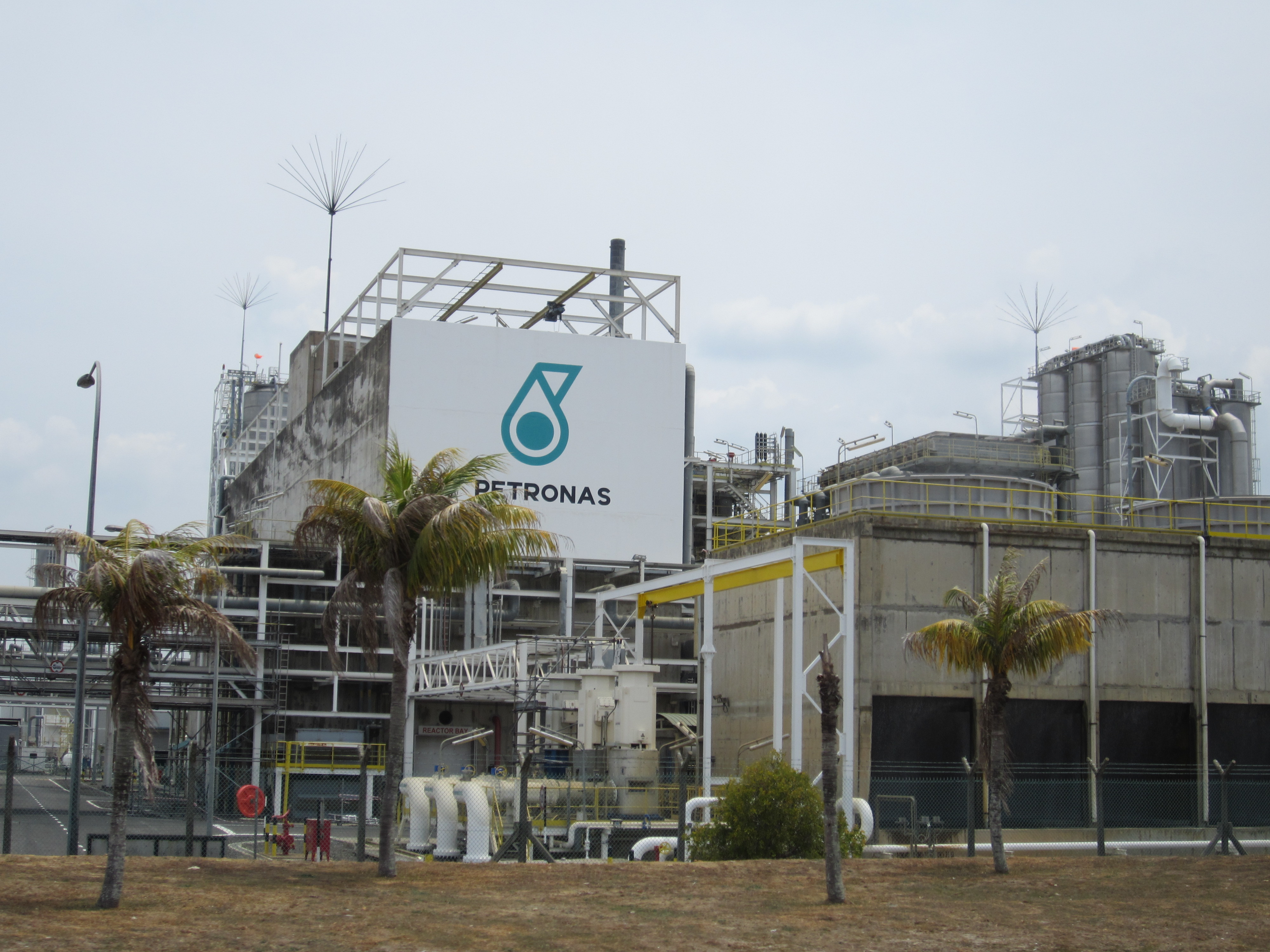
Petronas oil & gas refinary

Malaysia's gas infrastructure includes LNG liquefaction plants, gas processing facilities, pipelines and regasification terminals. Major LNG production facilities convert natural gas into liquefied form for export, while regasification terminals allow imported LNG to be converted back into pipeline gas for domestic use.

The country also operates one of the most extensive gas pipeline networks in Asia. The network connects offshore gas fields to power plants and industrial centers across Peninsular Malaysia and East Malaysia. The Peninsular Gas Utilization (PGU) project, completed in 1998, connects Malaysia with Thailand and Singapore for natural gas exports, and with Indonesia for imports.

To address geographic demand and supply disparities across the nation, Petronas has developed regasification terminals in Peninsular Malaysia to process imported natural gas.

=== Energy generation ===
Natural gas is one of the main fuels used for electricity generation in Malaysia, though coal has become the dominant fuel in recent years due to economic considerations and export priorities for domestic gas. In 2025, natural gas accounted for approximately 33% of electricity generation, while coal represented more than half of the total.

== Impacts and risks ==
=== Environment ===
Natural gas extraction, processing and combustion contribute to greenhouse gas emissions and other environmental impacts. In 2023, almost a third (31%) of Malaysia's CO2 emissions from fuel combustion were from natural gas.

Although gas combustion typically emits less carbon dioxide than coal per unit of electricity produced, the expansion of natural gas infrastructure can prolong reliance on fossil fuels and delay the deployment of renewable energy technologies. Researchers have argued that continued investment in LNG infrastructure may create long-term emissions commitments that will be barriers to Malaysia's climate goals.

Methane leakage during production and transportation also represents a significant environmental concern because methane is a potent greenhouse gas.

=== Energy security ===
Malaysia faces energy security challenges due to its heavy reliance on depleting domestic oil and gas reserves alongside growing import dependence for coal, which exposes the country to global price volatility and supply disruptions. Coal and natural gas currently dominate 81% of electricity generation, while renewables like solar and hydro make up 19%.

Updates to the National Energy Transition Roadmap (NETR) and Malaysia Renewable Energy Roadmap (MyRER), including the Solar ATAP scheme and the Corporate Renewable Energy Supply Scheme (CRESS), aim to promote solar adoption, streamline regulations, and integrate battery storage for grid stability, to enhance affordability, accessibility, and sustainability without compromising supply reliability.

=== Human rights ===
Natural gas development in Malaysia has raised human rights concerns, particularly in regions where extraction and infrastructure projects affect local communities. For example, in 2013 the Long Seridan Penan indigenous community protested against the construction of a Petronas natural gas pipeline and dam on the grounds that it would cut through their ancestral land and limit their access to drinking water.

== See also ==
- 2025 Putra Heights pipeline fire
- Gas Malaysia
- Peninsula Gas Utilisation
- Petronas
