= Natural gas in China =

Overview of natural gas use in China

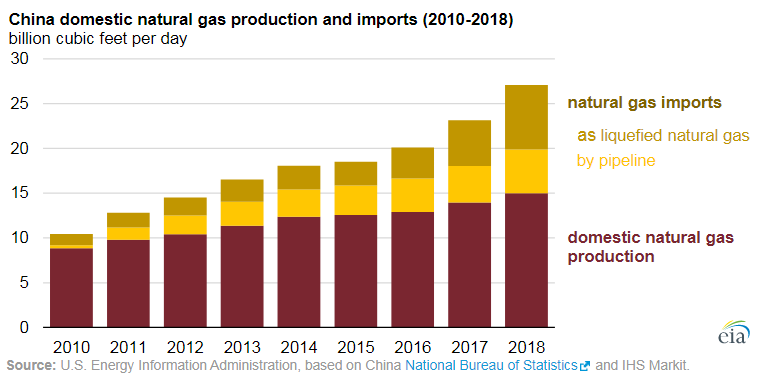
Production and import of natural gas in China, 2010–2018

Between 2009 and 2014, gas consumption, production, and imports in China have grown dramatically, with two-digit growth. According to CNPC, the installed capacity of gas-fired power plants in the country is expected to reach around 138 million-154 million kilowatts in 2025, and further grow to 261 million-308 million kilowatts by 2030.

In 2022, China significantly increased its natural gas imports from Russia, with a 54% rise to 16 billion cubic meters, largely through the Power of Siberia pipeline. This pipeline is projected to reach a capacity of 38 billion m^{3} by 2025. This increase is part of China's strategy to diversify its energy sources and enhance energy security.

== Natural gas consumption ==
Considering China's immense demand for energy, gas plays a relatively small role in its energy use, with only 5% of total energy in 2012. However, Chinese authorities see natural gas as a lower-polluting and less carbon-intensive alternative to coal, and gas consumption is increasing rapidly. Natural gas is expected to supply 15% of the nation's energy supply by 2030.

Natural gas Consumption 2011-2021 (billion cubic metres)
| 2011 | 2012 | 2013 | 2014 | 2015 | 2016 | 2017 | 2018 | 2019 | 2020 | 2021 |
| 135.2 | 150.9 | 171.9 | 188.4 | 194.7 | 209.4 | 241.3 | 283.9 | 308.4 | 336.6 | 378.7 |

China's increasing energy consumption has led to the search for new reforms in energy production. This is closely linked to the increasing dependency China has on natural gas. As China continues to grow, it will rely on more natural gas. It is estimated that 650 billion cubic meters of gas will be needed by 2050.

== Natural gas supply ==
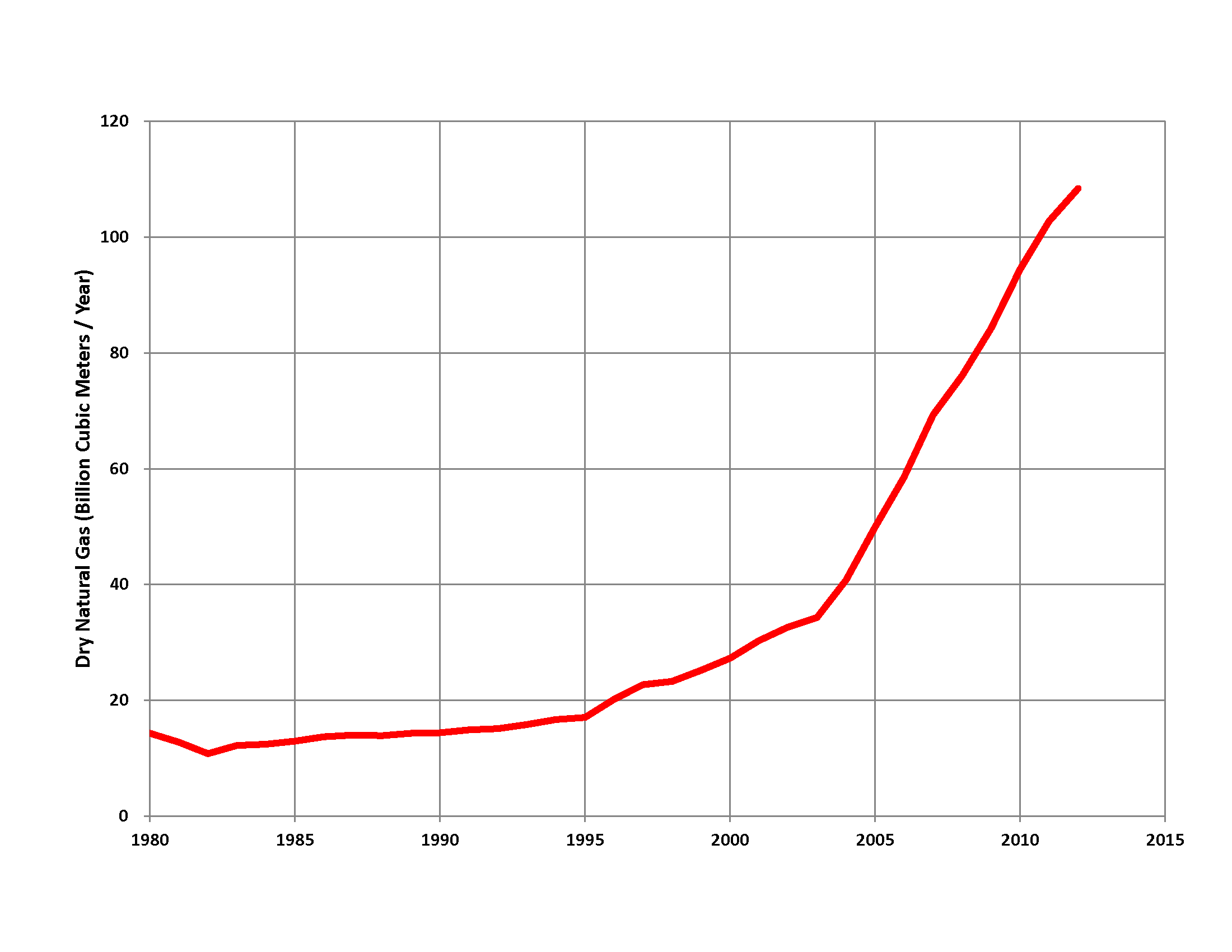
Natural gas production in China, 1980-2012

=== Production ===
China produced 112 billion cubic meters of natural gas in 2013, making it the sixth largest gas producer in the world. Gas production more than doubled over the period 2005–2013.

=== Natural gas imports ===
Despite rapidly rising natural gas production, in 2013 China imported 52 billion cubic meters of natural gas, making it the world's fifth largest gas importer. Imports increased more than tenfold in the period 2008–2013. China has worked to diversify its sources for natural gas imports.

Natural gas Production 2011-2021 (billion cubic metres)
| 2011 | 2012 | 2013 | 2014 | 2015 | 2016 | 2017 | 2018 | 2019 | 2020 | 2021 |
| 106.2 | 111.5 | 121.8 | 131.2 | 135.7 | 137.9 | 149.2 | 161.4 | 176.7 | 194.0 | 209.2 |

In 2013, China was the world's third-largest importer of LNG, behind Japan and Korea. In that year, 85% of China's LNG supply came from Australia, Indonesia, Malaysia, and Qatar.

To lessen dependence on LNG, China has built pipelines to import natural gas from Myanmar and Central Asia. In 2014, China and Russia agreed on natural gas imports via the Power of Siberia pipeline, operational since 2018. By 2022, imports from Russia to China increased by 54%, reaching 16 billion cubic meters, with the pipeline expected to reach a 38 billion m^{3} capacity by 2025.

Natural gas imports 2011-2021 (billion cubic metres)
| 2011 | 2012 | 2013 | 2014 | 2015 | 2016 | 2017 | 2018 | 2019 | 2020 | 2021 |
| 16.9 | 20.1 | 25.1 | 27.3 | 27.0 | 36.8 | 52.9 | 73.5 | 84.7 | 94.0 | 109.5 |

In 2022, China's natural gas sector experienced a moderate shift. As the world's third-largest gas market, China experienced a slight 1.2% decrease in consumption to 364.6 billion cubic meters. However, domestic gas production increased with significant investments, leading to a production of 220.1 billion m^{3}, which covered 59% of the country's demand and reduced import dependency to 41%. The year also saw infrastructure growth, particularly in LNG projects and the national gas pipeline network. Despite this, LNG imports decreased by 19.5% to 87.6 billion m^{3}, mainly due to economic factors and high spot prices. On the other hand, pipeline imports grew by 7.8%. Aligned with the "14th Five-Year Plan," the government plans to increase annual gas production to over 230 billion m^{3} by 2025, focusing on supply chain security and a green energy transition.

In May 2024, China's natural gas imports — including pipeline gas and LNG — reached a record high of 11.33 million tons due to low international gas prices. In the first five months of 2024, imports totaled 54.28 million tons, a 17.4% increase year on year, with an average price of 3504.6 yuan per ton ($9.30 per million Btu). High temperatures are expected to increase natural gas-fired power generation, maintaining China's position as the world's largest LNG importer. However, concerns exist about rising international spot LNG prices, which need to be below $10 per million British thermal unit to attract Chinese imports. China's gas consumption is projected to reach 425 billion cubic meters in 2024, potentially pushing LNG imports above 80 million tons. New LNG import terminals coming online later in 2024 will add around 47 million tons per year of capacity, bringing the total to 163 million tons per year, with five new terminals increasing the total to 33.

== Natural gas as a transitionary fuel ==
In its goal to achieve net-zero carbon emissions, China is increasingly using natural gas as a cleaner alternative to other fossil fuels. Despite this, it faces several challenges and obstacles in implementing gas alternatives.

=== Policy ===
China's 14th Five-Year Plan on Modern Energy System Planning is a policy initiative aimed at addressing global climate governance. It aims to enhance national energy security while facilitating a low-carbon transformation in both the energy and industry sectors. The primary goals of the plan include achieving carbon peaking by 2030 and carbon neutrality by 2060, emphasizing the regulating role of coal, and increasing national production of natural gas. Additionally, the plan seeks to assist developing nations in adopting green energy while refraining from endorsing new overseas coal power initiatives, underscoring China's commitment to promoting green energy and reducing global carbon emissions. China's current stance on natural gas is to increase its use and production as part of its efforts to reduce greenhouse gas emissions and improve air quality.In China's latest energy development plan, it expect natural gas to make up 10% of total energy consumption by 2020 and 15% by 2050. As of 2018, China has found 509 natural gas fields within its borders, potentially increasing its future natural gas output as well. China announced plans in 2017 to develop a carbon trading system that would limit emissions of fossil fuels, including natural gas, but no specifics have been yet provided.

=== Transition ===
China's energy development plan also emphasized the importance of increasing natural gas infrastructure, such as increasing the amount of natural gas piping by 40,000 km. Coal is still expected to make a much greater percentage of energy consumption now and in the future than natural gas because of coal's abundance in China. Given the environmental impact of coal, it is possible that China will want to shift its focus on coal towards other energy sources. One such alternative is natural gas, which leaves half of the carbon footprint as coal. When and how China might transition away from coal more towards natural gas, if it chooses to do so, is unclear.

China increased its imports of natural gas from Russia by twice last year's amount. This is equivalent to about 10 percent of China's current natural gas usage. However, there is much greater natural gas demand inside China than there is production. This is mainly a result that China has relatively few natural gas reservoirs.

As such, China imports the majority of its gas, mainly using onshore pipelines and liquid natural gas. Liquid natural gas (LNG) imports in particularly have been used to satisfy this demand, increasing by over 39 percent in 2017 to 499*10^8 m^3 of natural gas being imported. In the future, LNG will continue to play an integral role in satisfying China's demand for natural gas.

=== Challenges ===
China also faces many challenges on its way to increase natural gas production, such as the high investment costs required. Low commodity prices for oil have resulted in less investment by oil companies in natural gas development. Additionally, since China has few natural gas resources, meaning it relies heavily on importing natural gas, which may prove to be an obstacle in shifting away from coal towards natural gas.

=== Increasing demand ===
Chinese demand for natural gas has been increasing over the past few decades until the COVID-19 pandemic disrupted international energy markets, especially in the case of China due to its reduced consumption during its lockdown. The natural gas demand in China witnessed a notable decline in 2022, marking a historic shift in consumption patterns. According to data provided by the National Energy Administration, the gas demand figure for the year was approximately 1.4% lower than the previous year's demand, which stood at a significant 369 billion cubic meters in 2021. This decline represents the first-ever year-on-year decrease in Chinese gas demand. The change in trend signifies a significant turning point in the country's energy landscape and underscores the influence of diverse factors on China's consumption of natural gas. Despite the recent decline in Chinese natural gas demand, there are expectations of continued growth, albeit at a slower pace compared to historic levels. It is anticipated that the demand will increase by approximately 6% year-on-year. This growth can be attributed, in part, to the implementation of new contracts that are anticipated to bolster the growth of liquefied natural gas (LNG) imports. These contracts are expected to play a crucial role in supporting China's expanding natural gas market and contribute to meeting the country's energy needs in the coming years. LNG imports are continuing to play a more important role in China's diversification of energy and its phasing out of coal as demand for LNG increases. The country's LNG receiving capacity is projected to increase to 130 million mt/year by 2023. Additionally, around nine new LNG term contracts are scheduled to begin deliveries in 2023, offsetting expiring short-term contracts. China's LNG imports are expected to rise, driven by the Power of Siberia pipeline imports as well as new term contracts, including increasing imports from the United States. China's LNG imports are estimated to reach approximately 89.8 Bcm in 2023. The country aims to secure more long-term contracts to support its long-term demand growth and reduce exposure to spot market price volatility.

=== Trade ===
China's trade landscape is evolving. China is making plans to change the trading of natural gas from a very regulated system to a market pricing system. Given the shortage of natural gas China faces, it wants to encourage natural gas companies to produce more natural gas using market pricing. U.S. suppliers are expected to increase its supply of natural gas to China, which is crucial for the natural gas industry to expand exports.

Total Inter-regional Trade of Natural Gas 2011-2021 (billion cubic metres)
| 2011 | 2012 | 2013 | 2014 | 2015 | 2016 | 2017 | 2018 | 2019 | 2020 | 2021 |
| 30.5 | 40.8 | 51.5 | 57.5 | 59.4 | 73.5 | 92.8 | 121.3 | 132.5 | 139.1 | 162.7 |

The U.S. is China's biggest supplier of natural gas. One of the largest natural gas deals is between China's Sinopec and U.S. Natural Global LNG, which will provide 194 billion ft^3 of natural gas every year to China for 20 years. China has also increased taxes on natural gas being imported from the United States. Current Chinese policy is encouraging natural gas to be obtained from a wide range of sources across the globe to protect energy supplies, which includes Russia. As China expands its natural gas consumption with trade, research has shown that doing so will decrease energy poverty.

== See also ==
- Petroleum industry in China
- Shale gas in China
