= List of countries by natural gas consumption =

This is a list of countries by annual natural gas consumption. For informational purposes, several non-sovereign entities are also included in this list. Countries with no natural gas consumption are not included.

Country/Region	Natural gas consumption (million m^{3}/year)	Year
World	4,232,000	2024
United States	937,000	2024
Russia	500,000	2024
China	425,000	2024
Iran	264,000	2024
Canada	138,000	2024
Saudi Arabia	123,000	2024
Mexico	98,000	2024
Japan	89,000	2024
Germany	78,000	2024
United Arab Emirates	72,000	2024
India	71,000	2024
United Kingdom	63,000	2024
Italy	63,000	2024
South Korea	62,000	2024
Egypt	60,000	2024
Turkey	53,000	2024
Algeria	53,000	2024
Uzbekistan	52,000	2024
Indonesia	50,000	2024
Australia	49,000	2024
Argentina	47,000	2024
Qatar	47,000	2024
Malaysia	47,000	2024
Thailand	45,000	2024
Turkmenistan	43,000	2024
Bangladesh	37,000	2024
Pakistan	34,000	2024
Netherlands	32,000	2024
France	31,000	2024
Brazil	30,000	2024
Oman	30,000	2024
Taiwan	29,000	2024
Spain	28,000	2024
Kuwait	28,000	2024
Venezuela	25,000	2024
Kazakhstan	25,000	2024
Poland	22,000	2024
Ukraine	21,000	2024
Nigeria	20,000	2024
Bahrain	19,000	2024
Iraq	18,000	2024
Trinidad and Tobago	16,000	2024
Belarus	15,000	2024
Belgium	14,000	2024
Singapore	14,000	2024
Israel	14,000	2024
Colombia	12,000	2024
Azerbaijan	11,000	2024
Libya	11,000	2024
Romania	9,200	2024
Peru	9,200	2024
Hungary	8,500	2024
Austria	6,900	2024
Vietnam	6,800	2024
Czechia	6,700	2024
Chile	6,300	2024
Greece	6,100	2024
Hong Kong	5,500	2024
Tunisia	5,400	2024
Ireland	5,100	2024
Jordan	4,900	2024
Bolivia	4,800	2024
Norway	4,700	2024
Slovakia	4,400	2024
Ghana	4,200	2024
Myanmar	4,000	2024
South Africa	3,900	2024
Brunei	3,900	2024
Syria	3,700	2024
Portugal	3,600	2024
New Zealand	3,300	2024
Philippines	3,300	2024
Georgia	3,300	2024
Switzerland	3,000	2024
Serbia	2,900	2024
Bulgaria	2,700	2024
Armenia	2,700	2024
Côte d'Ivoire	2,700	2024
Dominican Republic	2,600	2024
Equatorial Guinea	2,500	2024
Puerto Rico	2,500	2024
Denmark	2,300	2024
Croatia	2,300	2024
Moldova	2,200	2024
Tanzania	2,000	2024
Mozambique	1,900	2024
Lithuania	1,800	2024
Finland	1,700	2024
Republic of the Congo	1,400	2024
Angola	1,200	2024
Cuba	1,000	2024
Sweden	900	2024
Morocco	900	2024
Slovenia	900	2024
Latvia	800	2024
Jamaica	700	2024
Luxembourg	600	2024
Kyrgyzstan	600	2024
Cameroon	600	2024
Panama	600	2024
El Salvador	500	2024
Gabon	500	2024
Papua New Guinea	400	2024
Malta	400	2024
Ecuador	300	2024
Estonia	300	2024
North Macedonia	300	2024
Benin	200	2024
Bosnia and Herzegovina	200	2024
Macau	200	2024
Afghanistan	146.6	2015 est.
Togo	100	2024
Tajikistan	100	2024
Senegal	60	2015 est.
Uruguay	40	2015 est.
Albania	35	2015 est.
Barbados	12.7	2015 est.
