= List of countries by charitable donation =

The following list of countries by charitable donation shows the total charitable donations from individuals within the nation, as a percentage of the nation's GDP. The figures were published in February 2016 by the Charities Aid Foundation (CAF) in its report titled Gross Domestic Philanthropy. The report only considers the 24 countries about which CAF was able to collect comprehensive data.

Country	Inflated GDP (US$2005, billions)	Amount given (USD, billions)	Charitable giving (% of GDP)
United States	17,936.0	258.5	1.44
New Zealand	142.7	1.1	0.79
Canada	1,609.0	12.4	0.77
United Kingdom	3,203.6	17.4	0.54
South Korea	1,369.9	6.9	0.50
Singapore	252.5	1.0	0.39
India	1,062.5	4.0	0.37
Russia	1,211.0	4.2	0.34
Italy	2,114.4	6.4	0.30
Netherlands	859.8	2.6	0.30
Australia	994.4	2.3	0.23
Ireland	273.3	0.6	0.22
Germany	3,894.4	6.6	0.17
Sweden	520.5	0.9	0.16
Austria	424.2	0.6	0.14
Finland	253.4	0.3	0.13
Japan	5,793.6	7.0	0.12
France	2,692.2	3.0	0.11
Norway	418.6	0.5	0.11
Switzerland	569.3	0.5	0.09
Spain	1,441.0	0.7	0.05
Czech Republic	182.3	0.1	0.04
Mexico	1,064.5	0.3	0.03
China	6,388.2	1.9	0.03

== See also ==
- List of development aid country donors
- List of countries by Official Development Assistance received
