= Lumby =

Lumby may refer to:

== Placenames ==
- Lumby, British Columbia, a community in the Canadian province of British Columbia
  - Lumby Junction, British Columbia, a railroad junction
- Lumby, Denmark, a village near Odense Airport on Funen, Denmark
- Lumby, North Yorkshire, a village in England

== People ==
- Lumby (surname)
