= Gary Lumby =

British banker (born 1958)

- Born: 1958 (age 67–68)
- Occupations: Banker; director
- Spouse: Hayley Lumby

Gary Lumby MBE FCIBS (born 1958) is a British banker and president of the Leeds Chamber of Commerce. He is also a business mentor and non-executive director for a number of SMEs. He is a Fellow of the Chartered Institute of Bankers in Scotland and was the director of small business banking for Yorkshire Bank and Clydesdale Bank.

In 2008, he was presented with an MBE by Prince Charles in recognition of his services to the finance industry.

== Early years and Yorkshire Bank ==
Gary Lumby started as a cashier in Billingham, Teesside, with Barclays Bank in 1976. In 1995, he was appointed Head of SME Banking for the North East and Cumbria at Barclays Bank. He joined Yorkshire Bank in 1998 as regional business manager for the North East. In March 2002, he was promoted to head of business banking for Yorkshire and the North East, and later promoted to head of retail banking at Yorkshire Bank. During his later role as UK director of SME banking for Yorkshire Bank and Clydesdale Bank, he endorsed the promotion of the Geared for Giving charity initiative co-created by Scottish entrepreneur Duncan Bannatyne. Gary Lumby left Yorkshire Bank in 2011.

== Directorships ==
Gary Lumby sits on the board and acts as a non-executive director for several SMEs primarily located in the Yorkshire and North East regions of the UK. In January 2012, Lumby was announced as the non-executive director of Erimus Insurance Brokers (formerly Teesside Insurance).

He is involved in two businesses with his wife, Hayley Lumby: he is the executive director of SE Decorators Ltd. and a partner at Omkara Beauty Salon, which was opened on 21 April 2012 by Dragons' Den presenter Duncan Bannatyne.

He is a non-executive director at Walsh Taylor Business Support Group. He is a non-executive director of Leeds construction business Howard Civil Engineering, Active Financial Services, and Hellens Residential Ltd. He is the chairman of the rewards solution company Simply Thank You. He is also NED for Whitecap Consulting the Leeds-based Strategic Marketing and Commercial Consultancy business as New Home Finder.com and Active Chartered Financial Planners Ltd. Lumby is the managing director of Focus on Success, a management consultancy business. He also sits on the investment panel for the Let's Grow Regional Growth Fund.
