= List of countries by percentage of population living in poverty =

Countries ranked by poverty rate

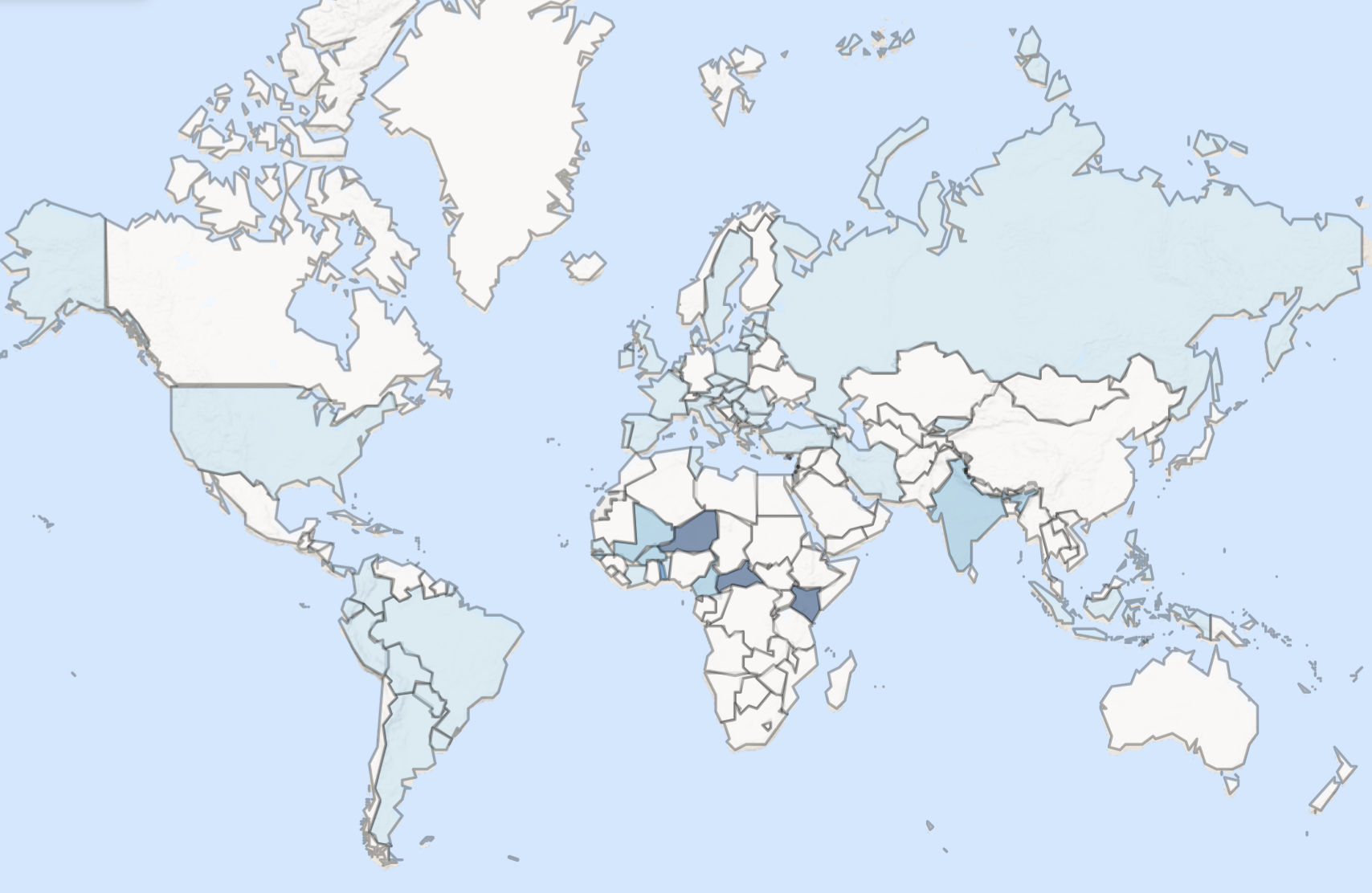
Global map of countries by poverty headcount ratio at $2.15 a day (2017 PPP) (% of population), 2021

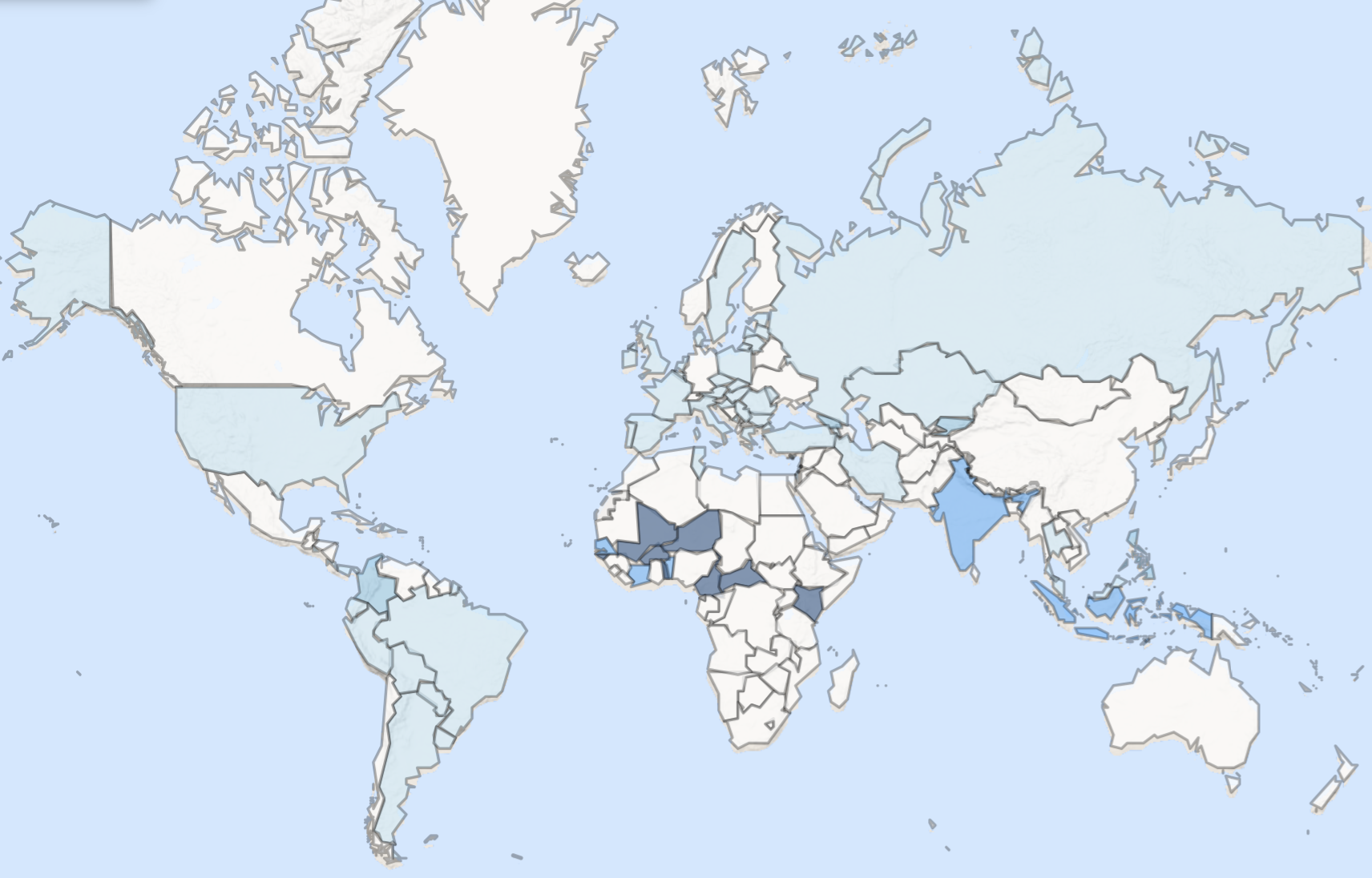
Global map of countries by poverty headcount ratio at $3.65 a day (2017 PPP) (% of population), 2021

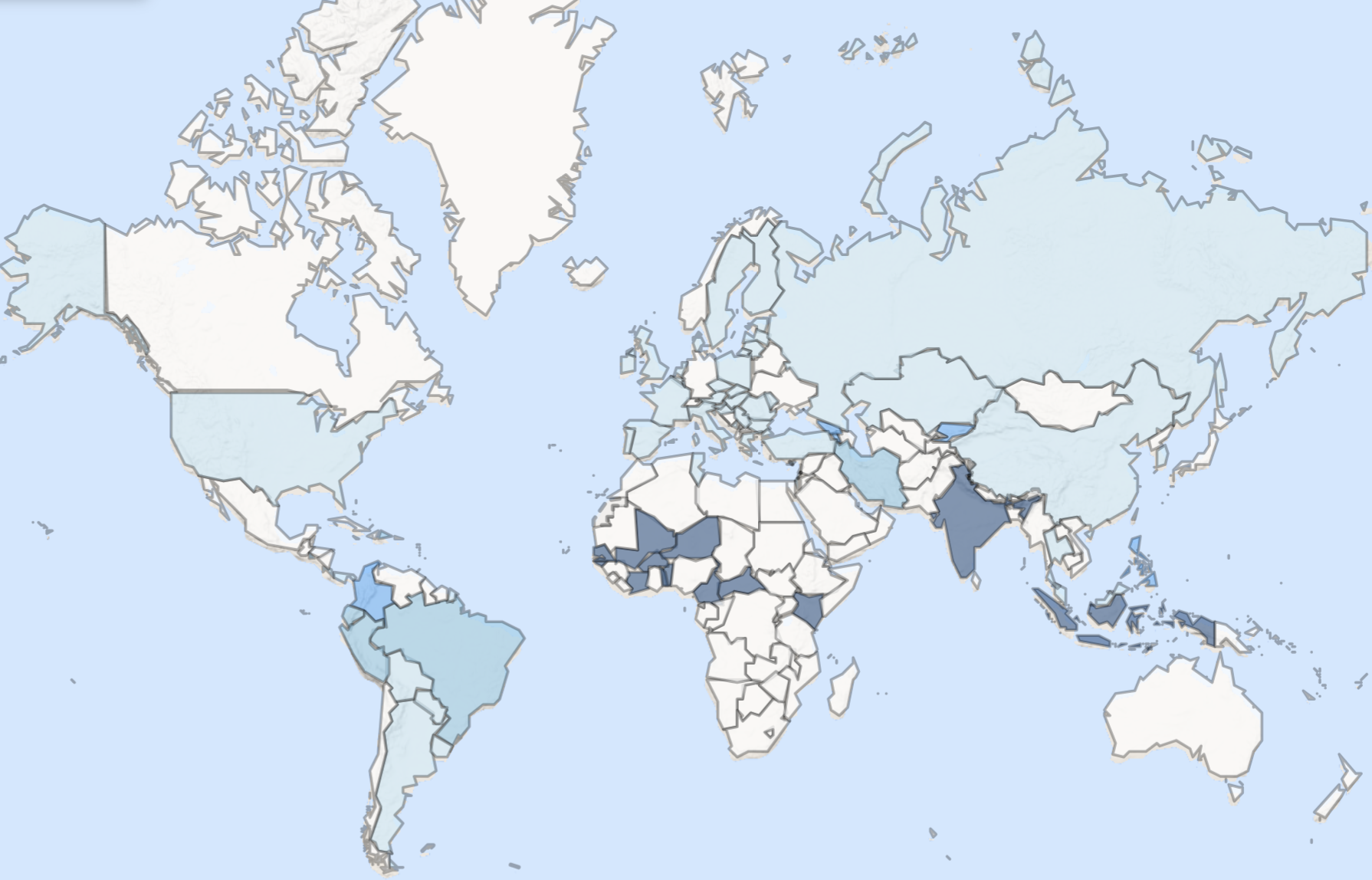
Global map of countries by poverty headcount ratio at $6.85 a day (2017 PPP) (% of population), 2021

This is a list of countries and territories by percentage of population living in poverty, as recorded by the World Bank and International Labour Organization.

Poverty is about not having enough money to meet basic needs including food, clothing and shelter. There are many working definitions of "poverty", with considerable debate on the most accurate definition of the term.

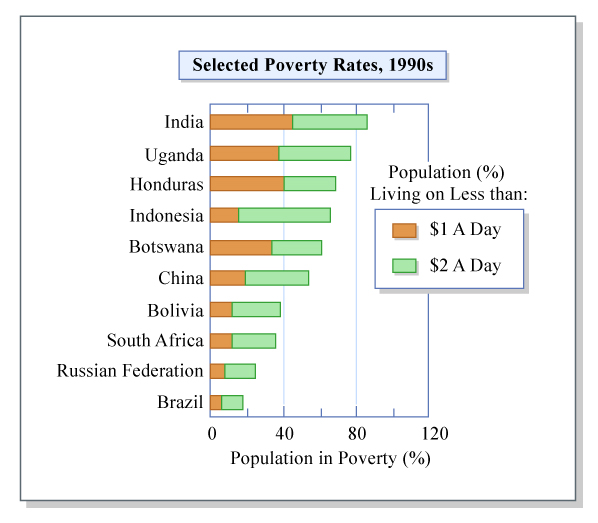
Graph of selected poverty rates in the 1990s.

Lack of income security, economic stability and the predictability of one's continued means to meet basic needs all serve as absolute indicators of poverty. Poverty may therefore also be defined as the economic condition of lacking predictable and stable means of meeting basic life needs.

As a result of the adoption of the 2017 PPPs, the global poverty lines have been revised in 2022: The international poverty line, used to define extreme global poverty, was revised to US$2.15 from US$1.90. Poverty lines for other sets of countries have also been revised upwards. The poverty line for lower middle-income countries (LMICs) has moved to US$3.65 from US$3.20, while the poverty line for upper middle-income countries (UMICs) has moved to US$6.85 from US$5.50.

The first table lists countries by the percentage of their population with an income of less than $2.15 (the extreme poverty line), $3.65 and $6.85 US dollars a day in 2017 international PPP prices. The data is from the most recent year available from the World Bank API.

As differences in price levels across the world evolve, the global poverty line has to be periodically updated to reflect these changes. The World Bank updated the global poverty lines in September 2022. The decision follows the release in 2020 of new purchasing power parities (PPPs)—the main data used to convert different currencies into a common, comparable unit and account for price differences across countries. The new extreme poverty line of $2.15 per person per day is based on 2017 PPPs. This means that anyone living on less than $2.15 a day is considered to be living in extreme poverty. About 692 million people globally were in this situation in 2024.

The second table lists countries by the percentage of the population living below the national poverty line—the poverty line deemed appropriate for a country by its authorities. National estimates are based on population-weighted subgroup estimates from household surveys.

Definitions of the poverty line vary considerably among nations. For example, rich nations generally employ more generous standards of poverty than poor nations. Even among rich nations, the standards differ greatly. Thus, the numbers are not comparable among countries. Even when nations do use the same method, some issues may remain.

According to the World Bank, "Poverty headcount ratio at a defined value a day is the percentage of the population living on less than that value a day at 2017 purchasing power adjusted prices. As a result of revisions in PPP exchange rates, poverty rates for individual countries cannot be compared with poverty rates reported in earlier editions." "National poverty headcount ratio is the percentage of the population living below the national poverty line(s). National estimates are based on population-weighted subgroup estimates from household surveys."

A country may have a unique national poverty line or separate poverty lines for rural and urban areas, or for different geographic areas to reflect differences in the cost of living or sometimes to reflect differences in diets and consumption baskets. National poverty lines reflect local perceptions of the level and composition of consumption or income needed to be non-poor. The perceived boundary between poor and non-poor typically rises with the average income of a country and thus does not provide a uniform measure for comparing poverty rates across countries. Almost all national poverty lines in developing economies are anchored to the cost of a food bundle - based on the prevailing national diet of the poor - that provides adequate nutrition for good health and normal activity, plus an allowance for nonfood spending.

The third table lists countries by the percentage of the working population with an income of less than $2.15 (the extreme poverty line), and up to $3.65 a day (the moderate poverty line). The data is from the most recent year available from ILOSTAT, the International Labour Organization database.

According to International Labour Organization, "the working poor are employed people who live in households that fall below an accepted poverty line. While poverty in the developed world is often associated with unemployment, the extreme poverty that exists throughout much of the developing world is largely a problem of employed persons in these societies. For these poor workers, the problem is typically one of employment quality. Reducing poverty in line with the SDGs therefore necessitates boosting the employment opportunities and incomes of the working poor – those people who are employed, but who are nevertheless unable to lift themselves and their families above the poverty threshold."

== Percentage of population living below global poverty lines ==
Percentage of population (including non-citizens) living on less than $3.00, $4.20 and $8.30 a day in 2021 international PPP dollars as per the World Bank. Sorting is alphabetical by country code, according to ISO 3166-1 alpha-3.

Country/Territory	Region	World Bank Income group (2025)	Poverty headcount ratio (2021 PPP) at			Year
Country/Territory	Region	World Bank Income group (2025)	$3.00 a day	$4.20 a day	$8.30 a day	Year
Aruba	Latin America & Caribbean	High	N/A			
Afghanistan	Middle East, North Africa, Afghanistan & Pakistan	Low	N/A			
Angola	Sub-Saharan Africa	Lower middle	39.3%	53.7%	80%	2018
Albania	Europe & Central Asia	Upper middle	0.3%	2.1%	19.9%	2020
Andorra	Europe & Central Asia	High	N/A			
United Arab Emirates	Middle East, North Africa, Afghanistan & Pakistan	High	0%	0%	0.6%	2018
Argentina	Latin America & Caribbean	Upper middle	1%	2.8%	15.2%	2024
Armenia	Europe & Central Asia	Upper middle	1.9%	8.4%	56.9%	2023
American Samoa	East Asia & Pacific	High	N/A			
Antigua and Barbuda	Latin America & Caribbean	High	N/A			
Australia	East Asia & Pacific	High	1%	1%	1.5%	2020
Austria	Europe & Central Asia	High	0.5%	0.6%	1%	2023
Azerbaijan	Europe & Central Asia	Upper middle	N/A			
Burundi	Sub-Saharan Africa	Low	74.2%	87.2%	97.4%	2020
Belgium	Europe & Central Asia	High	0.1%	0.1%	0.3%	2023
Benin	Sub-Saharan Africa	Lower middle	27.2%	50%	86.5%	2021
Burkina Faso	Sub-Saharan Africa	Low	42.1%	64.6%	90.4%	2021
Bangladesh	South Asia	Lower middle	5.9%	20.5%	71.5%	2022
Bulgaria	Europe & Central Asia	High	1%	1.6%	4.4%	2023
Bahrain	Middle East, North Africa, Afghanistan & Pakistan	High	N/A			
Bahamas	Latin America & Caribbean	High	N/A			
Bosnia and Herzegovina	Europe & Central Asia	Upper middle	N/A			
Belarus	Europe & Central Asia	Upper middle	0%	0.1%	2.6%	2020
Belize	Latin America & Caribbean	Upper middle	1%	4%	19.7%	2018
Bermuda	North America	High	N/A			
Bolivia	Latin America & Caribbean	Lower middle	2.8%	5.1%	16.5%	2023
Brazil	Latin America & Caribbean	Upper middle	3.8%	7.5%	23.4%	2023
Barbados	Latin America & Caribbean	High	N/A			
Brunei	East Asia & Pacific	High	N/A			
Bhutan	South Asia	Lower middle	0%	0.5%	10.1%	2022
Botswana	Sub-Saharan Africa	Upper middle	N/A			
Central African Republic	Sub-Saharan Africa	Low	71.6%	83.9%	96.1%	2021
Canada	North America	High	0.2%	0.2%	0.5%	2021
Switzerland	Europe & Central Asia	High	0.2%	0.2%	0.3%	2022
Chile	Latin America & Caribbean	High	0.5%	0.9%	5.7%	2022
China	East Asia & Pacific	Upper middle	0%	0.5%	21.5%	2022
Ivory Coast	Sub-Saharan Africa	Lower middle	20.9%	41.7%	80.9%	2021
Cameroon	Sub-Saharan Africa	Lower middle	26.7%	41.3%	74%	2021
Democratic Republic of the Congo	Sub-Saharan Africa	Low	85.3%	92.5%	98%	2020
Republic of the Congo	Sub-Saharan Africa	Lower middle	N/A			
Colombia	Latin America & Caribbean	Upper middle	7.7%	13.9%	37.6%	2023
Comoros	Sub-Saharan Africa	Lower middle	N/A			
Cape Verde	Sub-Saharan Africa	Upper middle	N/A			
Costa Rica	Latin America & Caribbean	High	1.3%	2.6%	12.6%	2024
Cuba	Latin America & Caribbean	Upper middle	N/A			
Curaçao	Latin America & Caribbean	High	N/A			
Cayman Islands	Latin America & Caribbean	High	N/A			
Cyprus	Europe & Central Asia	High	0%	0%	0.1%	2023
Czech Republic	Europe & Central Asia	High	0%	0%	0.8%	2023
Germany	Europe & Central Asia	High	0.2%	0.2%	0.5%	2020
Djibouti	Middle East, North Africa, Afghanistan & Pakistan	Lower middle	25.4%	43.7%	80.8%	2017
Dominica	Latin America & Caribbean	Upper middle	N/A			
Denmark	Europe & Central Asia	High	0.4%	0.4%	0.6%	2023
Dominican Republic	Latin America & Caribbean	Upper middle	0.8%	2%	14%	2024
Algeria	Middle East, North Africa, Afghanistan & Pakistan	Upper middle	N/A			
Ecuador	Latin America & Caribbean	Upper middle	7.3%	12.1%	32.6%	2024
Egypt	Middle East, North Africa, Afghanistan & Pakistan	Lower middle	1.4%	7.1%	58.5%	2021
Eritrea	Sub-Saharan Africa	Low	N/A			
Spain	Europe & Central Asia	High	0.8%	1%	2.3%	2023
Estonia	Europe & Central Asia	High	0.3%	0.6%	1.3%	2023
Ethiopia	Sub-Saharan Africa		38.6%	63.7%	93.5%	2021
Finland	Europe & Central Asia	High	0.2%	0.2%	0.4%	2023
Fiji	East Asia & Pacific	Upper middle	4.7%	15.1%	61.3%	2019
France	Europe & Central Asia	High	0.1%	0.1%	0.3%	2023
Faroe Islands	Europe & Central Asia	High	N/A			
Federated States of Micronesia	East Asia & Pacific	Lower middle	N/A			
Gabon	Sub-Saharan Africa	Upper middle	3.8%	8%	32.9%	2017
United Kingdom	Europe & Central Asia	High	0.5%	0.5%	1%	2021
Georgia	Europe & Central Asia	Upper middle	4.2%	11%	45.6%	2024
Ghana	Sub-Saharan Africa	Lower middle	N/A			
Gibraltar	Europe & Central Asia	High	N/A			
Guinea	Sub-Saharan Africa	Lower middle	11.7%	29.2%	76.6%	2018
Gambia	Sub-Saharan Africa	Low	22%	40.2%	78.2%	2020
Guinea-Bissau	Sub-Saharan Africa	Low	39.9%	62.1%	91.4%	2021
Equatorial Guinea	Sub-Saharan Africa	Upper middle	8.8%	21.5%	58.1%	2022
Greece	Europe & Central Asia	High	0.6%	0.8%	3.2%	2023
Grenada	Latin America & Caribbean	Upper middle	0.8%	2.9%	19.6%	2018
Greenland	Europe & Central Asia	High	N/A			
Guatemala	Latin America & Caribbean	Upper middle	9.7%	17.6%	47.3%	2023
Guam	East Asia & Pacific	High	N/A			
Guyana	Latin America & Caribbean	High	N/A			
Hong Kong	East Asia & Pacific	High	N/A			
Honduras	Latin America & Caribbean	Lower middle	15.7%	23.5%	49.8%	2024
Croatia	Europe & Central Asia	High	0.3%	0.6%	2%	2023
Haiti	Latin America & Caribbean	Lower middle	N/A			
Hungary	Europe & Central Asia	High	0.9%	1.8%	4.9%	2017
Indonesia	East Asia & Pacific	Upper middle	5.4%	19.9%	68.3%	2024
Isle of Man	Europe & Central Asia	High	N/A			
India	South Asia	Lower middle	5.3%	23.9%	82.1%	2022
Ireland	Europe & Central Asia	High	0.1%	0.1%	0.3%	2023
Iran	Middle East, North Africa, Afghanistan & Pakistan	Upper middle	2.5%	7.5%	36%	2023
Iraq	Middle East, North Africa, Afghanistan & Pakistan	Upper middle	0.5%	2.4%	28%	2023
Iceland	Europe & Central Asia	High	0.1%	0.1%	0.4%	2019
Israel	Middle East, North Africa, Afghanistan & Pakistan	High	0.7%	1%	4.2%	2021
Italy	Europe & Central Asia	High	0.9%	1%	1.9%	2023
Jamaica	Latin America & Caribbean	Upper middle	1.4%	5.1%	22.9%	2021
Jordan	Middle East, North Africa, Afghanistan & Pakistan	Lower middle	N/A			
Japan	East Asia & Pacific	High	1.2%	1.5%	3.2%	2020
Kazakhstan	Europe & Central Asia	Upper middle	0%	0.3%	15.2%	2021
Kenya	Sub-Saharan Africa	Lower middle	46.9%	67%	90.9%	2022
Kyrgyzstan	Europe & Central Asia	Lower middle	2.7%	16.4%	72.1%	2023
Cambodia	East Asia & Pacific	Lower middle	N/A			
Kiribati	East Asia & Pacific	Lower middle	6.1%	22%	74.9%	2019
Saint Kitts and Nevis	Latin America & Caribbean	High	N/A			
South Korea	East Asia & Pacific	High	0.2%	0.2%	0.5%	2021
Kuwait	Middle East, North Africa, Afghanistan & Pakistan	High	N/A			
Laos	East Asia & Pacific	Lower middle	15.7%	35%	75.3%	2018
Lebanon	Middle East, North Africa, Afghanistan & Pakistan	Lower middle	5.9%	16%	50.7%	2022
Liberia	Sub-Saharan Africa	Low	N/A			
Libya	Middle East, North Africa, Afghanistan & Pakistan	Upper middle	N/A			
Saint Lucia	Latin America & Caribbean	Upper middle	N/A			
Liechtenstein	Europe & Central Asia	High	N/A			
Sri Lanka	South Asia	Lower middle	2.7%	11.5%	53.3%	2019
Lesotho	Sub-Saharan Africa	Lower middle	41.9%	56.8%	83.8%	2017
Lithuania	Europe & Central Asia	High	1.1%	1.2%	3.2%	2023
Luxembourg	Europe & Central Asia	High	0.1%	0.1%	0.2%	2023
Latvia	Europe & Central Asia	High	0.4%	0.7%	2.8%	2023
Macau	East Asia & Pacific	High	N/A			
Saint Martin	Latin America & Caribbean	High	N/A			
Morocco	Middle East, North Africa, Afghanistan & Pakistan	Lower middle	N/A			
Monaco	Europe & Central Asia	High	N/A			
Moldova	Europe & Central Asia	Upper middle	0.1%	0.8%	20.4%	2023
Madagascar	Sub-Saharan Africa	Low	69.2%	83.9%	96.6%	2021
Maldives	South Asia	Upper middle	0%	0%	11.2%	2019
Mexico	Latin America & Caribbean	Upper middle	2.3%	5.7%	27.4%	2022
Marshall Islands	East Asia & Pacific	Upper middle	2.1%	6.7%	36.5%	2019
North Macedonia	Europe & Central Asia	Upper middle	3.9%	7.4%	20.5%	2019
Mali	Sub-Saharan Africa	Low	36.1%	59.5%	88.6%	2021
Malta	Middle East, North Africa, Afghanistan & Pakistan	High	0.1%	0.2%	0.7%	2022
Myanmar	East Asia & Pacific	Lower middle	10.3%	29.1%	79.8%	2017
Montenegro	Europe & Central Asia	Upper middle	2.5%	4%	14.5%	2021
Mongolia	East Asia & Pacific	Upper middle	0.4%	2.3%	24.4%	2022
Northern Mariana Islands	East Asia & Pacific	High	N/A			
Mozambique	Sub-Saharan Africa	Low	81.4%	89.1%	96.3%	2022
Mauritania	Sub-Saharan Africa	Lower middle	10.2%	26%	71.2%	2019
Mauritius	Sub-Saharan Africa	Upper middle	0.5%	2.3%	19.1%	2017
Malawi	Sub-Saharan Africa	Low	75.4%	87.3%	97.1%	2019
Malaysia	East Asia & Pacific	Upper middle	0%	0.1%	2.9%	2021
Namibia	Sub-Saharan Africa	Lower middle	N/A			
New Caledonia	East Asia & Pacific	High	N/A			
Niger	Sub-Saharan Africa	Low	60.5%	79.7%	96.1%	2021
Nigeria	Sub-Saharan Africa	Lower middle	41.8%	64%	92.9%	2022
Nicaragua	Latin America & Caribbean	Lower middle	N/A			
Netherlands	Europe & Central Asia	High	0.1%	0.1%	0.3%	2021
Norway	Europe & Central Asia	High	0.2%	0.2%	0.4%	2023
Nepal	South Asia	Lower middle	2.4%	9.1%	52.6%	2022
Nauru	East Asia & Pacific	High	N/A			
New Zealand	East Asia & Pacific	High	N/A			
Oman	Middle East, North Africa, Afghanistan & Pakistan	High	N/A			
Pakistan	Middle East, North Africa, Afghanistan & Pakistan	Lower middle	16.5%	44.7%	88.4%	2018
Panama	Latin America & Caribbean	High	3.1%	6.8%	19.8%	2024
Peru	Latin America & Caribbean	Upper middle	5.1%	10.7%	36.2%	2024
Philippines	East Asia & Pacific	Lower middle	5.3%	16.9%	58.7%	2023
Palau	East Asia & Pacific	High	N/A			
Papua New Guinea	East Asia & Pacific	Lower middle	N/A			
Poland	Europe & Central Asia	High	0.2%	0.4%	1.1%	2023
Puerto Rico	Latin America & Caribbean	High	N/A			
North Korea	East Asia & Pacific	Low	N/A			
Portugal	Europe & Central Asia	High	0.4%	0.7%	2.2%	2023
Paraguay	Latin America & Caribbean	Upper middle	2.1%	4.5%	20.5%	2024
Palestine	Middle East, North Africa, Afghanistan & Pakistan	Lower middle	N/A			
French Polynesia	East Asia & Pacific	High	N/A			
Qatar	Middle East, North Africa, Afghanistan & Pakistan	High	0%	0%	0%	2017
Romania	Europe & Central Asia	High	0.7%	1.3%	5.1%	2023
Russia	Europe & Central Asia	High	0.1%	0.2%	0.9%	2023
Rwanda	Sub-Saharan Africa	Low	38.6%	62.2%	89.8%	2023
Saudi Arabia	Middle East, North Africa, Afghanistan & Pakistan	High	N/A			
Sudan	Sub-Saharan Africa	Low	N/A			
Senegal	Sub-Saharan Africa	Lower middle	17.9%	37.3%	78.6%	2021
Singapore	East Asia & Pacific	High	N/A			
Solomon Islands	East Asia & Pacific	Lower middle	N/A			
Sierra Leone	Sub-Saharan Africa	Low	41.5%	65%	91.5%	2018
El Salvador	Latin America & Caribbean	Upper middle	4.6%	8.6%	29.9%	2023
San Marino	Europe & Central Asia	High	N/A			
Serbia	Europe & Central Asia	Upper middle	2%	3.2%	10.3%	2022
South Sudan	Sub-Saharan Africa	Low	76.5%	88%	97.6%	2016
São Tomé and Príncipe	Sub-Saharan Africa	Lower middle	13%	30.5%	70%	2017
Suriname	Latin America & Caribbean	Upper middle	2.2%	4.6%	20.9%	2022
Slovakia	Europe & Central Asia	High	0.5%	0.8%	4.1%	2023
Slovenia	Europe & Central Asia	High	0%	0%	0.1%	2023
Sweden	Europe & Central Asia	High	0.8%	0.9%	1.5%	2023
Eswatini	Sub-Saharan Africa	Lower middle	N/A			
Sint Maarten	Latin America & Caribbean	High	N/A			
Seychelles	Sub-Saharan Africa	High	0.7%	1.4%	8.4%	2018
Syria	Middle East, North Africa, Afghanistan & Pakistan	Low	16.5%	39.3%	87.9%	2022
Turks and Caicos Islands	Latin America & Caribbean	High	N/A			
Chad	Sub-Saharan Africa	Low	39.5%	61.4%	89.5%	2022
Togo	Sub-Saharan Africa	Low	34.4%	55.3%	86.8%	2021
Thailand	East Asia & Pacific	Upper middle	0%	0.1%	9.9%	2023
Tajikistan	Europe & Central Asia	Lower middle	6.1%	16.9%	55.4%	2024
Turkmenistan	Europe & Central Asia	Upper middle	N/A			
Timor-Leste	East Asia & Pacific	Lower middle	N/A			
Tonga	East Asia & Pacific	Upper middle	0.4%	1.8%	26.7%	2021
Trinidad and Tobago	Latin America & Caribbean	High	N/A			
Tunisia	Middle East, North Africa, Afghanistan & Pakistan	Lower middle	0.7%	2.4%	20.7%	2021
Turkey	Europe & Central Asia	Upper middle	0.5%	1.2%	10.8%	2022
Tuvalu	East Asia & Pacific	Upper middle	N/A			
Taiwan	East Asia & Pacific	High	N/A			
Tanzania	Sub-Saharan Africa	Lower middle	51.3%	70%	91.5%	2018
Uganda	Sub-Saharan Africa	Low	59.8%	76.3%	93.6%	2019
Ukraine	Europe & Central Asia	Upper middle	0%	0.2%	11.3%	2020
Uruguay	Latin America & Caribbean	High	0.2%	0.5%	5.9%	2024
United States	North America	High	1.2%	1.5%	2%	2023
Uzbekistan	Europe & Central Asia	Lower middle	2.7%	5.1%	20.7%	2024
Saint Vincent and the Grenadines	Latin America & Caribbean	Upper middle	N/A			
Venezuela	Latin America & Caribbean		N/A			
British Virgin Islands	Latin America & Caribbean	High	N/A			
United States Virgin Islands	Latin America & Caribbean	High	N/A			
Vietnam	East Asia & Pacific	Lower middle	1.6%	4.2%	21.5%	2022
Vanuatu	East Asia & Pacific	Lower middle	19.5%	36.9%	81.3%	2019
Samoa	East Asia & Pacific	Upper middle	N/A			
Kosovo	Europe & Central Asia	Upper middle	10%	14.9%	38.2%	2022
Yemen	Middle East, North Africa, Afghanistan & Pakistan	Low	N/A			
South Africa	Sub-Saharan Africa	Upper middle	N/A			
Zambia	Sub-Saharan Africa	Lower middle	71.7%	81.4%	94%	2022
Zimbabwe	Sub-Saharan Africa	Lower middle	49.2%	64.6%	86.2%	2019
(United Nations) World			10.3%	18.9 %	46.3%	2024
Low & middle income economies (WB)			12.0%	22.1%	55.1%	2024
Low-income economies (WB)			56.3%	72.3%	92.2%	2023
Middle-income economies (WB)			N/A			
Lower middle income economies (WB)			12.0%	27.5%	74.7%	2024
Upper middle income economies (WB)			2.1%	4.9%	25.1%	2024
High-income economies (WB)			0.5%	0.7%	1.6%	2024

== Percentage of population living below national poverty line ==
The percentage of the population living below national poverty line (%) – poverty line deemed appropriate for a country by its authorities (however definitions of the poverty line vary considerably among nations). Sorting is alphabetical by country code, according to ISO 3166-1 alpha-3.

Country/Territory	Region	World Bank Income group (2024)	Poverty headcount ratio at national poverty lines	Year
Country/Territory	Region	World Bank Income group (2024)	% of population	Year
Aruba	Latin America & Caribbean	High income	N/A	
Afghanistan	South Asia	Low income	48%	2024
Angola	Sub-Saharan Africa	Lower middle income	32.3%	2018
Albania	Europe & Central Asia	Upper middle income	19.7%	2022
Andorra	Europe & Central Asia	High income	N/A	
United Arab Emirates	Middle East & North Africa	High income	N/A	
Argentina	Latin America & Caribbean	Upper middle income	31.7%	2025
Armenia	Europe & Central Asia	Upper middle income	24.8%	2022
American Samoa	East Asia & Pacific	High income	N/A	
Antigua and Barbuda	Latin America & Caribbean	High income	N/A	
Australia	East Asia & Pacific	High income	13.4%	2020
Austria	Europe & Central Asia	High income	14.8%	2021
Azerbaijan	Europe & Central Asia	Upper middle income	5.2%	2023
Burundi	Sub-Saharan Africa	Low income	53%	2010
Belgium	Europe & Central Asia	High income	12.3%	2022
Benin	Sub-Saharan Africa	Lower middle income	38.5%	2018
Burkina Faso	Sub-Saharan Africa	Low income	43.2%	2021
Bangladesh	South Asia	Lower middle income	19.2%	2025
Bulgaria	Europe & Central Asia	High income	20.6%	2022
Bahrain	Middle East & North Africa	High income	N/A	
Bahamas	Latin America & Caribbean	High income	9.3%	2004
Bosnia and Herzegovina	Europe & Central Asia	Upper middle income	17.5%	2021
Belarus	Europe & Central Asia	Upper middle income	3.9%	2022
Belize	Latin America & Caribbean	Upper middle income	41.3%	2009
Bermuda	North America	High income	N/A	
Bolivia	Latin America & Caribbean	Lower middle income	36.5%	2023
Brazil	Latin America & Caribbean	Upper middle income		
Barbados	Latin America & Caribbean	High income	N/A	
Brunei	East Asia & Pacific	High income	N/A	
Bhutan	South Asia	Lower middle income	12.4%	2022
Botswana	Sub-Saharan Africa	Upper middle income	16.3%	2016
Central African Republic	Sub-Saharan Africa	Low income	68.8%	2021
Canada	North America	High income	3.2%	2022
Switzerland	Europe & Central Asia	High income	8.4%	2024
Chile	Latin America & Caribbean	High income	6.2%	2022
China	East Asia & Pacific	Upper middle income	0.0%	2020
Ivory Coast	Sub-Saharan Africa	Lower middle income	37.5%	2021
Cameroon	Sub-Saharan Africa	Lower middle income	22%	2024
Democratic Republic of the Congo	Sub-Saharan Africa	Low income	63.9%	2012
Republic of the Congo	Sub-Saharan Africa	Lower middle income	40.9%	2011
Colombia	Latin America & Caribbean	Upper middle income	31.8%	2024
Comoros	Sub-Saharan Africa	Lower middle income	60%	2002
Cape Verde	Sub-Saharan Africa	Lower middle income	15%	2010
Costa Rica	Latin America & Caribbean	Upper middle income	20.3%	2024
Cuba	Latin America & Caribbean	Upper middle income	N/A	
Curaçao	Latin America & Caribbean	High income	N/A	
Cayman Islands	Latin America & Caribbean	High income	1.9%	2009
Cyprus	Europe & Central Asia	High income	13.9%	2021
Czech Republic	Europe & Central Asia	High income	9.5%	2023
Germany	Europe & Central Asia	High income	14.8%	2021
Djibouti	Sub-Saharan Africa	Lower middle income	21.1%	2017
Dominica	Latin America & Caribbean	Upper middle income	29%	2009
Denmark	Europe & Central Asia	High income	4%	2021
Dominican Republic	Latin America & Caribbean	Upper middle income	23.9%	2021
Algeria	Middle East & North Africa	Upper middle income	1.5%	2011
Ecuador	Latin America & Caribbean	Upper middle income	25.2%	2022
Egypt	Middle East & North Africa	Lower middle income	29.7%	2019
Eritrea	Sub-Saharan Africa	Low income	50%	2004
Spain	Europe & Central Asia	High income	20.2%	2022
Estonia	Europe & Central Asia	High income	22.5%	2022
Ethiopia	Sub-Saharan Africa	NA	20%	2019
Finland	Europe & Central Asia	High income	12.2%	2022
Fiji	East Asia & Pacific	Upper middle income	24.1%	2019
France	Europe & Central Asia	High income	15.6%	2021
Faroe Islands	Europe & Central Asia	High income	10.1%	2018
Federated States of Micronesia	East Asia & Pacific	Lower middle income	26.7%	2000
Gabon	Sub-Saharan Africa	Upper middle income	33.4%	2017
United Kingdom	Europe & Central Asia	High income	21%	2023
Georgia	Europe & Central Asia	Upper middle income	13.1%	2023
Ghana	Sub-Saharan Africa	Lower middle income	N/A	
Gibraltar	Europe & Central Asia	High income	N/A	
Guinea	Sub-Saharan Africa	Lower middle income	43.7%	2018
Gambia	Sub-Saharan Africa	Low income	53.4%	2020
Guinea-Bissau	Sub-Saharan Africa	Low income	50.5%	2021
Equatorial Guinea	Sub-Saharan Africa	Upper middle income	N/A	
Greece	Europe & Central Asia	High income	18.8%	2021
Grenada	Latin America & Caribbean	Upper middle income	25.0%	2018
Greenland	Europe & Central Asia	High income	16.2%	2015
Guatemala	Latin America & Caribbean	Upper middle income	56%	2023
Guam	East Asia & Pacific	High income	N/A	
Guyana	Latin America & Caribbean	High income	35%	2006
Hong Kong	East Asia & Pacific	High income	19.9%	2016
Honduras	Latin America & Caribbean	Lower middle income	64.1%	2023
Croatia	Europe & Central Asia	High income	18.0%	2021
Haiti	Latin America & Caribbean	Lower middle income	58.5%	2012
Hungary	Europe & Central Asia	High income	12.1%	2021
Indonesia	East Asia & Pacific	Upper middle income	9.4%	2023
Isle of Man	Europe & Central Asia	High income	N/A	
India	South Asia	Lower middle income	23.9%	2022
Ireland	Europe & Central Asia	High income	14.0%	2021
Iran	Middle East & North Africa	Upper middle income	N/A	
Iraq	Middle East & North Africa	Upper middle income	1.82%	2024
Iceland	Europe & Central Asia	High income	8.8%	2017
Israel	Middle East & North Africa	High income	20.9%	2023
Italy	Europe & Central Asia	High income	9.4%	2021
Jamaica	Latin America & Caribbean	Upper middle income	16.7%	2021
Jordan	Middle East & North Africa	Lower middle income	15.7%	2018
Japan	East Asia & Pacific	High income	N/A	
Kazakhstan	Europe & Central Asia	Upper middle income	5.2%	2022
Kenya	Sub-Saharan Africa	Lower middle income	14%	2022
Kyrgyzstan	Europe & Central Asia	Lower middle income	29.8%	2023
Cambodia	East Asia & Pacific	Lower middle income	14.2%	2022
Kiribati	East Asia & Pacific	Lower middle income	21.9%	2019
Saint Kitts and Nevis	Latin America & Caribbean	High income	N/A	
South Korea	East Asia & Pacific	High income	14.4%	2016
Kuwait	Middle East & North Africa	High income	N/A	
Laos	East Asia & Pacific	Lower middle income	18.3%	2018
Lebanon	Middle East & North Africa	Lower middle income	27.4%	2012
Liberia	Sub-Saharan Africa	Low income	N/A	
Libya	Middle East & North Africa	Upper middle income	N/A	
Saint Lucia	Latin America & Caribbean	Upper middle income	N/A	
Liechtenstein	Europe & Central Asia	High income	N/A	
Sri Lanka	South Asia	Lower middle income	14.3%	2019
Lesotho	Sub-Saharan Africa	Lower middle income	49.7%	2017
Lithuania	Europe & Central Asia	High income	20.9%	2021
Luxembourg	Europe & Central Asia	High income	17.3%	2021
Latvia	Europe & Central Asia	High income	22.5%	2022
Macau	East Asia & Pacific	High income	N/A	
Saint Martin	Latin America & Caribbean	High income	N/A	
Morocco	Middle East & North Africa	Lower middle income	3%	2022
Monaco	Europe & Central Asia	High income	N/A	
Moldova	Europe & Central Asia	Upper middle income	31.1%	2022
Madagascar	Sub-Saharan Africa	Low income	N/A	
Maldives	South Asia	Upper middle income	5.4%	2019
Mexico	North America	Upper middle income	29.6%	2024
Marshall Islands	East Asia & Pacific	Upper middle income	7.2%	2019
North Macedonia	Europe & Central Asia	Upper middle income	21.8%	2020
Mali	Sub-Saharan Africa	Low income	44.6%	2021
Malta	Europe & Central Asia	High income	16.7%	2021
Myanmar	East Asia & Pacific	Lower middle income	24.8%	2017
Montenegro	Europe & Central Asia	Upper middle income	20.3%	2021
Mongolia	East Asia & Pacific	Upper middle income	27.1%	2022
Northern Mariana Islands	East Asia & Pacific	High income	N/A	
Mozambique	Sub-Saharan Africa	Low income	52%	2009
Mauritania	Sub-Saharan Africa	Lower middle income	31.8%	2019
Mauritius	Sub-Saharan Africa	Upper middle income	10.3%	2017
Malawi	Sub-Saharan Africa	Low income	50.7%	2019
Malaysia	East Asia & Pacific	Upper middle income	5.1%	2024
Namibia	Sub-Saharan Africa	Upper middle income	N/A	
New Caledonia	East Asia & Pacific	High income	N/A	
Niger	Sub-Saharan Africa	Low income	45.5%	2021
Nigeria	Sub-Saharan Africa	Lower middle income	40.1%	2018
Nicaragua	Latin America & Caribbean	Lower middle income	24.9%	2016
Netherlands	Europe & Central Asia	High income	14.5%	2021
Norway	Europe & Central Asia	High income	12.2%	2021
Nepal	South Asia	Lower middle income	20.3%	2022
Nauru	East Asia & Pacific	High income	N/A	
New Zealand	East Asia & Pacific	High income	N/A	
Oman	Middle East & North Africa	High income	N/A	
Pakistan	South Asia	Lower middle income	44.7%	2026
Panama	Latin America & Caribbean	High income	13.4%	2023
Peru	Latin America & Caribbean	Upper middle income	27.5%	2022
Philippines	East Asia & Pacific	Lower middle income	9.7%	2025
Palau	East Asia & Pacific	High income	N/A	
Papua New Guinea	East Asia & Pacific	Lower middle income	39.9%	2009
Poland	Europe & Central Asia	High income	11.8%	2022
Puerto Rico	Latin America & Caribbean	High income	N/A	
North Korea	East Asia & Pacific	Low income	N/A	
Portugal	Europe & Central Asia	High income	15.4%	2024
Paraguay	Latin America & Caribbean	Upper middle income	16%	2025
Palestine	Middle East & North Africa	Lower middle income	N/A	
French Polynesia	East Asia & Pacific	High income	19.7%	2009
Qatar	Middle East & North Africa	High income	N/A	
Romania	Europe & Central Asia	High income	21.2%	2022
Russia	Europe & Central Asia	High income	11.0%	2021
Rwanda	Sub-Saharan Africa	Low income	38.2%	2016
Saudi Arabia	Middle East & North Africa	High income	N/A	
Sudan	Sub-Saharan Africa	Low income	46.5%	2009
Senegal	Sub-Saharan Africa	Lower middle income	46.7%	2011
Singapore	East Asia & Pacific	High income	N/A	
Solomon Islands	East Asia & Pacific	Lower middle income	N/A	
Sierra Leone	Sub-Saharan Africa	Low income	56.8%	2018
El Salvador	Latin America & Caribbean	Upper middle income	26.6%	2022
San Marino	Europe & Central Asia	High income	N/A	
Somalia	Sub-Saharan Africa	Low income	54.4%	2022
Serbia	Europe & Central Asia	Upper middle income	19.6%	2025
South Sudan	Sub-Saharan Africa	Low income	N/A	
São Tomé and Príncipe	Sub-Saharan Africa	Lower middle income	55.5%	2017
Suriname	Latin America & Caribbean	Upper middle income	70%	2002
Slovakia	Europe & Central Asia	High income	13.7%	2021
Slovenia	Europe & Central Asia	High income	12.7%	2025
Sweden	Europe & Central Asia	High income	16.1%	2022
Eswatini	Sub-Saharan Africa	Lower middle income	N/A	
Sint Maarten	Latin America & Caribbean	High income	N/A	
Seychelles	Sub-Saharan Africa	High income	25.3%	2018
Syria	Middle East & North Africa	Low income	90.5%	2026
Turks and Caicos Islands	Latin America & Caribbean	High income	N/A	
Chad	Sub-Saharan Africa	Low income	66.2%	2019
Togo	Sub-Saharan Africa	Low income	45.5%	2018
Thailand	East Asia & Pacific	Upper middle income	6.3%	2021
Tajikistan	Europe & Central Asia	Lower middle income	22.5%	2022
Turkmenistan	Europe & Central Asia	Upper middle income	N/A	
Timor-Leste	East Asia & Pacific	Lower middle income	N/A	
Tonga	East Asia & Pacific	Upper middle income	20.6%	2021
Trinidad and Tobago	Latin America & Caribbean	High income	N/A	
Tunisia	Middle East & North Africa	Lower middle income	16.6%	2021
Turkey	Europe & Central Asia	Upper middle income	14.4%	2021
Tuvalu	East Asia & Pacific	Upper middle income	N/A	
Tanzania	Sub-Saharan Africa	Lower middle income	26.4%	2018
Uganda	Sub-Saharan Africa	Low income	20.3%	2019
Ukraine	Europe & Central Asia	Upper middle income	1.6%	2020
Uruguay	Latin America & Caribbean	High income	9.9%	2022
United States	North America	High income	N/A	
Uzbekistan	Europe & Central Asia	Lower middle income	11.0%	2023
Saint Vincent and the Grenadines	Latin America & Caribbean	Upper middle income	N/A	
Venezuela	Latin America & Caribbean	NA	N/A	
British Virgin Islands	Latin America & Caribbean	High income	N/A	
United States Virgin Islands	Latin America & Caribbean	High income	N/A	
Vietnam	East Asia & Pacific	Lower middle income	4.3%	2022
Vanuatu	East Asia & Pacific	Lower middle income	15.9%	2019
Samoa	East Asia & Pacific	Upper middle income	21.9%	2018
Kosovo	Europe & Central Asia	Upper middle income	N/A	
Yemen	Middle East & North Africa	Low income	N/A	
South Africa	Sub-Saharan Africa	Upper middle income	N/A	
Zambia	Sub-Saharan Africa	Lower middle income	60.0%	2022
Zimbabwe	Sub-Saharan Africa	Lower middle income	38.3%	2019

== Percentage of working population living below global poverty lines ==
Percentage of working population who live in households that fall below the World Bank's international poverty lines of $2.15 and $3.65 a day, as per the International Labour Organization. Sorting is alphabetical by country code, according to ISO 3166-1 alpha-3.

Share of employment by economic class in 2023, with lowest economic class based on the World Bank's international poverty lines of $2.15 and $3.65 a day
Country	Region	World Bank Income group (2024)	Extremely poor: Less than $2.15 a day	Moderately poor: $2.15 to less than $3.65 a day	Not extremely or moderately poor: $3.65 or above a day
Afghanistan	South Asia	Low income	35%	56%	9%
Albania	Europe & Central Asia	Upper middle income	0%	0%	100%
Algeria	Middle East & North Africa	Upper middle income	0%	1%	99%
Angola	Sub-Saharan Africa	Lower middle income	31%	22%	47%
Argentina	Latin America & Caribbean	Upper middle income	9%	20%	71%
Armenia	Europe & Central Asia	Upper middle income	0%	2%	98%
Azerbaijan	Europe & Central Asia	Upper middle income	0%	0%	100%
Bahamas	Latin America & Caribbean	High income	0%	0%	100%
Bahrain	Middle East & North Africa	High income	0%	0%	100%
Bangladesh	South Asia	Lower middle income	6%	27%	67%
Barbados	Latin America & Caribbean	High income	2%	5%	93%
Belarus	Europe & Central Asia	Upper middle income	0%	0%	100%
Belize	Latin America & Caribbean	Upper middle income	12%	15%	73%
Benin	Sub-Saharan Africa	Lower middle income	14%	28%	58%
Bhutan	South Asia	Lower middle income	1%	3%	97%
Bolivia	Latin America & Caribbean	Lower middle income	2%	3%	95%
Bosnia and Herzegovina	Europe & Central Asia	Upper middle income	0%	0%	100%
Botswana	Sub-Saharan Africa	Upper middle income	8%	19%	73%
Brazil	Latin America & Caribbean	Upper middle income	3%	3%	95%
Burkina Faso	Sub-Saharan Africa	Low income	27%	30%	43%
Burundi	Sub-Saharan Africa	Low income	70%	19%	11%
Cape Verde	Sub-Saharan Africa	Lower middle income	0%	7%	93%
Cambodia	East Asia & Pacific	Lower middle income	20%	34%	46%
Cameroon	Sub-Saharan Africa	Lower middle income	20%	20%	60%
Central African Republic	Sub-Saharan Africa	Low income	66%	21%	13%
Chad	Sub-Saharan Africa	Low income	34%	33%	33%
Chile	Latin America & Caribbean	High income	0%	0%	99%
China	East Asia & Pacific	Upper middle income	0%	2%	98%
Colombia	Latin America & Caribbean	Upper middle income	3%	6%	91%
Comoros	Sub-Saharan Africa	Lower middle income	14%	18%	68%
Republic of the Congo	Sub-Saharan Africa	Lower middle income	50%	23%	27%
Democratic Republic of the Congo	Sub-Saharan Africa	Low income	57%	24%	19%
Costa Rica	Latin America & Caribbean	Upper middle income	0%	1%	99%
Ivory Coast	Sub-Saharan Africa	Lower middle income	10%	23%	67%
Dominican Republic	Latin America & Caribbean	Upper middle income	1%	2%	97%
Ecuador	Latin America & Caribbean	Upper middle income	3%	6%	91%
Egypt	Middle East & North Africa	Lower middle income	0%	12%	87%
El Salvador	Latin America & Caribbean	Upper middle income	2%	4%	94%
Equatorial Guinea	Sub-Saharan Africa	Upper middle income	33%	27%	40%
Eritrea	Sub-Saharan Africa	Low income	32%	28%	40%
Eswatini	Sub-Saharan Africa	Lower middle income	23%	22%	55%
Ethiopia	Sub-Saharan Africa	NA	18%	29%	53%
Fiji	East Asia & Pacific	Upper middle income	0%	10%	89%
Gabon	Sub-Saharan Africa	Upper middle income	1%	3%	96%
Gambia	Sub-Saharan Africa	Low income	14%	26%	60%
Georgia	Europe & Central Asia	Upper middle income	2%	8%	90%
Ghana	Sub-Saharan Africa	Lower middle income	18%	19%	63%
Guatemala	Latin America & Caribbean	Upper middle income	2%	7%	91%
Guinea	Sub-Saharan Africa	Lower middle income	15%	26%	59%
Guinea-Bissau	Sub-Saharan Africa	Low income	18%	33%	50%
Guyana	Latin America & Caribbean	High income	0%	1%	99%
Haiti	Latin America & Caribbean	Lower middle income	26%	27%	48%
Honduras	Latin America & Caribbean	Lower middle income	8%	12%	81%
Hong Kong	East Asia & Pacific	High income	0%	0%	100%
India	South Asia	Lower middle income	9%	30%	61%
Indonesia	East Asia & Pacific	Upper middle income	3%	16%	81%
Iran	Middle East & North Africa	Upper middle income	0%	0%	99%
Iraq	Middle East & North Africa	Upper middle income	0%	1%	99%
Jamaica	Latin America & Caribbean	Upper middle income	0%	5%	95%
Jordan	Middle East & North Africa	Lower middle income	0%	1%	98%
Kazakhstan	Europe & Central Asia	Upper middle income	0%	0%	100%
Kenya	Sub-Saharan Africa	Lower middle income	26%	34%	40%
South Korea	East Asia & Pacific	High income	0%	0%	100%
Kuwait	Middle East & North Africa	High income	0%	0%	100%
Kyrgyzstan	Europe & Central Asia	Lower middle income	1%	13%	86%
Laos	East Asia & Pacific	Lower middle income	7%	21%	72%
Lebanon	Middle East & North Africa	Lower middle income	0%	0%	100%
Lesotho	Sub-Saharan Africa	Lower middle income	26%	23%	51%
Liberia	Sub-Saharan Africa	Low income	31%	30%	40%
Libya	Middle East & North Africa	Upper middle income	5%	6%	89%
Madagascar	Sub-Saharan Africa	Low income	78%	15%	7%
Malawi	Sub-Saharan Africa	Low income	66%	21%	13%
Malaysia	East Asia & Pacific	Upper middle income	0%	0%	100%
Maldives	South Asia	Upper middle income	0%	0%	100%
Mali	Sub-Saharan Africa	Low income	16%	32%	52%
Mauritania	Sub-Saharan Africa	Lower middle income	4%	13%	83%
Mauritius	Sub-Saharan Africa	Upper middle income	0%	0%	100%
Mexico	North America	Upper middle income	1%	5%	94%
Moldova	Europe & Central Asia	Upper middle income	0%	1%	99%
Mongolia	East Asia & Pacific	Upper middle income	0%	2%	97%
Montenegro	Europe & Central Asia	Upper middle income	1%	2%	98%
Morocco	Middle East & North Africa	Lower middle income	0%	8%	92%
Mozambique	Sub-Saharan Africa	Low income	69%	17%	15%
Myanmar	East Asia & Pacific	Lower middle income	2%	15%	83%
Namibia	Sub-Saharan Africa	Upper middle income	11%	11%	78%
Nepal	South Asia	Lower middle income	2%	13%	85%
Nicaragua	Latin America & Caribbean	Lower middle income	2%	7%	91%
Niger	Sub-Saharan Africa	Low income	46%	32%	22%
Nigeria	Sub-Saharan Africa	Lower middle income	27%	31%	42%
North Macedonia	Europe & Central Asia	Upper middle income	1%	3%	96%
Palestine	Middle East & North Africa	Lower middle income	0%	1%	98%
Oman	Middle East & North Africa	High income	6%	7%	87%
Pakistan	South Asia	Lower middle income	4%	30%	66%
Panama	Latin America & Caribbean	High income	0%	1%	98%
Papua New Guinea	East Asia & Pacific	Lower middle income	29%	26%	45%
Paraguay	Latin America & Caribbean	Upper middle income	0%	2%	98%
Peru	Latin America & Caribbean	Upper middle income	5%	9%	87%
Philippines	East Asia & Pacific	Lower middle income	0%	9%	91%
Puerto Rico	Latin America & Caribbean	High income	0%	0%	100%
Qatar	Middle East & North Africa	High income	0%	0%	100%
Russia	Europe & Central Asia	High income	0%	0%	100%
Rwanda	Sub-Saharan Africa	Low income	33%	31%	36%
Saudi Arabia	Middle East & North Africa	High income	0%	0%	100%
Senegal	Sub-Saharan Africa	Lower middle income	9%	24%	67%
Serbia	Europe & Central Asia	Upper middle income	0%	0%	100%
Sierra Leone	Sub-Saharan Africa	Low income	27%	35%	38%
Solomon Islands	East Asia & Pacific	Lower middle income	35%	34%	31%
Somalia	Sub-Saharan Africa	Low income	59%	23%	18%
South Africa	Sub-Saharan Africa	Upper middle income	9%	12%	79%
Sri Lanka	South Asia	Lower middle income	2%	14%	84%
Sudan	Sub-Saharan Africa	Low income	31%	35%	35%
Suriname	Latin America & Caribbean	Upper middle income	18%	16%	65%
Syria	Middle East & North Africa	Low income	68%	18%	14%
Taiwan	East Asia & Pacific	High income	0%	0%	100%
Tajikistan	Europe & Central Asia	Lower middle income	3%	9%	88%
Tanzania	Sub-Saharan Africa	Lower middle income	42%	30%	28%
Thailand	East Asia & Pacific	Upper middle income	0%	0%	100%
Timor-Leste	East Asia & Pacific	Lower middle income	30%	42%	29%
Togo	Sub-Saharan Africa	Low income	16%	28%	55%
Trinidad and Tobago	Latin America & Caribbean	High income	0%	0%	100%
Tunisia	Middle East & North Africa	Lower middle income	0%	1%	99%
Turkey	Europe & Central Asia	Upper middle income	0%	0%	100%
Turkmenistan	Europe & Central Asia	Upper middle income	1%	3%	96%
Uganda	Sub-Saharan Africa	Low income	37%	31%	32%
Ukraine	Europe & Central Asia	Upper middle income	0%	0%	100%
United Arab Emirates	Middle East & North Africa	High income	0%	0%	100%
Uruguay	Latin America & Caribbean	High income	0%	0%	100%
Uzbekistan	Europe & Central Asia	Lower middle income	19%	37%	44%
Venezuela	Latin America & Caribbean	NA	25%	24%	51%
Vietnam	East Asia & Pacific	Lower middle income	1%	3%	96%
Yemen	Middle East & North Africa	Low income	57%	24%	20%
Zambia	Sub-Saharan Africa	Lower middle income	56%	19%	25%
Zimbabwe	Sub-Saharan Africa	Lower middle income	35%	25%	40%
Note: Data refers to 2021 for Ukraine and 2022 for the Occupied Palestinian Territory

== See also ==
- List of countries by Human Development Index
- List of countries by share of income of the richest one percent
- List of sovereign states by Official Development Assistance received
- List of countries by minimum wage
- List of countries by income inequality
- Economic inequality
- Income distribution
- International inequality
