= Lumby (surname) =

Lumby is a surname. Notable people with the surname include:

- Catharine Lumby, Australian academic, author and journalist
- Gary Lumby, British banker
- Jeff Lumby, Canadian actor
- Jim Lumby, soccer player
- Joseph Rawson Lumby (1831–95), English cleric, academic, author and divine
- Thomas and Henry Lumby, 18th-century English architects
- Walter Lumby, English footballer
- Wendy Lumby (born 1966), British alpine skier

== See also ==
- Lumbye
