= Lumbye =

Lumbye is the surname of several different people:

- Hans Christian Lumbye, Danish composer
- Carl Lumbye, Danish composer and conductor, son of Hans Christian Lumbye
- Georg Lumbye, Danish composer and conductor, son of Hans Christian Lumbye
- Theodor "Tippe" Lumbye, Danish composer and conductor, son of Georg Lumbye
- Knud Lumbye, Danish actor

== See also ==
- Lumby (surname)
