= Geared for Giving =

Geared for Giving was a British payroll giving campaign to encourage people to use the payroll giving facility to donate to charities. The campaign was first launched at the House of Commons of the United Kingdom on 19 May 2008 by Anne Snelgrove, MP for South Swindon and Duncan Bannatyne OBE.

== History ==
The Geared for Giving Campaign was originally established in 2008 to raise awareness of Payroll Giving with UK business leaders. Payroll Giving (also known Give As You Earn) is a scheme of making charitable tax-efficient donations by giving directly from payroll to any charity.

In 2016 the campaign was relaunched. Geared for Giving continues as a fundraising campaign, this time with a new mission to double the amount raised by Payroll Giving for charities to £260m annually, by increasing the number of employees giving through pay from 1 million to 2 million.
