= World Giving Index =

Annual ranking of charitable giving by country

The World Giving Index (WGI) was an annual report published by the Charities Aid Foundation, using data gathered by Gallup, which ranked over 140 countries in the world according to how charitable they are. The aim of the World Giving Index was to provide insight into the scope and nature of giving around the world. The first edition was released in September 2010. The final edition was published in 2024. The report has now been superseded by the World Giving Report which offers a fuller picture of global generosity.

== Methodology ==
This report is primarily based upon data from the Gallup World Poll, which is an ongoing research project carried out in more than 140 countries that together represent around 95% of the world's adult population (around 5 billion people). In most countries surveyed, 1,000 questionnaires are completed by a representative sample of individuals living across the country. The coverage area is the entire country, including rural areas. The sampling frame represents the entire civilian, non-institutionalized, aged 15 and older population of the entire country. In some large countries such as China and Russia, samples of at least 2,000 are collected, while in a small number of countries, the poll covers 500 to 1,000 people but still features a representative sample. The survey is not conducted in a limited number of instances, including where the safety of interviewing staff is threatened, scarcely populated islands in some countries, and areas that interviewers can reach only by foot, animal, or small boat.

In all, over 150,000 people were interviewed by Gallup in 2014, and samples are probability-based. Surveys are carried out by telephone or face-to-face depending on the country's telephone coverage. There is of course a margin of error (the amount of random sampling error) in the results for each country, which is calculated by Gallup around a proportion at the 95% confidence level (the level of confidence that the results are a true reflection of the whole population). The maximum margin of error is calculated assuming a reported percentage of 50% and takes into account the design effect.

Gallup asked people which of the following three charitable acts they had undertaken in the past month:

- helped a stranger, or someone they did not know who needed help
- donated money to a charity
- volunteered their time to an organization

== World Giving Index rankings ==
Country	2022 rank	2021 rank	2019 rank	2018 rank	2017 rank	2016 rank	2015 rank	2014 rank	2013 rank
Indonesia	1	1	10	1	2	7	22	13	17
Kenya	2	2	11	8	3	12	11	15	33
United States	3	19	1	4	5	2	1	1	1
Australia	4	5	4	2	6	3	5	6	7
New Zealand	5	7	3	3	4	4	3	5	2
Myanmar	6	4	2	9	1	1	1	1	2
Sierra Leone	7	n/a	20	20	12	46	54	55	n/a
Canada	8	35	6	14	7	6	4	3	2
Zambia	9	17	32	21	18	63	51	47	45
Ukraine	10	20	101	81	90	106	89	103	102
Ireland	11	26	5	6	8	9	9	4	5
Thailand	12	10	21	61	16	37	19	21	38
Czech Republic	13	88	111	125	128	121	130	112	103
Nigeria	14	3	22	16	28	56	43	21	20
United Arab Emirates	15	13	14	12	9	10	14	n/a	n/a
Poland	16	37	86	112	105	109	78	115	84
United Kingdom	17	22	7	5	11	8	6	7	6
Brazil	18	54	74	73	n/a	n/a	61	n/a	n/a
Guinea	19	n/a	51	70	98	69	80	40	74
Philippines	20	65	33	89	54	47	46	30	16
Argentina	21	74	75	94	83	83	108	77	78
Uganda	22	8	35	50	22	26	57	34	48
Iceland	23	46	n/a	17	15	17	n/a	14	17
Denmark	24	40	16	24	21	20	39	18	25
Mongolia	25	16	37	45	29	27	52	32	41
Honduras	26	n/a	43	46	40	74	60	58	55
Serbia	27	48	123	129	132	135	118	124	123
Jamaica	28	57	n/a	56	n/a	n/a	21	20	n/a
Netherlands	29	39	8	11	10	13	7	12	8
Russia	30	67	117	110	124	126	129	126	123
Singapore	31	n/a	46	7	30	28	34	n/a	64
Norway	32	47	n/a	13	20	14	15	n/a	11
Austria	33	62	15	32	26	30	23	17	15
Macedonia	34	38	96	130	64	119	86	72	118
Malta	35	77	12	18	13	16	12	16	12
Venezuela	36	53	108	107	115	117	128	134	91
Mexico	37	73	73	114	106	107	90	85	76
Dominican Republic	38	33	31	49	32	36	41	27	39
Paraguay	39	23	60	59	120	101	125	68	45
Sri Lanka	40	63	9	27	n/a	5	8	9	10
Kyrgyzstan	41	36	55	55	85	34	18	83	73
Bosnia and Herzegovina	42	60	91	90	59	128	88	103	109
Costa Rica	43	83	39	62	43	62	36	34	23
Kosovo	44	9	62	66	65	60	116	50	78
Bolivia	45	55	61	86	70	70	65	57	54
Ghana	46	6	38	37	23	77	63	54	61
Vietnam	47	25	84	n/a	116	64	79	79	116
Iran	48	32	23	29	17	45	32	19	n/a
China	49	95	126	142	138	140	144	128	133
Sweden	50	64	29	42	34	25	28	40	39
Colombia	51	51	49	80	61	73	66	53	31
Ecuador	52	90	98	119	53	97	131	132	84
Slovakia	53	72	94	88	102	124	123	94	101
Bulgaria	54	45	120	126	127	129	115	126	118
Germany	55	85	18	22	19	21	20	28	22
Nepal	56	27	53	52	51	39	76	44	55
India	57	14	82	124	81	91	106	69	93
Nicaragua	58	41	68	67	87	76	69	67	82
Uruguay	59	71	65	77	60	58	77	62	47
Cyprus	60	70	24	35	45	35	42	23	24
Senegal	61	50	71	87	79	95	85	79	57
Hungary	62	82	109	120	119	134	124	72	78
Turkey	63	78	n/a	131	n/a	n/a	n/a	128	128
Estonia	64	84	95	109	100	118	99	103	93
Burkina Faso	65	n/a	87	82	86	72	104	90	109
Tajikistan	66	11	44	36	50	87	73	34	64
Malawi	67	n/a	36	57	36	38	44	56	43
Peru	68	57	72	100	88	65	114	72	84
Slovenia	69	94	40	47	58	40	37	34	44
Uzbekistan	70	29	25	53	38	11	27	28	50
Chile	71	31	41	61	49	55	49	50	35
Congo	72	56	76	115	77	136	91	99	93
Mali	73	80	99	93	112	99	121	118	123
Finland	74	81	25	44	37	24	31	25	33
Iraq	75	34	52	34	39	31	38	43	89
Switzerland	76	97	13	26	33	23	40	n/a	12
Cameroon	77	18	56	63	68	51	92	58	63
Israel	78	92	34	38	35	43	75	32	31
Mauritius	79	61	n/a	25	130	n/a	45	n/a	93
Ivory Coast	80	52	n/a	111	91	104	107	69	n/a
Hong Kong	81	104	n/a	30	25	n/a	26	n/a	17
Croatia	82	86	118	132	121	127	62	130	133
Lithuania	83	99	121	138	137	124	142	119	120
Panama	84	n/a	47	78	57	33	53	46	48
Saudi Arabia	85	49	50	51	48	41	47	47	57
El Salvador	86	79	93	127	94	85	117	96	107
South Africa	87	21	45	40	24	61	49	34	69
South Korea	88	110	57	60	62	75	64	60	n/a
Namibia	89	42	n/a	122	n/a	n/a	61	n/a	n/a
Moldova	90	43	80	99	n/a	110	120	96	88
Taiwan	91	87	48	64	52	50	35	47	52
Togo	92	n/a	n/a	117	109	103	133	n/a	n/a
Kazakhstan	93	98	78	96	87	96	56	101	66
Mozambique	94	n/a	n/a	79	n/a	n/a	n/a	n/a	n/a
Gabon	95	103	77	113	96	89	111	69	78
Albania	96	65	105	108	95	105	83	85	132
Tanzania	97	24	59	84	63	57	81	87	51
Benin	98	91	106	105	113	102	132	103	120
Spain	99	100	58	54	71	79	58	62	57
France	100	106	66	72	67	81	74	90	77
Jordan	101	102	90	75	74	71	118	99	120
Greece	102	101	125	143	114	137	140	120	135
Morocco	103	109	83	104	136	123	126	112	115
Georgia	104	28	112	118	135	120	112	123	116
Zimbabwe	105	44	70	76	72	108	87	94	82
Romania	106	96	97	102	80	93	93	108	105
Algeria	107	76	n/a	92	n/a	n/a	n/a	n/a	109
Pakistan	108	107	69	91	n/a	92	94	61	53
Italy	109	111	54	68	84	82	72	79	21
Armenia	110	n/a	114	123	122	130	138	124	113
Latvia	111	105	110	137	131	113	110	89	93
Tunisia	112	89	103	135	92	122	139	120	103
Laos	113	75	n/a	134	n/a	n/a	n/a	n/a	41
Portugal	114	113	88	83	104	90	82	78	71
Lebanon	115	108	67	85	76	80	96	65	68
Egypt	116	68	104	106	108	112	112	120	105
Afghanistan	117	n/a	63	136	89	78	84	79	35
Japan	118	114	107	128	111	114	102	90	n/a
Cambodia	119	93	102	140	134	98	100	108	93
Azerbaijan	n/a	n/a	99	139	126	131	122	87	69
Angola	n/a	n/a	n/a	n/a	n/a	n/a	134	96	n/a
Bahrain	n/a	12	n/a	10	n/a	n/a	13	n/a	n/a
Bangladesh	n/a	69	81	74	129	94	95	72	89
Belarus	n/a	n/a	92	121	117	100	103	83	93
Belgium	n/a	112	42	39	56	32	48	52	57
Belize	n/a	n/a	n/a	n/a	n/a	n/a	70	n/a	n/a
Bhutan	n/a	n/a	n/a	n/a	n/a	18	17	n/a	n/a
Botswana	n/a	n/a	64	97	93	54	55	62	84
Burundi	n/a	n/a	n/a	n/a	n/a	n/a	145	n/a	n/a
Central African Republic	n/a	n/a	n/a	69	n/a	n/a	n/a	n/a	n/a
Comoros	n/a	n/a	n/a	n/a	n/a	n/a	n/a	n/a	84
Chad	n/a	n/a	89	101	99	111	136	115	93
Democratic Republic of the Congo	n/a	n/a	113	58	125	136	127	112	131
Ethiopia	n/a	15	79	98	107	84	97	72	109
Gambia	n/a	n/a	n/a	31	n/a	n/a	n/a	n/a	n/a
Guatemala	n/a	n/a	26	65	41	29	16	25	30
Haiti	n/a	n/a	27	15	55	53	59	40	28
Kuwait	n/a	n/a	n/a	33	31	19	24	n/a	n/a
Lesotho	n/a	n/a	n/a	95	n/a	n/a	n/a	n/a	n/a
Liberia	n/a	n/a	17	19	14	52	25	45	n/a
Libya	n/a	n/a	n/a	28	42	44	n/a	n/a	14
Luxembourg	n/a	n/a	28	41	44	49	33	65	28
Madagascar	n/a	n/a	116	100	133	132	101	110	113
Malaysia	n/a	29	30	n/a	n/a	22	10	7	71
Mauritania	n/a	n/a	85	133	130	88	109	115	93
Montenegro	n/a	59	119	116	110	133	98	130	126
Niger	n/a	n/a	100	71	118	115	135	102	108
Northern Cyprus	n/a	n/a	n/a	n/a	46	42	30	39	n/a
Palestinian Territory	n/a	n/a	122	141	n/a	139	141	133	127
Puerto Rico	n/a	n/a	n/a	n/a	n/a	n/a	29	n/a	n/a
Qatar	n/a	n/a	n/a	n/a	n/a	n/a	n/a	n/a	9
Rwanda	n/a	n/a	115	103	101	116	137	110	128
South Sudan	n/a	n/a	n/a	48	73	48	68	n/a	n/a
Sudan	n/a	n/a	n/a	n/a	n/a	n/a	67	n/a	61
Suriname	n/a	n/a	n/a	n/a	n/a	n/a	n/a	n/a	66
Syria	n/a	n/a	n/a	n/a	n/a	66	n/a	30	35
Trinidad and Tobago	n/a	n/a	n/a	23	n/a	n/a	n/a	10	n/a
Turkmenistan	n/a	n/a	19	43	69	15	71	23	26
Yemen	n/a	n/a	124	144	139	138	143	134	130

"n/a" indicates a country was not surveyed for that year's World Giving Index report

== Response to the results (2010) ==
In 2010, the Sri Lankan President Mahinda Rajapaksa hailed the results of the Index where Sri Lanka came in 8th. President Rajapaksa said it captured "the reality of our caring and sharing society".

In 2010, the President of Taiwan, Ma Ying-jeou described the results as "unfair" and stated that Taiwan had transformed itself from an "importer of love to an exporter of love".

Australian Parliamentary Secretary for Social Inclusion and the Voluntary Sector and Senator for New South Wales, Ursula Stephens said, "I see each day the enormous efforts of our country's five million volunteers and witness the generosity of the millions of Australians whose donations make the work of our non-profit organizations possible. So, this result on the World Giving Index is confirmation of what we already know – we are a country of generous people who are quick to lend a helping hand in times of need."

The Community and Voluntary Sector Minister in New Zealand, Tariana Turia, said, "The report shows that New Zealanders are particularly generous when it comes to giving money and helping strangers, but also in terms of volunteering. As a nation we must celebrate our generosity and make sure that our decisions and our actions bolster it even further."
