= Bannatyne (company) =

UK-based health club chain

Bannatyne Fitness Limited
- Formerly: Bannatyne Health And Leisure Ltd. (1996–1999)
- Type: Private
- Industry: Health club; Spa; Hotel
- Founded: 1997; 29 years ago
- Founder: Duncan Bannatyne
- Headquarters: Darlington, County Durham
- Website: bannatyne.co.uk

Bannatyne Fitness Limited, trading as Bannatyne, is a United Kingdom-based chain of health clubs founded by Scottish businessman Duncan Bannatyne.

== History ==
The Bannatyne Health Clubs chain began in 1997 with the first club built in Ingleby Barwick, North Yorkshire.

In November 2015, former finance director Christopher Watson was jailed after pleading guilty to defrauding the Bannatyne Group of nearly £8 million.

It was reported in March 2016 that the company was planning a £300m float, listing on AIM. However, this proposed float was pulled in May 2016 due to unspecified "regulatory scrutiny" of the move.

== Personnel ==
In 2016, Justin Musgrove, formerly the Managing Director, took on the role of Chief Executive Officer, Ken Campling was appointed as Chief Financial Officer and Board Director and Anthony Elliott as Director of Operations.

== Portfolio ==
As of December 2023, Bannatyne has 69 health clubs, 45 spas and three hotels across the UK.

On 9 August 2006, Bannatyne Fitness Ltd acquired the LivingWell Premier Health club chain from the Hilton Hotel UK Group. The company also bought Clarice House and Xpect Leisure in 2015, growing its membership by 14% over the year to 186,456.
