= Kelowna Pacific Railway =

Overview
- Headquarters: Vernon, British Columbia, Canada
- Reporting mark: KPR
- Locale: British Columbia, Canada
- Dates of operation: 1999–2013
- Predecessor: Canadian National Railway

Technical
- Track gauge: 1,435 mm (4 ft 8 1/2 in) standard gauge
- Length: 174.4 km (108.4 mi)

Kelowna Pacific Railway (reporting mark KPR) was a short-line railroad, formerly a Canadian National Railway line, leased by Knighthawk Rail. The KPR's line ran from Kelowna to Kamloops through the Okanagan Valley. Operations started on January 30, 2000, and ended on July 5, 2013, when the company entered receivership.

The mainline track was 167.7 km (104.2 mi), with an additional 10.3 km (6.4 mi) of associated spurs and sidings. In addition 41.2 km (25.6 mi) of running rights of Canadian Pacific Railway were held by KPR. It also connected with CN's Kamloops Rail Yard. Between Vernon and Armstrong/Lumby, the Canadian Pacific Railway shared the line with the KPR, although no trains are currently run by CPR along that line.

The company entered receivership on July 5, 2013, with all operations suspended.

On September 26, 2013, CN announced that it had reached agreements with a major shipper and two locals of the Teamsters union that would allow CN to resume operations over most of the Kelowna Pacific. CN said it planned to abandon the line between Lumby Junction and Kelowna. In 2014 CN began removing the railroad tracks in Kelowna.

== Operations ==
KPR transported over 16,000 carloads per year. Most of the goods transported by the KPR are wood products; although grain, cement, scrap metal and industrial products could be seen. As of 2011, the KPR ran trains 5 days per week, with the schedule as follows:

- Kelowna: Monday and Wednesday (Trains staying overnight and return to Vernon on Tuesday and Thursday)
- Lumby: Tuesday and Friday
- Kamloops: As required

== Customers ==
- Tolko Industries, Kelowna Division (Kelowna - lumber)
- Sun-Rype (Kelowna - fruits and fruit products, beverages)
- OK Builders Supplies (Kelowna - building materials)
- Knox Mountain Metals (Kelowna - scrap metal)
- Action Metals (Kelowna - scrap metal)
- Superior Propane (Kelowna - propane)
- Okanagan Transload Terminal (Lake Country - various)
- Ashland Canada (Lake Country - industrial chemicals)
- Tolko Industries, Winfield Reload (Lake Country - lumber)
- Coldstream Lumber (Coldstream - lumber)
- Tolko Industries, Lavington Division (Lavington - lumber)
- Gorman Bros. (Lavington - Lumber)
- Tolko Industries, Whitevalley Division (Lumby - veneer)
- Rogers Flour (Armstrong - grain)
- Tolko Industries, Armstrong Division (Armstrong - lumber and plywood)
- Unifeed (Armstrong - feedgrains and seed)
- Armstrong Pellets Inc (Armstrong - Wood Pellets)
- Lehigh Cement (Kamloops - Cement)
- Moly Cop Canada (Kamloops - Steel Products)
- Okanagan Pellet Company

== See also ==
- Okanagan Valley Railway
