= List of development aid sovereign state donors =

International development aid is given by many non-private donors. The first table is based on official development assistance (ODA) figures published by the OECD for members of its Development Assistance Committee (DAC). Non-DAC members included in the OECD's publishing are listed separately.

Luxembourg made the largest contribution as a percentage of gross national income (GNI) at 1.05% and the United Nations’ ODA target of 0.7% of GNI was also exceeded by Norway (1.02%), Sweden (0.99%) and Denmark (0.71%). The European Union accumulated a higher portion of GDP as a form of foreign aid than any other economic union.

The United States is a small contributor relative to GNI (0.22% 2022) but is the largest single DAC donor of ODA in 2022 (US$55.3 billion), followed by Germany (0.8% GNI, US$35.0 billion), France (0.7%, US$19.5 billion) and Japan (0.3%, US$17.3 billion). Many providers beyond the DAC have long traditions of development cooperation. Amongst these, according to the preliminary figures for 2019 reported to the OECD, Turkey exceeded the 0.7% ODA/GNI target with 1.15%.

== Net official development assistance by donor ==
To qualify as official development assistance, a contribution must contain three elements:

1. Be undertaken by the official sector (that is, a government or government agency);
2. With promotion of economic development and welfare as the main objective;
3. At concessional financial terms (that is, with favorable loan terms.)

Thus, by definition, ODA does not include private donations, nor any development loans at market rates. The sum of contributions by EU member states, considered separately from EU institutions, was over $70 billion. The OECD's Development Assistance Committee members' total budget reached around 150 billion dollars and was contributed by the following donors in 2019:

Donor	Total development aid (millions $)	Development aid per capita ($)	% of GNI	DAC member	Ref.
Argentina	3,300	68.23	0.62	No	
Australia (Aid)	2,950	129.92	0.22	Yes	
Austria	1,210	137.59	0.27	Yes	
Belgium	2,180	167.20	0.42	Yes	
Brazil	10,800	54.77	0.56	No	
Bulgaria	130	20.00	0.20	No	
Canada (Aid)	6,400	170.25	0.27	Yes	
Chile Chile	1,700	76.23	0.58	No	
China (Aid)	8,360*	27.86	0.08	No	
Croatia	50	12.00	0.14	No	
Czech Republic	310	18.85	0.13	Yes	
Denmark	2,550	447.05	0.71	Yes	
Estonia	40	23.00	0.13	No	
European Union	14,827	27.03	–	Yes	(Note: Excluding EU members.)
Finland	1,130	234.13	0.42	Yes	
France	19,570	294.18	0.78	Yes	
Germany	35,020	417.36	0.83	Yes	
Greece	310	25.04	0.14	Yes	
Hungary	150	15.00	0.10	No	
Iceland	70	120.29	0.27	Yes	
India (Aid)	33,000	21.24	0.65	No	(Note: $2.4 billion grants + $30.59 billion LOC)
Ireland	940	151.20	0.31	Yes	
Israel (Aid)	1,120	96.00	0.07	No	
Italy	4,900	63.38	0.24	Yes	
Japan	17,470	137.58	0.39	Yes	
Latvia	30	10.00	0.10	No	
Lithuania	60	14.00	0.11	No	
Luxembourg	470	609.48	1.05	Yes	
Malta	40	22.00	0.30	No	
Mexico Mexico	5,500	38.77	0.46	No	
Netherlands	5,290	338.38	0.59	Yes	
New Zealand	560	90.75	0.28	Yes	
Norway	4,290	812.58	1.02	Yes	
Poland	680	11.45	0.12	Yes	
Portugal	370	30.07	0.16	Yes	
Qatar (Aid)	2,000	757.80	1.17	No	
Romania	411	22.00	0.14	No	
Russia	1,140	8.00	0.03	No	
Slovak Republic	130	16.56	0.12	Yes	
Slovenia	90	29.04	0.16	Yes	
South Korea	2,520	37.13	0.15	Yes	
Spain	2,900	44.52	0.21	Yes	
Sweden	5,400	701.10	0.99	Yes	
Switzerland	4,290	421.37	0.44	Yes	
Taiwan	502	21.30	0.07	No	
Turkey	8,652	47.00	1.15	No	
UAE United Arab Emirates (Aid)	12,240	467.00	0.55	No	
United Kingdom	5,750	87.12	0.18	Yes	
United States (Aid)	55,270	165.47	0.22	Yes	

== See also ==
- List of countries by Official Development Assistance received
