= Charities Aid Foundation =

International charitable organisation

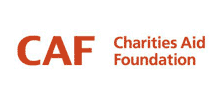
- Type: Registered charity
- Founded: UK, 1974
- Headquarters: Kent, UK
- Area served: Worldwide
- Revenue: 706,322,000 pound sterling (2020)
- Number of employees: 560 (2020)
- Website: CAFonline.org

The Charities Aid Foundation (CAF) is a registered charity that operates in the United Kingdom, the United States of America and Canada. It works with companies, private philanthropists, regular donors, fellow foundations, governments, charities and not-for-profit enterprises to enable them to give more.

In 2026, CAF was listed by the Charity Commission for England and Wales as the country's second largest charity by income. It acts as a regulatory expert to ensure funds reach charities and social enterprises as quickly and safely as possible via its charity validation which enables effective cross-border giving. CAF also wholly owns CAF Bank, a fully regulated bank that serves UK-based charities and social enterprises.

CAF Group consists of Charities Aid Foundation and its subsidiaries in the UK including CAF Bank; CAF America; the CAF American Donor Fund and CAF Canada. In addition to offices in the UK, America, and Canada, CAF leads a network of independent philanthropic organisations in several other countries.

As well as offering a range of services to charities, philanthropists and businesses, CAF researches charitable giving. CAF produces the World Giving Index as well as the UK Giving report – the largest multi-year study of giving behaviour in the UK.

== History ==
In 1924, the National Council of Social Service set up a Charities Department to encourage efficient giving to charity. This department was later renamed the Charities Aid Fund while the National Council of Social Service became the National Council for Voluntary Organisations (NCVO). The Charities Aid Foundation took its current name in 1974 when it became a fully independent organisation.

== Activities ==
CAF provides services to charities, businesses and individuals in the UK and abroad, including help with fundraising, consultancy, and loans and grants.

=== Services to charities ===
CAF offers banking services through CAF Bank, a wholly owned subsidiary that provides banking services to charities and social purpose organisations. The bank offers transactional current and deposit accounts via telephone and internet banking, and provides lending to customers. In 2021, CAF Bank won Charities' Bank of the Year at the Charity Times Awards.

In July 2026, CAF Bank temporarily suspended online banking to fix security vulnerabilities following reports of suspicious activity on some customer accounts.

CAF also owns and operates CAF Donate, an online donation processing platform giving charities the tools to fundraise through the web, mobile devices and Facebook, and process donations received by post and phone.

=== Services to businesses ===
CAF works with the majority of FTSE100 companies to enable their corporate giving. In the UK, CAF operates payroll giving ("give as you earn") schemes for employers.

CAF Company Accounts enable companies to give tax effectively and to donate safely to any charitable organisation around the world. CAF also advises on setting up corporate foundations.

=== Services to individual donors ===
CAF gives advice on philanthropy and partners with wealth advisers to meet the charitable needs of their clients.

CAF operates a Charity Account scheme, which acts like a current account for charitable giving. Account-holders to donate to charities through a personal account, by phone, post, or online. Donations are eligible for tax relief under the UK's Gift Aid rules.

Through the CAF Charitable Trust, CAF provides major donors with advice for their giving plans within the UK and internationally. CAF also offers donor-advised fund services and legacy services for gifts from wills.

Financial journalist Martin Lewis works with CAF to manage the £10 million he pledged to charity following the sale of MoneySavingExpert.com.

The CAF American Donor Fund (CADF) offers tax-effective philanthropy services for dual UK and US taxpayers.

== Initiatives ==
Working with pollster Gallup, CAF releases an annual global report on generosity, entitled the World Giving Index, that ranks most countries in the world against three measures: helping a stranger, donating money, and volunteering. CAF has been producing the World Giving Index since 2010.

CAF's research team has produced an annual report into giving behaviour in the UK – the largest study of its kind – since 2004. The UK Giving report is based on data sourced monthly through YouGov and highlights key trends that assist charities, policymakers, and wider society.

CAF introduced the Giving Tuesday initiative in the UK in 2013 and led the campaign until 2021.

== Awards and accreditation ==
CAF is a member of the Financial Services Compensation Scheme (FSCS), the UK's deposit guarantee scheme.

CAF Bank was a finalist in the Best Charity Banking Provider category at the Moneyfacts Group's Business Moneyfacts Awards 2022. CAF Bank was also named Charity Bank of the year at the 2021 Charity Times Awards, and the CAF Bank Customer Service Team were finalists in the Institute of Customer Service's UK Customer Satisfaction Awards.
