= Walter Lumby =

English footballer

Personal information
- Full name: Walter Charles William Lumby
- Date of birth: 16 January 1915
- Place of birth: Milton Regis, England
- Date of death: 2001 (aged 85–86)
- Height: 5 ft 8 in (1.73 m)
- Position: Wing half

Senior career*
| Years | Team | Apps | (Gls) |
| 1932–1933 | Lloyds Paper Mills | | |
| 1933–1934 | Murston Town | | |
| 1934 | Sittingbourne | | |
| 1934–1938 | Grimsby Town | 3 | (0) |
| 1938–1941 | Stockport County | 15 | (1) |
| 1941–1945 | Distillery | | |
| 1945–1946 | Park United | | |
| 1946–194? | Weelsby Social | | |
- * Club domestic league appearances and goals

Walter Charles William Lumby (16 January 1915 – 2001) was an English professional footballer who played as a wing half.
