= Duncan Bannatyne =

Scottish entrepreneur, philanthropist and author (born 1949)

Duncan Bannatyne OBE
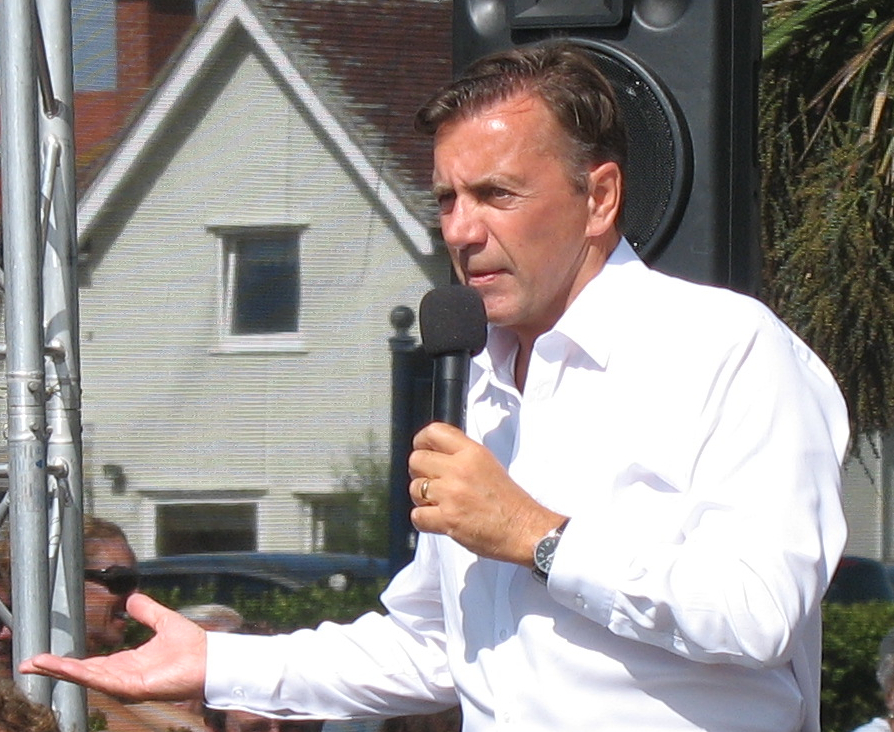
- Bannatyne in Felixstowe, 2009
- Born: Duncan Walker Bannatyne; 2 February 1949 (age 77); Clydebank, Scotland
- Occupations: Entrepreneur, investor, television presenter, philanthropist
- Known for: Dragons' Den
- Spouses: Gail Brodie (m. 1983; div. 1994) Joanne McCue (m. 2006; div. 2012) Nigora Whitehorn (m. 2017)
- Children: 6
- Military career
- Allegiance: United Kingdom
- Branch: Royal Navy
- Service years: 1964–1969

Duncan Walker Bannatyne, OBE (born 2 February 1949) is a Scottish entrepreneur, philanthropist, and author. His business interests include hotels, health clubs, spas, media, TV, and property. He is most famous for his appearance as a business angel on the BBC programme Dragons' Den. He was appointed an OBE for his contribution to charity. He has written seven books.

== Early life ==
Bannatyne was born in Dalmuir, west of Glasgow. His father Bill had served in the Argyll and Sutherland Highlanders in World War II, worked on the Burma Railway after being captured by the Japanese following the Fall of Singapore, and then worked in the foundry at the Clydebank Singer plant. As a child, Bannatyne lived in one room with his parents and siblings in a large house shared with six other families.

Bannatyne attended Dalmuir Primary School, where he displayed a talent for arithmetic, and won a place at Clydebank High School after passing the eleven-plus exam. Most pupils owned a bicycle so he resolved to earn the money to buy one for himself. The local newsagent was not interested in employing him so she challenged him to find 100 new customers in return for a paper round. He called her bluff by returning with 100 names, but later reflected that it would have been more entrepreneurial to have sold the list. He only enjoyed PE and woodwork at high school and left at 15 without any qualifications.

In 1964, after a few weeks working for a local cabinet-maker, Bannatyne joined the Royal Navy, initially enlisting for twelve years as a junior second class engineering mechanic (stoker) at RNTE Shotley near Ipswich, better known as the boys' training establishment HMS Ganges. He served in the Navy for several years including a spell on the aircraft carrier HMS Eagle, before throwing an officer off a boat landing jetty in Scotland and receiving a dishonourable discharge. In his autobiography he claims this was in part a reaction to this officer's abuse of his authority, in part a dare by his shipmates and in part a way of getting out of the Navy, with which he had become disillusioned. Bannatyne was nineteen when this happened. After the incident, he had to serve nine months in Colchester military detention centre.

== Career ==
Bannatyne spent his twenties moving from one job to another. Upon his return to Clydebank he trained as an agricultural vehicle fitter and then travelled around the country repairing tractors. He lived on the island of Jersey for four years from 1974 where he gained an HGV licence and earned a living through several jobs including deckchair attendant, ice cream seller and hospital porter. He also surfed, partied and met his first wife on the island. With Jersey's difficult business climate for outsiders, at age 29, Bannatyne and his wife moved to Stockton-on-Tees in North East England. He has stated that he was poor and did not have a bank account until the age of 30.

Bannatyne's business career began almost immediately after his move to Stockton-on-Tees with an ice cream van purchased for £450. He soon expanded by buying more vans during the period of the Glasgow Ice Cream Wars.

Bannatyne sold the business for £28,000, founding a nursing home business called Quality Care Homes which he then sold for £26 million in 1997 and children's nursery chain Just Learning for £12 million. The Just Learning chief executive during the 1992–97 period was Michael Fallon while out of office as an MP.

Bannatyne then expanded into health clubs, with the Bannatyne Health Club & Spa chain to his name, and also hotels and property. He acquired 26 health clubs from Hilton Hotels in August 2006 at a price of £92 million. The Bannatyne Group is now the largest independent chain of health clubs in the United Kingdom with 69 sites. As of February 2025, Bannatyne has 69 health clubs, 45 spas and three hotels across the UK. The health club and spa at Humberston, North East Lincolnshire contains a WHS-rated golf course, whose 9 greens each have two holes.

Bannatyne's wealth was estimated at £280 million by the Sunday Times Rich List in 2018.

Bannatyne has written seven books: Anyone Can Do It, Wake Up and Change Your Life, How to be Smart With Your Money, How to be Smart With Your Time, 43 Mistakes Businesses Make, 37 Questions Everyone in Business Needs to Answer, and Riding The Storm.

=== Television ===
From 2005 until 2015, Bannatyne was a Dragon on the BBC television series Dragons' Den. During his time on the show he invested in 36 businesses. He departed from the show following the twelfth series, alongside fellow Dragons Kelly Hoppen and Piers Linney, and they were replaced by Nick Jenkins, Touker Suleyman and Sarah Willingham.

In 2015, Bannatyne took part in the fifteenth series of I'm a Celebrity...Get Me Out of Here! finishing in seventh place. His fee for taking part in the show was donated to the Operation Smile charity.

In 2020, Bannatyne took part in the BBC series The Real Marigold Hotel. He joined other celebrities including Britt Ekland, Henry Blofeld, John Altman, Susie Blake, and Barbara Dickson.

=== Charity works ===
Bannatyne received his OBE partly in recognition for his work with charities such as Mary's meals. He has funded several projects over a ten-year period in Romania, including Casa Bannatyne in Târgu-Mureş, a hospice for orphans with HIV and AIDS in which he invested £80,000. He established the Bannatyne Charitable Trust in March 2008.

On 19 May 2008, Bannatyne added his support to the launch of the Geared for Giving Campaign at the House of Commons to encourage UK business leaders to set up and promote a Workplace Giving scheme to benefit UK registered charities with tax effective donations through employees' pay. He then helped to promote Clydesdale Bank's and Yorkshire Bank's efforts to promote the programme through ATM (Automated Teller Machine) rolls. "They are really going for it, over 20 per cent of their employees are giving money through this system", Bannatyne says.

On 29 August 2008, Bannatyne appeared on television programme Who Wants to Be a Millionaire?, raising £20,000 for charity NCH.

He became President of the charity No Smoking Day in October 2008. The charity runs the annual health awareness campaign – helping people who want to stop smoking. This followed on from him making a documentary about the ethics of British American Tobacco.

In August 2010, he agreed to become Patron of PC David Rathband's Blue Lamp Foundation, a charity established by the Northumbria Police Constable David Rathband, who was blinded by gunshot wounds in the 2010 Northumbria Police manhunt.

== Political activity ==
Bannatyne supported the Conservative Party when Margaret Thatcher was its leader from 1975 to 1990, but defected to the Labour Party during the leadership of Tony Blair from 1994 to 2007. He continued to support Labour under Blair's successor, Gordon Brown, who led Labour from 2007 to 2010. He also donated to Labour under Blair and voiced support for Brown, despite criticising Brown's ministry for being involved in what he described as "petty squabbles based on personal ambition".

In March 2011, Bannatyne appeared to defect back to the Conservatives when he supported certain measures imposed by Conservative chancellor George Osborne, even though he had mocked the Conservative government a few months earlier.

In April 2015, one week after signing a letter to The Daily Telegraph supporting the Conservatives in the upcoming general election, he reversed his position and pledged his vote to Labour due to its leader Ed Miliband's "courage" in promising to scrap non-domiciled tax status.

In June 2016, Bannatyne voted for Brexit in the European Union membership referendum.

In April 2025, Bannatyne called for gyms to exclude transgender women from changing rooms after For Women Scotland v The Scottish Ministers.

In May 2026, Bannatyne endorsed the candidate for Restore Britain, Rebecca Shepherd, in the Makerfield by-election.

== Personal life ==
Bannatyne resides in Portugal, where he married Nigora Whitehorn on 3 June 2017. Bannatyne has four children by his first wife, Gail (m. 1983): Hollie, Abigail, Jennifer and Eve; two with his second wife, Joanne (m. 2006): Emily (b. 1999) and Thomas (b. 2002). He has several grandchildren from his eldest daughter.

Bannatyne was awarded an honorary doctorate of science by Glasgow Caledonian University on 5 July 2006 for services to business and charity. He was also awarded an honorary doctorate of business administration from Teesside University, on 6 February 2009.

Bannatyne's 60th birthday was celebrated in London, with celebrities including David Coulthard, James Caan, Theo Paphitis, and Anna Ryder Richardson. A second party was held in the North East of England and was headlined by UK soul singer Beverley Knight and featured Chesney Hawkes, with the festivities occurring in a converted warehouse in Darlington, County Durham.

Bannatyne openly discussed having had cosmetic surgery under his eyes on The Graham Norton Show; had an acting role in the Tyne Tees Television comedy pilot Girl's Club where amongst other actors, he performed alongside the actress Georgia Taylor. In 2011, he stated that he suffers from prosopagnosia, which makes it difficult to recognise familiar faces.
