= Lumby Junction, British Columbia =

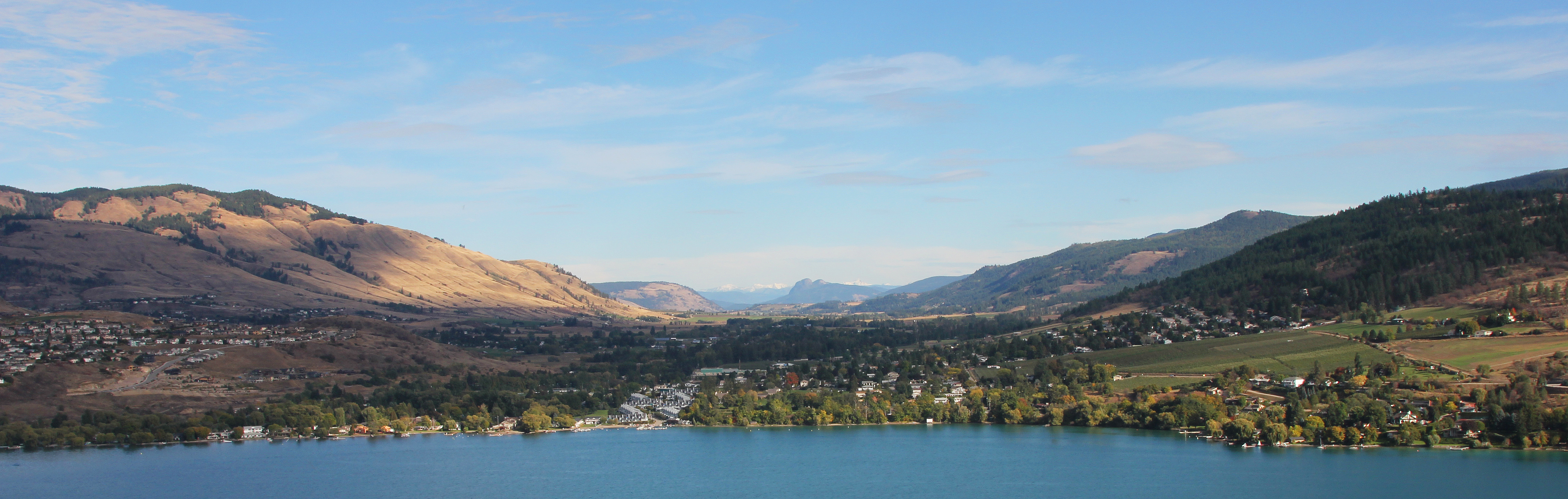
Kalamalka Lake, BC, where Lumby Junction runs

Lumby Junction is a railway point in Osoyoos Division Yale Land District, British Columbia, Canada, near the north end of Kalamalka Lake, at coordinates 50°14′N 119°16′W. Lumby Junction is on the Kelowna Pacific Railway, which operated over railway lines leased from Canadian National Railway Company until Kelowna Pacific entered receivership and ceased operations on June 6, 2013.

On September 26, 2013, Canadian National announced that it had reached agreements with a major shipper and two locals of the Teamsters union that would allow CN to resume operations over most of the Kelowna Pacific. CN said it planned to abandon the line between Lumby Junction and Kelowna.
