= United Arab Emirates foreign aid =

Foreign aid from the United Arab Emirates is provided in the form of assistance, grants and loans through both the government and nongovernmental organizations. These projects provided to other countries deal with healthcare, infrastructure, development, alleviating poverty, responding to natural disasters, refugees and internally displaced people.

== Objectives ==
The purpose of UAE aid is to increase international peace and stability through the eradication of poverty, while guaranteeing improvements in the living standards of individuals regardless of their religion, language, identity and race. Aid is continually provided to ensure the establishment of effective partnerships. The UAE is also committed in executing sustainable development programs in order to support developing countries reach their Millennium Development Goals (MDGs). A report published for 2017-2021 focuses on country's specific development plans and their priorities of the Sustainable Development Goals (SDGs) the UAE also hopes to focus on neglected issues and communities. Another guiding principle is to have aid transparent and focused on results.

== History ==
Foreign aid first began with one of the oldest development agencies in the UAE, called Abu Dhabi Fund for Development, founded in 1971. Abu Dhabi Fund for Development (ADFD) assists countries through economic support in the form of concessionary loans to reach sustainable socio-economic progress.

== Administration ==
In February 2006, Sheikh Abdullah bin Zayed Al Nahyan was appointed as Minister of Foreign Affairs. Following a restructure of the cabinet in 2016 led to the creation of the Ministry of Foreign Affairs and International Cooperation, where one of its several tasks is to overlook development aid by the UAE. The UAE's official development assistance (ODA) measured as a share of Gross National Income achieved 1.17% in 2014 and 1.12% in 2016. This is higher than the United Nations' agreement for countries to give 0.7% of their gross national income (GNI) as official development aid yearly, ranking the UAE as highest contributor of all countries reporting to the OECD Development Assistance Committee (DAC). The UAE also provides funding that falls beyond the scope of Official Development Assistance. According to the OECD, 2020 official development assistance from UAE decreased by 26.3% to US$1.7 billion.

== Regions ==
While other countries have received aid from the United Arab Emirates, these countries within the two continents have been particularly focused on.

=== Africa ===
==== Egypt ====
From 1971 to 2014 the UAE's humanitarian and development aid to Egypt equaled to US$12.8 billion . In 2013, the largest receiver of the UAE's government development aid was directed to Egypt. In that same year, an agreement was created aimed at supporting the economy and financial system. Many different sectors were targeted, including agriculture, transport, health, education, infrastructure development, water and sanitation that have all contributed to the recovery of Egypt.

==== Sudan ====
From 2014 to 2015 there has been a sevenfold increase of UAE assistance in Sudan, which received US$108.2 million. The sectors focused on were general program assistance, agriculture and education. The aid was equally divided between loans and grants. For the agriculture sector, assistance was mostly provided by the Abu Dhabi Fund for Development to help secure drinking water, increase the size of lands and provide extra electricity through hydraulic generation. For education, the Al Maktoum Foundation donated to support the costs of the International University of Africa.

=== Asia ===
==== Afghanistan ====
The UAE's mission of delivering humanitarian aid to the Afghan people since 2003 has been to maintain security and support social and economic development in remote areas. All of the funds received from the UAE were provided in the form of grants, focusing on infrastructure development, health, humanitarian and emergency relief. The Government has provided US$30million specifically for reconstruction efforts with the UAE Red Crescent investing US$19million in local projects. Additionally, the Abu Dhabi Fund for Development has spent US$29 million for the execution of 40,000 social housing units. Some of the contributions include:

- 11 schools educating 300 students a day
- 1 public library serving more than 400 people
- 6 medical clinics that have treated 35,000 Afghani's
- 38 mosques each serving 300 people
- 160 wells providing drinking water

In January 2017, diplomats were expected to initiate several UAE-backed projects including humanitarian, educational and developmental as part of an aid program. One particular project in the city of Kabul was signing an agreement with Kardan University to offer scholarships funded by the UAE. During that trip five of the UAE officials were killed in a bomb attack in Kandahar, the southern of Afghanistan. Survivors stated that the bombs were hidden under sofas in the governor's guesthouse. The UAE's ambassador to Afghanistan was one of the six killed. The UAE leaders have responded to this act of terror by stating they will not be discouraged and the UAE's humanitarian efforts will not stop.

==== Iraq ====
Assistance by the UAE to Iraq added up to US$134.9million in 2015, five times greater than 2014. The specific sector focused on was humanitarian and aid emergency relief whereby the government delivered relief supplies to Kurdistan. Several humanitarian projects were also executed by the Emirates Red Crescent in Erbil that consisted of providing medical supplies and winter arrangements for Syrian refugees.

==== Jordan ====
In 2015, Jordan was provided with US$230.6 million where 99% were presented as grants. Through the Abu Dhabi Fund for Development US$128 million was specifically intended for transport and storage. Improvements include expanding roads, building facilities for oil product storage and supporting the Amman Development Pass Project.
The Emirates Red Crescent mostly provided the humanitarian relief by administering the Mrajeeb Al Fhood camp to ensure meeting the needs of Syrian refugees through, food, shelter and health aid.

==== Pakistan ====
Over 44 years Pakistan has been a receiver of UAE aid through development and humanitarian programs costing US$320 million. Crucial contributors were the Abu Dhabi Fund for Development and Khalifa bin Zayed Al Nahyan Foundation. In addition to reconstructing infrastructure, there has been a partnership with the Bill and Melinda Gates Foundations of delivering and provisioning 20,000 vaccines for Pakistani children against measles and polio.

==== Syria ====
The UAE has provided US$583 million in response to assisting the 1.5 million internally displaced people both in Syria and in host countries for refugees. The UAE has guaranteed US$460 million during all three International Humanitarian Pledging Conferences for Syria held in Kuwait. UAE aid delivered to Syria is through different organizations such as the UN, UNICEF, UNHCR, WFP and WHO. Humanitarian projects inside Syria cost US$67.8 million, while the largest project received US$15.6 million towards the Syria Recovery Trust Fund that provides necessary supplies such as water, food, medical care and energy. Additionally, the Abu Dhabi Fund for Development provided food assistance to IDPs as well as Palestinian refugees in Syria. Another project funded was to support the nutrition of children under the age of five and nourishing pregnant women inside Syria.

==== Yemen ====
Since 2011 Yemen has remained as a high recipient of UAE aid where US$908 million has been donated to help with reconstruction while also supporting different sectors such as education, health, food aid and economic recovery. The President Sheikh Khalifa bin Zayed Al Nahyan has promised to contribute to food aid for 1 million people for the next three years. This initiative has reached more than 75,000 families while also benefiting the local economy.
A large contributor towards education programs was Dubai Cares, hoping to benefit 46,000 children while improving the quality of education.
