= List of sovereign states by official development assistance received =

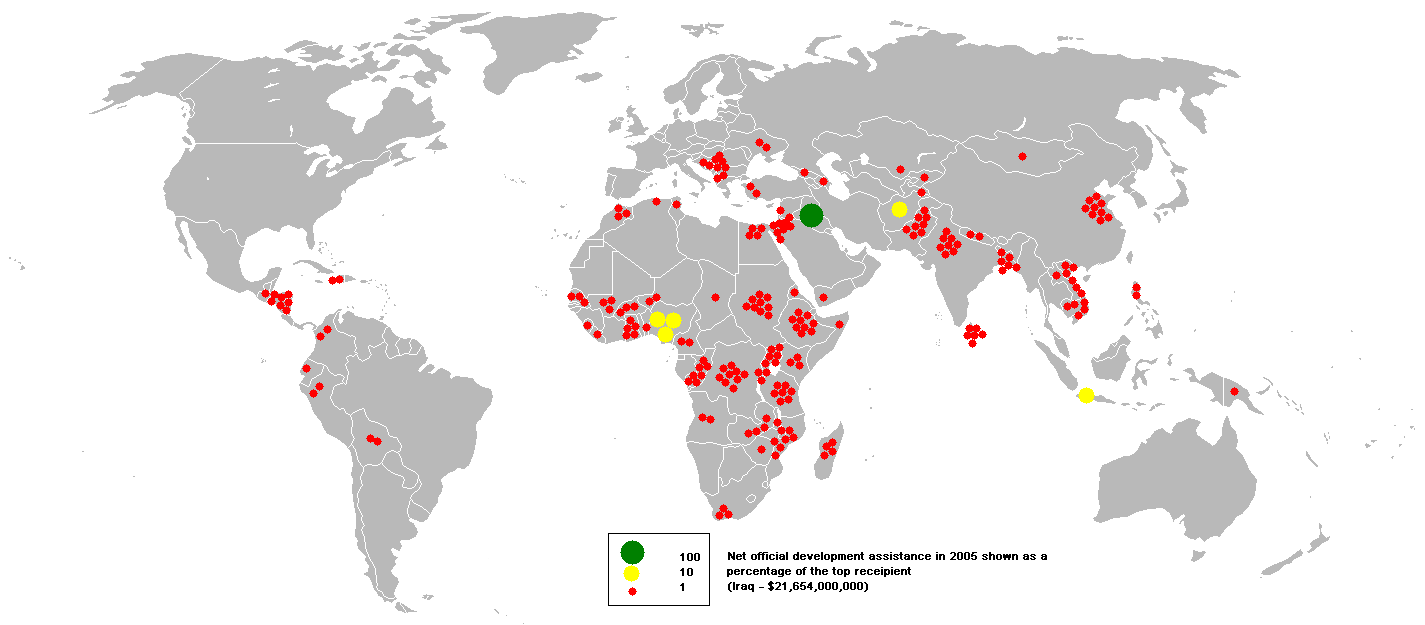
A map of official development assistance distribution in 2005

This is a list of countries based on the official development assistance (ODA) they have received for the given year. More comprehensive and current lists are available from the OECD (Table DAC2a) and the World Bank (Net official development assistance and official aid received (current US$)).

The figures shown are based on OECD measures and definitions of international aid. Amounts are in "current U.S. dollars", i.e. amounts paid at the time, not adjusted for later or earlier inflation or currency movements.

Countries like Argentina, Australia, Belgium, Brazil, Bulgaria, Canada, Chile, Croatia, the Czech Republic, Denmark, Estonia, Finland, France, Germany, Greece, Hungary, Ireland, Israel, Italy, Japan, Latvia, Lithuania, Mexico, the Netherlands, New Zealand, Slovakia, Slovenia, Spain, Sweden and the United States, which send assistance to other developing countries, as well as least developed, poor or low-income countries, do not receive the assistance. Developing countries like Algeria, Egypt, India, Malaysia, Morocco, South Africa, Thailand and Turkey, which receive assistance from developed countries, sometimes send the assistance. Other developing countries, like Iran and Pakistan, both of which receive assistance from developed countries, rarely send the assistance.

== List ==
Official development assistance (ODA) received in millions of US dollars (2022)
Country	ODA received (millions of USD)
Afghanistan	3,839.27
Albania	315.51
Algeria	214.99
Angola	97.48
Armenia	300.35
Azerbaijan	47.17
Bangladesh	5,192.79
Belarus	16.31
Belize	20.38
Benin	844.37
Bhutan	194.44
Bolivia	334.11
Bosnia-Herzegovina	283.90
Botswana	89.52
Burkina Faso	1,394.81
Burundi	576.59
Cambodia	1,546.94
Cameroon	1,177.57
Cape Verde	82.54
Central African Republic	683.06
Chad	694.12
China	–282.32
Colombia	1,883.31
Comoros	137.28
Congo, Dem. Rep.	3,249.77
Congo, Rep.	707.53
Costa Rica	639.89
Côte d'Ivoire	1,974.45
Cuba	137.49
Djibouti	59.17
Dominica	59.52
Dominican Republic	367.00
Ecuador	376.18
Egypt	5,817.10
El Salvador	707.97
Equatorial Guinea	11.18
Eritrea	54.71
Eswatini	96.62
Ethiopia	4,925.60
Fiji	358.05
Gabon	133.26
Gambia	272.68
Georgia	375.91
Ghana	1,045.64
Grenada	–93.64
Guatemala	437.75
Guinea	499.63
Guinea-Bissau	148.64
Guyana	198.98
Haiti	890.72
Honduras	785.44
India	2,831.24
Indonesia	662.70
Iran	289.59
Iraq	1,569.81
Jamaica	95.14
Jordan	1,985.74
Kazakhstan	73.82
Kenya	2,652.01
Kiribati	91.10
North Korea	12.83
Kosovo	381.38
Kyrgyzstan	729.70
Laos	547.74
Lebanon	1,426.09
Lesotho	153.29
Liberia	484.75
Libya	263.95
Madagascar	999.89
Malawi	1,345.24
Malaysia	4.89
Maldives	119.12
Mali	1,198.29
Marshall Islands	140.34
Mauritania	327.73
Mauritius	76.20
Micronesia, Federated States of	150.39
Moldova	884.50
Mongolia	284.55
Montenegro	102.72
Morocco	1,414.80
Mozambique	2,558.69
Myanmar	1,003.34
Namibia	325.31
Nauru	35.49
Nepal	1,208.22
Nicaragua	1,127.26
Niger	2,035.04
Nigeria	4,443.26
North Macedonia	224.05
Pakistan	1,841.03
Palau	55.67
Palestine	2,236.19
Panama	130.17
Papua New Guinea	661.17
Paraguay	96.72
Peru	829.35
Philippines	1,612.48
Rwanda	1,076.82
Samoa	126.27
São Tomé and Príncipe	53.13
Senegal	1,451.84
Serbia	510.13
Sierra Leone	523.47
Solomon Islands	252.73
Somalia	1,937.76
South Africa	1,028.58
South Sudan	2,077.15
Sri Lanka	11.05
St. Lucia	33.41
Saint Vincent and the Grenadines	15.49
Sudan	1,558.41
Suriname	54.78
Syria	8,277.42
Tajikistan	589.00
Tanzania	2,661.90
Thailand	554.00
Timor-Leste	223.56
Togo	429.57
Tonga	295.05
Tunisia	1,212.29
Turkey	800.27
Turkmenistan	15.09
Tuvalu	63.56
Uganda	2,113.84
Ukraine	28,732.43
Uzbekistan	1,591.82
Vanuatu	125.06
Venezuela	272.25
Vietnam	48.92
Yemen	3,636.91
Zambia	1,829.95
Zimbabwe	782.29
World	242,061

== Historical data ==
Official development assistance received in millions of US dollars
Continent	Country	2012	2013	2015	2019
Asia	Afghanistan	6,725.0	5,265.95	4,237.29	4,284.41
Europe	Albania	341.6	298.38	333.58	28.41
Africa	Algeria	144.5	207.96	87.49	175.72
Africa	Angola	242.3	287.61	380.06	49.54
Americas	Antigua & Barbuda	2.3	1.5	1.49	27.44
Europe	Armenia	272.7	292.76	347.48	419.73
Europe	Azerbaijan	284.9	-63.13	69.62	120.98
Asia	Bangladesh	2,152.0	2,669.1	2,570.1	4,482.60
Europe	Belarus	103.2	104.68	104.58	214.23
Americas	Belize	25.1	49.55	28.27	37.66
Africa	Benin	511.3	652.61	430.14	602.21
Asia	Bhutan	161.2	134.69	97.28	181.41
Americas	Bolivia	658.6	699.15	791.31	716.13
Europe	Bosnia-Herzegovina	571.1	550.04	355.03	464.51
Africa	Botswana	73.8	108.38	65.54	68.86
Africa	Burkina Faso	1,158.5	1,040.11	996.99	1,148.81
Africa	Burundi	522.7	546.27	366.54	588.94
Asia	Cambodia	807.4	804.81	679.04	984.07
Africa	Cameroon	596.2	737.49	663.08	1,335.21
Africa	Cape Verde	246.1	243.37		152.53
Africa	Central African Republic	227.2	189.25	486.73	753.84
Africa	Chad	478.5	399.33	606.65	707.05
Americas	Colombia	764.4	852.03	1,355.86	902.53
Africa	Comoros	68.6	81.9	65.78	78.24
Africa	Congo, Dem. Rep.	2,859.3	2,572.2	2,599.04	3,025.53
Africa	Congo, Rep.	138.6	150.4	88.88	187.27
Americas	Costa Rica	32.7	37.77	111.30	59.76
Africa	Côte d'Ivoire	2,635.6	1,262	653.06	1,201.23
Americas	Cuba	87.8	101.24	552.73	499.66
Africa	Djibouti	146.5	152.95	169.56	272.48
Americas	Dominica	25.6	19.8	11.71	51.39
Americas	Dominican Republic	261.3	148.13	279.96	134.44
Americas	Ecuador	149.4	147.8	318.16	525.05
Africa	Egypt	1,806.6	5,505	2,499.43	1,740.59
Americas	El Salvador	230.4	171.3	89.70	305.64
Africa	Equatorial Guinea	14.2	5.7	7.49	64.07
Africa	Eritrea	133.7	83.69	94.12	276.92
Africa	Ethiopia	3,261.3	3,826.2	3,233.71	4,809.97
Oceania	Fiji	107.3	90.9	102.48	139.07
Africa	Gabon	73.2	90.8	98.78	116.71
Africa	Gambia	138.8	110.8	107.68	194.04
Europe	Georgia	662.2	652.7	448.93	496.73
Africa	Ghana	1,807.9	1,330.5	1,768.69	936.32
Americas	Grenada	7.6	10	24.1	14.68
Americas	Guatemala	299.4	494.1	411.29	393.85
Africa	Guinea	339.6	499.5	538.04	580.68
Africa	Guinea-Bissau	98.9	103.6	95.04	120.51
Americas	Guyana	114.4	101.8	32.14	113.27
Americas	Haiti	1,275.1	1,170.5	1,045.86	726.46
Americas	Honduras	571.5	627.6	540.52	457.57
Asia	India	1,667.63	2,435.68	3,174.35	2,610.58
Asia	Indonesia	67.8	53.3	-33.4	-629.95
Middle East	Iran	148.8	131.3	110.90	210.40
Middle East	Iraq	1,300.7	1,541.4	1,482.94	2,211.90
Americas	Jamaica	21.0	70.3	59.07	127.07
Middle East	Jordan	1,416.9	1,407.9	2,151.85	2,797.18
Asia	Kazakhstan	129.6	91.3	82.50	54.41
Africa	Kenya	2,654.0	3,236.2	2,464.18	3,250.97
Oceania	Kiribati	64.6	64.4	64.95	56.66
Asia	North Korea	98.1	109	131.43	151.29
Europe	Kosovo	567.6		437.81	345.26
Asia	Kyrgyzstan	472.9	536.6	769.99	448.71
Asia	Laos	408.9	421	471.09	631.51
Middle East	Lebanon	710.2	626.4	974.92	1,525.49
Africa	Lesotho	282.6	320	83.14	145.98
Africa	Liberia	570.9	534.2	1,094.43	597.31
Africa	Libya	87.0	129.4	157.37	316.01
Africa	Madagascar	378.6	499.7	676.97	756.17
Africa	Malawi	1,174.6	1,125.8	1,049.38	1,206.22
Asia	Malaysia	15.3	-119.4	-600	5.99
Asia	Maldives	58.0	22.9	26.83	72.08
Africa	Mali	1,001.3	1,391.3	1,204.13	1,863.21
Oceania	Marshall Islands	76.0	93.7	57.06	65.97
Africa	Mauritania	408.3	291.2	318.0	412.17
Africa	Mauritius	177.8	148.3	78.42	22.18
Oceania	Micronesia, Federated States of	115.0	142.9	81.39	92.54
Europe	Moldova	473.0	374.4	312.58	342.69
Asia	Mongolia	448.7	428.2	236.34	314.53
Europe	Montenegro	103.2	127.3	99.96	96.94
Africa	Morocco	1,480.3	1,966.1	1,481.43	757.86
Africa	Mozambique	2,096.9	2,314.1	1,814.74	1,907.78
Asia	Myanmar	504.0	3,934.8	1,168.5	2,079.93
Africa	Namibia	264.8	261.7	142.38	148.41
Oceania	Nauru			31.25	54.33
Asia	Nepal	769.7	870.5	1,224.78	1,360.74
Americas	Nicaragua	532.3	496.6	457.92	389.24
Africa	Niger	901.8	773.1	867.99	1,490.35
Africa	Nigeria	1,915.8	2,529.4	2,431.5	3,517.32
Europe	North Macedonia	148.9	251.6	214.32	141.80
Asia	Pakistan	2,019.0	2,174.1	3,747.5	2,170.74
Oceania	Palau	15.0	35.2	13.93	24.94
Asia	Palestine			1,871.21	2,234.33
Americas	Panama	50.7	6.8	10.25	71.46
Asia	Papua New Guinea	664.8	656.2	591.39	667.34
Americas	Paraguay	104.4	129.4	60.18	129.88
Americas	Peru	393.8	367.5	334.83	475.90
Asia	Philippines			515.31	905.38
Africa	Rwanda	878.9	1,081.1	1,085.33	1,191.10
Oceania	Samoa	120.6	118.1	93.72	123.72
Africa	São Tomé and Príncipe	48.7	51.7	48.95	51.37
Africa	Senegal	1,080.1	982.8	879.12	1,443.88
Europe	Serbia	1,089.8	783.2	312.48	570.70
Africa	Seychelles	35.3	25.4	6.78	
Africa	Sierra Leone	442.8	443.7	946.33	594.64
Oceania	Solomon Islands	304.9	288.3	190.03	223.89
Africa	Somalia	998.6	991.9	1,253.37	1,865.58
Africa	South Africa	1,067.1	1,292.9	1,420.27	971.48
Africa	South Sudan	1,578.0	1,447.4	1,674.83	1,885.27
Asia	Sri Lanka	487.5	423.2	427.23	197.35
Americas	St. Kitts & Nevis	21.9	29.3		
Americas	St. Lucia	26.8	24.3	13.76	32.11
Americas	Saint Vincent and the Grenadines	8.5	7.5	13.5	84.48
Africa	Sudan	983.2	1,163.1	899.78	1,624.67
Americas	Suriname	39.6	29.8	15.98	23.38
Africa	Swaziland	88.1	115.9	93.63	73.40
Middle East	Syria	1,671.5	3,626.7	4,889.74	10,249.81
Asia	Tajikistan	393.9	382.2	426.35	366.56
Africa	Tanzania	2,831.8	3,430.2	2,582.24	2,153.14
Asia	Thailand	-134.7	-23.7	58.67	-338.20
Asia	Timor-Leste	283.0	257.8	212.29	235.93
Africa	Togo	241.4	220.5	199.59	411.62
Oceania	Tonga	78.2	80.3	68.40	107.95
Africa	Tunisia	1,017.0	713.6	474.54	984.03
Asia	Turkey	3,033.1	2,740.5	2,145.22	824.90
Asia	Turkmenistan	38.0	37.3	23.62	25.36
Oceania	Tuvalu	24.4	26.6	49.65	36.48
Africa	Uganda	1,655.1	1,692.5	1,628.2	2,100.01
Europe	Ukraine	769.2	800.7	1,449.35	1,148.25
Americas	Uruguay	19.3	35.7	23.18	
Asia	Uzbekistan	255.2	292.5	447.81	1,156.44
Oceania	Vanuatu	101.4	90.5	186.56	130.59
Americas	Venezuela	48.1	35.4	36.59	284.00
Asia	Vietnam	4,115.7	4,084.7	3,157.36	1,094.63
Middle East	Yemen	709.3	1,003.5	1,531.38	4,396.52
Africa	Zambia	957.7	1,142.4	797.14	976.28
Africa	Zimbabwe	1,001.2	811	788.29	974.89
Africa	[Total]	46,003.5	51,314.22	44,744.97	52,880.57
Europe	[Total]	5,439.9	4,172.63	4,485.72	4,390.23
Asia	[Total]	25,970.5	28,683.23	27,860.08	26,573.07
Americas	[Total]	7,059	5,864.87	6,619.66	6,583.05
Middle East	[Total]	11,258.7	8,337.2	11,141.73	21,391.3
Oceania	[Total]	1,007.4	1,030.9	1,030.9	1,056.14
World	[Total]	96,739.2	99,403.05	151,368	166,053.5

== See also ==
- List of governments by development aid
- United States foreign aid
