= Payroll giving =

Tax free way for UK taxpayers to give money to UK Registered Charities

Payroll Giving, Workplace Giving or Give As You Earn (GAYE) is a scheme for UK taxpayers to donate money to UK Registered Charities.

Introduced in 1987, Payroll Giving allows employees to make donations to the UK registered charity of their choice directly from their gross pay, with no tax deduction for the charity to claim back.

Some companies have put in place a matching gift program to match or part match their employee donations via Payroll Giving.

== Administration ==
Over 8,500 employers in the UK currently operate the Payroll Giving scheme, with approximately 2% of UK employees participating. Participating employers deduct agreed sums of money from their employees' pay before tax calculation and forward the funds to a payroll giving agency. The agency then distributes the donations to registered UK charities based on the employees' preferences, deducting an administration fee, which may vary between agencies. Some employers cover this fee on behalf of their employees.

Payroll giving is operated by several agencies which do the administration and processing to link the donations to the correct charities. Employers have to choose which agency to operate with and may not pay the charities directly.

Payroll Giving is promoted within workplaces by a number of Professional Fundraising Organizations or charities.

== Effects ==
=== On donors ===
The UK has a progressive Income Tax system with a top rate in 2015 of 45%. For higher rate tax payers this is a simpler way to donate to charity tax effectively than Gift Aid, as Gift Aid assumes all donations are from Basic rate Taxpayers (20% rate).

It is nonetheless possible to achieve the same result using Gift Aid, regardless of which tax band the donor is in, because the Gift Aid scheme allows higher rate taxpayers to reclaim the difference between higher and basic rate taxes. For example, if a donor gives £80 via Gift Aid, this is equivalent to donating £100 via Payroll Giving. In both cases, the benefit to the charity is £100 (disregarding the Transitional Relief payable until April 2011). The cost to a basic rate taxpayer is £80 in both cases, as the £100 paid by Payroll Giving would otherwise have been taxed at 20%. The cost to a higher rate taxpayer is £60 for the Payroll Giving donation (£100 less 40%), and initially £80 for the Gift Aid donation, although the higher rate taxpayer can later reclaim the £20 difference through his/her tax return.

=== On employers ===
As part of a broader corporate social responsibility policy, Payroll Giving offers employees the opportunity to support social causes while demonstrating the company's commitment to social responsibility. Employers with high participation rates can win Bronze, Silver and Gold awards from the Government. From 2012 the Government is also introducing a Platinum Quality Mark Award.

=== On charities ===
Charities recognized by HMRC benefit from receiving tax-free donations through Payroll Giving, and in some cases matched by employees.
