= List of countries by gross national savings =

This is a list of countries by gross national savings. Gross national saving is derived by deducting final consumption expenditure from gross national disposable income, and consists of personal saving, plus business saving, plus government saving, but excludes foreign saving. A negative number indicates that the economy as a whole is spending more income than it produces, thus drawing down national wealth.

== Gross savings ==
Gross savings (World Bank)
| Country / Territory | Gross savings | | | | Year |
| Country / Territory | Millions US$ | Billions LCU | % of GDP | % of GNI | Year |
|---|---|---|---|---|---|
| China | 7,762,565 | 54,990 | 42.49 | 42.84 | 2023 |
| United States | 5,294,183 | 5,294 | 18.14 | 18.10 | 2024 |
| Japan | 1,263,080 | 177,451 | 29.98 | 28.30 | 2023 |
| Germany | 1,257,895 | 1,162 | 26.99 | 26.06 | 2024 |
| India | 1,174,154 | 99,339 | 30.01 | 30.45 | 2024 |
| France | 685,981 | 634 | 21.69 | 21.24 | 2024 |
| Russia | 665,766 | 61,606 | 30.63 | 31.03 | 2024 |
| South Korea | 578,721 | 755,614 | 33.79 | 33.17 | 2023 |
| United Kingdom | 560,101 | 438 | 15.37 | 15.51 | 2024 |
| Italy | 551,784 | 510 | 23.25 | 23.40 | 2024 |
| Indonesia | 483,917 | 7,672,718 | 34.66 | 35.60 | 2024 |
| Canada | 479,455 | 657 | 21.39 | 21.72 | 2024 |
| Australia | 405,384 | 618 | 23.14 | 23.94 | 2024 |
| Spain | 404,794 | 374 | 23.50 | 23.62 | 2024 |
| Saudi Arabia | 366,918 | 1,376 | 29.65 | 29.50 | 2024 |
| Netherlands | 358,757 | 331 | 29.23 | 29.64 | 2024 |
| Mexico | 352,431 | 6,451 | 19.02 | 19.61 | 2024 |
| Turkey | 325,853 | 10,690 | 24.63 | 24.92 | 2024 |
| Brazil | 315,383 | 1,700 | 14.47 | 14.93 | 2024 |
| Switzerland | 303,157 | 267 | 32.37 | 33.44 | 2024 |
| Singapore | 220,468 | 295 | 40.28 | 48.10 | 2024 |
| Norway | 199,145 | 2,140 | 41.17 | 39.32 | 2024 |
| Sweden | 193,027 | 2,040 | 31.64 | 30.31 | 2024 |
| Ireland | 191,961 | 178 | 34.81 | 45.71 | 2023 |
| Poland | 163,375 | 650 | 17.86 | 18.48 | 2024 |
| Belgium | 159,467 | 147 | 24.00 | 23.59 | 2024 |
| Bangladesh | 154,704 | 17,194 | 34.37 | 32.95 | 2024 |
| Vietnam | 150,427 | 3,578,244 | 34.67 | 36.57 | 2023 |
| Denmark | 148,879 | 1,026 | 34.67 | 33.52 | 2024 |
| Israel | 144,275 | 534 | 26.70 | 26.91 | 2024 |
| Qatar | 135,408 | 493 | 57.45 | 59.52 | 2022 |
| Philippines | 134,977 | 7,733 | 29.24 | 25.87 | 2024 |
| Austria | 129,804 | 120 | 24.88 | 24.80 | 2024 |
| Thailand | 126,563 | 4,467 | 24.04 | 24.73 | 2024 |
| Hong Kong | 116,572 | 910 | 28.63 | 26.16 | 2024 |
| Iraq | 116,481 | 153,260 | 43.32 | 43.16 | 2023 |
| Algeria | 100,447 | 13,645 | 40.56 | 41.16 | 2023 |
| Malaysia | 99,320 | 455 | 23.54 | 24.31 | 2024 |
| Argentina | 96,196 | 87,990 | 15.19 | 15.50 | 2024 |
| Czech Republic | 95,838 | 2,225 | 27.78 | 29.04 | 2024 |
| Kuwait | 93,727 | 28.70 | 51.08 | 44.74 | 2022 |
| Chile | 71,863 | 67,808 | 21.76 | 22.94 | 2024 |
| Kazakhstan | 70,302 | 32,069 | 26.85 | 29.89 | 2023 |
| Finland | 67,145 | 62.03 | 22.39 | 22.31 | 2024 |
| Portugal | 66,792 | 61.71 | 21.64 | 22.04 | 2024 |
| Peru | 63,233 | 237 | 21.86 | 23.21 | 2024 |
| Romania | 61,005 | 281 | 15.94 | 16.37 | 2024 |
| Egypt | 58,559 | 1,502 | 14.79 | 15.47 | 2023 |
| Hungary | 57,855 | 21,157 | 25.96 | 26.65 | 2024 |
| Colombia | 57,851 | 235,711 | 13.82 | 14.11 | 2024 |
| South Africa | 53,305 | 977 | 13.32 | 13.59 | 2024 |
| Pakistan | 51,184 | 14,490 | 13.72 | 14.06 | 2024 |
| New Zealand | 43,347 | 70.59 | 16.99 | 17.59 | 2023 |
| Morocco | 40,782 | 413 | 28.24 | 28.65 | 2023 |
| Uzbekistan | 32,523 | 411,486 | 28.29 | 28.01 | 2024 |
| Oman | 30,947 | 11.90 | 29.22 | 30.74 | 2023 |
| Panama | 30,097 | 30.10 | 36.12 | 37.96 | 2023 |
| Ecuador | 29,809 | 29.81 | 23.91 | 24.57 | 2024 |
| Greece | 29,514 | 27.27 | 11.48 | 11.74 | 2024 |
| Dominican Republic | 29,203 | 1,739 | 23.50 | 24.84 | 2024 |
| Tanzania | 28,496 | 67,879 | 36.04 | 36.74 | 2023 |
| Ethiopia | 27,298 | 1,326 | 21.53 | 21.63 | 2022 |
| Slovakia | 24,608 | 22.74 | 17.36 | 17.76 | 2024 |
| Angola | 24,056 | 24,273 | 29.92 | 32.59 | 2024 |
| Guatemala | 22,186 | 172 | 19.60 | 19.88 | 2024 |
| Sri Lanka | 21,849 | 7,156 | 26.10 | 26.92 | 2023 |
| Ukraine | 21,610 | 868 | 11.33 | 11.31 | 2024 |
| Macao | 21,467 | 173 | 46.87 | 48.11 | 2023 |
| Bulgaria | 21,169 | 38.27 | 18.87 | 19.81 | 2024 |
| Croatia | 21,084 | 19.48 | 22.79 | 22.70 | 2024 |
| Azerbaijan | 20,339 | 34.58 | 27.37 | 28.41 | 2024 |
| DR Congo | 19,745 | 48,261 | 29.47 | 30.42 | 2023 |
| Lithuania | 19,416 | 17.94 | 22.88 | 23.46 | 2024 |
| Slovenia | 18,763 | 17.34 | 25.89 | 26.19 | 2024 |
| Nepal | 18,656 | 2,482 | 43.47 | 42.77 | 2024 |
| Serbia | 18,352 | 1,989 | 22.56 | 23.80 | 2023 |
| Cambodia | 18,285 | 74,465 | 39.45 | 40.19 | 2024 |
| Belarus | 17,749 | 57.62 | 23.37 | 23.94 | 2024 |
| Luxembourg | 17,190 | 15.88 | 18.44 | 25.99 | 2024 |
| Kenya | 17,134 | 2,396 | 15.86 | 16.14 | 2023 |
| Bahrain | 16,217 | 6.10 | 35.11 | 37.21 | 2023 |
| Costa Rica | 14,057 | 7,241 | 14.74 | 15.90 | 2024 |
| Cote d'Ivoire | 13,765 | 8,586 | 19.41 | 20.06 | 2022 |
| Uruguay | 11,688 | 470 | 14.44 | 15.43 | 2024 |
| Estonia | 10,217 | 9.44 | 23.89 | 24.42 | 2024 |
| Libya | 9,986 | 48.06 | 22.14 | 22.04 | 2023 |
| Uganda | 9,942 | 37,307 | 20.39 | 20.91 | 2023 |
| Zambia | 9,867 | 199 | 35.78 | 37.56 | 2023 |
| Paraguay | 8,388 | 63,418 | 18.87 | 19.52 | 2024 |
| Latvia | 8,283 | 7.65 | 19.03 | 19.36 | 2024 |
| Jordan | 8,189 | 5.81 | 17.69 | 17.78 | 2021 |
| Iceland | 8,044 | 1,110 | 24.04 | 24.09 | 2024 |
| Cameroon | 7,574 | 4,594 | 15.37 | 15.68 | 2023 |
| Brunei | 7,351 | 9.82 | 47.54 | 46.08 | 2024 |
| Senegal | 7,104 | 4,309 | 23.14 | 23.95 | 2023 |
| Botswana | 6,906 | 93.89 | 35.58 | 35.52 | 2023 |
| Mongolia | 6,801 | 23,570 | 33.46 | 37.58 | 2023 |
| Honduras | 6,591 | 163 | 17.77 | 19.28 | 2024 |
| El Salvador | 6,562 | 6.56 | 18.56 | 19.82 | 2024 |
| Ghana | 6,307 | 69.51 | 7.83 | 8.36 | 2023 |
| Georgia | 6,248 | 17.00 | 18.50 | 19.78 | 2024 |
| Bosnia and Herzegovina | 6,113 | 11.05 | 21.57 | 21.64 | 2024 |
| Albania | 5,985 | 557 | 22.02 | 22.19 | 2024 |
| Benin | 5,932 | 3,599 | 30.15 | 30.47 | 2023 |
| Zimbabwe | 5,867 | 8.91 | 16.65 | 16.86 | 2023 |
| Nicaragua | 5,517 | 202 | 28.02 | 29.50 | 2024 |
| Bolivia | 5,426 | 37.49 | 12.02 | 12.37 | 2023 |
| Armenia | 5,332 | 2,094 | 20.68 | 21.46 | 2024 |
| Malta | 5,277 | 4.88 | 21.70 | 25.26 | 2024 |
| Congo | 4,693 | 2,603 | 31.66 | 35.62 | 2021 |
| North Macedonia | 4,377 | 249 | 26.23 | 27.67 | 2024 |
| Tajikistan | 4,328 | 46.93 | 35.34 | 28.33 | 2023 |
| Niger | 4,030 | 2,445 | 24.14 | 24.42 | 2023 |
| Mali | 3,882 | 2,355 | 15.77 | 16.38 | 2023 |
| Cyprus | 3,869 | 3.57 | 10.65 | 11.93 | 2024 |
| Bermuda | 3,692 | 3.69 | 43.04 | 42.16 | 2023 |
| Mauritania | 3,237 | 118 | 30.39 | 30.36 | 2023 |
| Burkina Faso | 3,102 | 1,882 | 15.26 | 15.92 | 2023 |
| Bahamas | 3,042 | 3.04 | 19.92 | 20.73 | 2023 |
| Mauritius | 3,000 | 136 | 21.27 | 19.43 | 2023 |
| Kosovo | 2,765 | 2.56 | 26.41 | 25.88 | 2023 |
| Sudan | 2,579 | 1,435 | 4.99 | 5.10 | 2022 |
| Madagascar | 2,519 | 10,319 | 16.44 | 16.84 | 2022 |
| Tunisia | 2,440 | 7.58 | 5.06 | 5.19 | 2023 |
| Palestine | 2,285 | 2.28 | 16.66 | 13.72 | 2024 |
| Haiti | 2,257 | 318 | 11.37 | 11.37 | 2023 |
| Guinea | 2,199 | 18,716 | 9.81 | 10.74 | 2023 |
| Rwanda | 1,933 | 2,243 | 13.49 | 13.76 | 2023 |
| Mozambique | 1,757 | 112 | 7.84 | 8.83 | 2024 |
| Togo | 1,558 | 897 | 21.05 | 20.93 | 2020 |
| Kyrgyzstan | 1,184 | 99.56 | 9.75 | 9.98 | 2022 |
| Namibia | 1,156 | 21.19 | 8.65 | 8.94 | 2024 |
| Eswatini | 1,042 | 19.23 | 22.63 | 24.26 | 2023 |
| Moldova | 927 | 16.50 | 5.09 | 5.05 | 2024 |
| Montenegro | 916 | 0.85 | 11.35 | 11.38 | 2024 |
| Sierra Leone | 804 | 17.13 | 12.54 | 12.65 | 2023 |
| Maldives | 779 | 11.99 | 11.82 | 13.35 | 2023 |
| Gambia | 731 | 49.03 | 29.17 | 29.55 | 2024 |
| San Marino | 706 | 0.67 | 38.53 | 42.19 | 2022 |
| Belize | 674 | 1.35 | 21.97 | 22.80 | 2023 |
| Aruba | 641 | 1.15 | 17.57 | 19.23 | 2023 |
| Cape Verde | 543 | 55.31 | 19.61 | 19.98 | 2024 |
| Bhutan | 531 | 43.87 | 17.59 | 18.61 | 2023 |
| Lesotho | 421 | 7.77 | 19.89 | 16.35 | 2023 |
| Djibouti | 383 | 68.03 | 9.37 | 9.28 | 2024 |
| Burundi | 291 | 1,003 | 11.06 | 10.98 | 2023 |
| Samoa | 276 | 0.76 | 25.82 | 26.23 | 2024 |
| Solomon Islands | 275 | 2.24 | 17.54 | 17.45 | 2022 |
| Vanuatu | 266 | 30.64 | 25.77 | 22.36 | 2022 |
| Guinea-Bissau | 246 | 149 | 11.82 | 11.75 | 2023 |
| Comoros | 142 | 64.42 | 9.90 | 9.85 | 2023 |
| Tonga | 66 | 0.16 | 13.03 | 11.96 | 2023 |
| Seychelles | 65 | 0.91 | 2.96 | 3.04 | 2023 |
| Kiribati | 56 | 0.08 | 20.77 | 13.61 | 2022 |
| Fiji | 46 | 0.10 | 0.92 | 0.98 | 2022 |
| Marshall Islands | 30 | 0.03 | 11.59 | 10.57 | 2021 |
| Palau | 20 | 0.02 | 7.94 | 7.84 | 2022 |
| Timor-Leste | –35 | –0.03 | –1.67 | –1.42 | 2023 |
| Afghanistan | –546 | –42.02 | –2.74 | –2.72 | 2020 |
| Lebanon | –2,374 | –203,734 | –11.82 | –11.87 | 2023 |

== Gross domestic savings ==
Gross domestic savings (World Bank)
| Country / Territory | Gross domestic savings | | | Year |
| Country / Territory | Millions US$ | Billions LCU | % of GDP | Year |
|---|---|---|---|---|
| China | 7,900,580 | 55,968 | 43.2 | 2023 |
| United States | 5,442,862 | 5,443 | 18.6 | 2024 |
| Germany | 1,160,498 | 1,072 | 24.9 | 2024 |
| India | 1,109,979 | 93,910 | 28.4 | 2024 |
| Japan | 1,042,105 | 146,407 | 24.7 | 2023 |
| Russia | 697,306 | 64,524 | 32.1 | 2024 |
| France | 670,287 | 619 | 21.2 | 2024 |
| United Kingdom | 615,511 | 482 | 16.9 | 2024 |
| Italy | 584,725 | 540 | 24.6 | 2024 |
| South Korea | 551,072 | 719,514 | 32.2 | 2023 |
| Canada | 516,444 | 707 | 23.0 | 2024 |
| Indonesia | 514,800 | 8,162,386 | 36.9 | 2024 |
| Australia | 464,739 | 709 | 26.5 | 2024 |
| Spain | 426,470 | 394 | 24.8 | 2024 |
| Saudi Arabia | 416,488 | 1,562 | 33.7 | 2024 |
| Netherlands | 385,246 | 356 | 31.4 | 2024 |
| Brazil | 379,389 | 2,045 | 17.4 | 2024 |
| Switzerland | 348,500 | 307 | 37.2 | 2024 |
| Mexico | 343,308 | 6,284 | 18.5 | 2024 |
| Turkey | 341,560 | 11,205 | 25.8 | 2024 |
| Ireland | 340,258 | 314 | 58.9 | 2024 |
| Singapore | 317,030 | 424 | 57.9 | 2024 |
| United Arab Emirates | 215,770 | 792 | 42.0 | 2023 |
| Poland | 198,145 | 789 | 21.7 | 2024 |
| Norway | 183,372 | 1,970 | 37.9 | 2024 |
| Sweden | 177,060 | 1,871 | 29.0 | 2024 |
| Iran | 159,885 | 72,406,417 | 36.6 | 2024 |
| Vietnam | 159,835 | 3,802,035 | 36.8 | 2023 |
| Belgium | 159,575 | 147 | 24.0 | 2024 |
| Qatar | 159,402 | 580 | 67.6 | 2022 |
| Israel | 139,976 | 518 | 25.9 | 2024 |
| Denmark | 139,341 | 961 | 32.4 | 2024 |
| Thailand | 132,067 | 4,661 | 25.1 | 2024 |
| Austria | 132,060 | 122 | 25.3 | 2024 |
| Malaysia | 114,757 | 525 | 27.2 | 2024 |
| Czech Republic | 112,496 | 2,612 | 32.6 | 2024 |
| Bangladesh | 107,836 | 11,985 | 24.0 | 2024 |
| Iraq | 107,569 | 139,840 | 38.5 | 2024 |
| Argentina | 106,812 | 97,700 | 16.9 | 2024 |
| Algeria | 102,223 | 13,886 | 41.3 | 2023 |
| Kazakhstan | 97,953 | 44,683 | 37.4 | 2023 |
| Chile | 88,599 | 83,600 | 26.8 | 2024 |
| Kuwait | 85,637 | 26.23 | 46.7 | 2022 |
| Hong Kong | 80,611 | 629 | 19.8 | 2024 |
| Peru | 72,360 | 272 | 25.0 | 2024 |
| Romania | 69,665 | 320 | 18.2 | 2024 |
| Finland | 68,103 | 62.92 | 22.7 | 2024 |
| Portugal | 67,610 | 62.46 | 21.9 | 2024 |
| Hungary | 65,025 | 23,779 | 29.2 | 2024 |
| South Africa | 63,726 | 1,168 | 15.9 | 2024 |
| New Zealand | 52,094 | 84.83 | 20.4 | 2023 |
| Colombia | 50,830 | 207,102 | 12.1 | 2024 |
| Oman | 45,648 | 17.55 | 43.1 | 2023 |
| Luxembourg | 44,670 | 41.27 | 47.9 | 2024 |
| Philippines | 43,143 | 2,472 | 9.3 | 2024 |
| Panama | 34,272 | 34.27 | 41.1 | 2023 |
| Greece | 32,967 | 30.46 | 12.8 | 2024 |
| Morocco | 32,012 | 318 | 20.7 | 2024 |
| Angola | 30,930 | 31,209 | 38.5 | 2024 |
| Tanzania | 29,867 | 77,656 | 37.9 | 2024 |
| Macao | 29,528 | 237 | 58.8 | 2024 |
| Slovakia | 28,746 | 26.56 | 20.3 | 2024 |
| Ecuador | 27,225 | 27.22 | 21.8 | 2024 |
| Dominican Republic | 25,789 | 1,536 | 20.8 | 2024 |
| Bulgaria | 25,449 | 46.01 | 22.7 | 2024 |
| Sri Lanka | 24,082 | 7,276 | 24.3 | 2024 |
| Egypt | 23,922 | 855 | 6.1 | 2024 |
| Pakistan | 23,367 | 6,615 | 6.3 | 2024 |
| Azerbaijan | 22,442 | 38.15 | 30.2 | 2024 |
| Lithuania | 21,720 | 20.07 | 25.6 | 2024 |
| Cote d'Ivoire | 21,639 | 13,121 | 25.0 | 2024 |
| Bahrain | 21,488 | 8.08 | 46.5 | 2023 |
| Uzbekistan | 20,810 | 263,290 | 18.1 | 2024 |
| DR Congo | 20,643 | 58,274 | 29.2 | 2024 |
| Costa Rica | 20,406 | 10,512 | 21.4 | 2024 |
| Slovenia | 20,108 | 18.58 | 27.7 | 2024 |
| Puerto Rico | 19,885 | 19.88 | 15.8 | 2024 |
| Ethiopia | 19,313 | 1,680 | 14.3 | 2022 |
| Croatia | 18,863 | 17.43 | 20.4 | 2024 |
| Belarus | 18,381 | 59.67 | 24.2 | 2024 |
| Serbia | 17,361 | 1,878 | 19.5 | 2024 |
| Uruguay | 16,721 | 672 | 20.7 | 2024 |
| Kenya | 16,187 | 2,182 | 13.0 | 2024 |
| Cambodia | 15,948 | 64,945 | 34.4 | 2024 |
| Libya | 14,254 | 68.88 | 30.6 | 2024 |
| Uganda | 12,750 | 48,177 | 23.8 | 2024 |
| Gabon | 11,307 | 6,856 | 54.2 | 2024 |
| Cuba | 11,303 | 10.11 | 1.2 | 2020 |
| Estonia | 10,969 | 10.13 | 25.7 | 2024 |
| Zambia | 10,916 | 221 | 39.6 | 2023 |
| Ghana | 9,200 | 131 | 11.1 | 2024 |
| Paraguay | 9,073 | 68,594 | 20.4 | 2024 |
| Malta | 8,802 | 8.13 | 36.2 | 2024 |
| Iceland | 8,507 | 1,174 | 25.4 | 2024 |
| Cyprus | 8,184 | 7.56 | 22.5 | 2024 |
| Latvia | 8,091 | 7.47 | 18.6 | 2024 |
| Mongolia | 7,999 | 27,116 | 33.9 | 2024 |
| Cameroon | 7,682 | 4,658 | 15.0 | 2024 |
| Brunei | 7,494 | 10.01 | 48.5 | 2024 |
| Benin | 6,897 | 4,182 | 32.1 | 2024 |
| Chad | 6,179 | 3,747 | 30.0 | 2024 |
| Congo | 6,165 | 3,738 | 39.2 | 2024 |
| Armenia | 5,860 | 2,301 | 22.7 | 2024 |
| Senegal | 5,744 | 3,483 | 17.8 | 2024 |
| Niger | 5,690 | 3,438 | 29.0 | 2024 |
| Bolivia | 5,517 | 38.12 | 12.2 | 2023 |
| Georgia | 5,137 | 13.98 | 15.2 | 2024 |
| Guinea | 4,855 | 41,460 | 19.2 | 2024 |
| Burkina Faso | 4,799 | 2,910 | 20.6 | 2024 |
| Albania | 4,783 | 445 | 17.6 | 2024 |
| Botswana | 4,383 | 59.45 | 22.6 | 2024 |
| Mali | 3,985 | 2,416 | 15.0 | 2024 |
| Bermuda | 3,896 | 3.90 | 43.4 | 2024 |
| Bahamas | 3,608 | 3.61 | 22.8 | 2024 |
| Bosnia and Herzegovina | 3,229 | 5.84 | 11.4 | 2024 |
| Mozambique | 3,122 | 200 | 13.9 | 2024 |
| Mauritania | 2,930 | 107 | 27.5 | 2023 |
| Tunisia | 2,796 | 8.70 | 5.2 | 2024 |
| Nepal | 2,670 | 355 | 6.2 | 2024 |
| Madagascar | 2,593 | 11,735 | 14.9 | 2024 |
| Rwanda | 2,574 | 3,393 | 18.1 | 2024 |
| North Macedonia | 2,553 | 145 | 15.3 | 2024 |
| Mauritius | 2,497 | 116 | 16.7 | 2024 |
| Jordan | 2,455 | 1.74 | 5.3 | 2021 |
| Equatorial Guinea | 2,393 | 1,451 | 18.7 | 2024 |
| Maldives | 2,075 | 31.92 | 31.5 | 2023 |
| Nicaragua | 1,397 | 51.17 | 7.1 | 2024 |
| Sudan | 1,396 | 2,189 | 2.8 | 2024 |
| Guatemala | 1,274 | 9.88 | 1.1 | 2024 |
| Faroe Islands | 1,254 | 8.64 | 32.1 | 2023 |
| Aruba | 1,034 | 1.85 | 28.4 | 2023 |
| San Marino | 868 | 0.82 | 47.4 | 2022 |
| Greenland | 855 | 5.89 | 25.7 | 2023 |
| Togo | 852 | 517 | 8.6 | 2024 |
| Eswatini | 758 | 13.99 | 16.5 | 2023 |
| Belize | 656 | 1.31 | 21.4 | 2023 |
| Bhutan | 612 | 50.57 | 20.3 | 2023 |
| Sierra Leone | 521 | 11.76 | 6.9 | 2024 |
| Montenegro | 473 | 0.44 | 5.9 | 2024 |
| El Salvador | 426 | 0.43 | 1.2 | 2024 |
| Fiji | 410 | 0.92 | 7.5 | 2023 |
| Kosovo | 377 | 0.35 | 3.4 | 2024 |
| Djibouti | 336 | 59.71 | 8.2 | 2024 |
| Gambia | 209 | 14.04 | 8.3 | 2024 |
| Solomon Islands | 142 | 1.16 | 9.1 | 2022 |
| Cape Verde | 127 | 12.92 | 4.6 | 2024 |
| Guinea-Bissau | 111 | 67.11 | 5.2 | 2024 |
| Samoa | 11.32 | 0.03 | 1.1 | 2024 |
| Vanuatu | –10.90 | –1.26 | –1.1 | 2022 |
| Seychelles | –18.71 | –0.27 | –0.9 | 2024 |
| Tajikistan | –29.70 | –0.32 | –0.2 | 2023 |
| Palau | –36.07 | –0.04 | –14.1 | 2022 |
| French Polynesia | –56.49 | –6.23 | –0.9 | 2023 |
| Marshall Islands | –62.66 | –0.06 | –24.2 | 2023 |
| Namibia | –97.26 | –1.78 | –0.7 | 2024 |
| Central African Republic | –119 | –72.14 | –4.3 | 2024 |
| U.S. Virgin Islands | –155 | –0.15 | –3.3 | 2022 |
| Kiribati | –170 | –0.24 | –62.9 | 2022 |
| Burundi | –173 | –598 | –6.6 | 2023 |
| Tonga | –187 | –0.44 | –36.8 | 2023 |
| Comoros | –198 | –90.03 | –12.8 | 2024 |
| Timor-Leste | –478 | –0.48 | –23.0 | 2023 |
| Ukraine | –552 | –22.18 | –0.3 | 2024 |
| Honduras | –564 | –13.98 | –1.5 | 2024 |
| Lesotho | –603 | –11.12 | –28.4 | 2023 |
| Kyrgyzstan | –645 | –56.69 | –4.3 | 2023 |
| Moldova | –857 | –15.24 | –4.7 | 2024 |
| Haiti | –1,389 | –184 | –5.5 | 2024 |
| Zimbabwe | –1,765 | –25.98 | –4.0 | 2024 |
| Palestine | –2,222 | –2.22 | –16.2 | 2024 |
| Afghanistan | –3,308 | –261 | –19.3 | 2023 |
| Somalia | –3,827 | –107,611 | –31.6 | 2024 |
| Syria | –4,139 | –15,524 | –17.5 | 2022 |
| Lebanon | –8,274 | –701,107 | –41.2 | 2023 |
