= International rankings of Georgia =

The following are international rankings of Georgia.

== Demographics ==
Rankings
Name	Rank	Out of	Source	Notes	Year
Population	122	240	CIA World Factbook	Population of 4,935,880 with disputed territories of Abkhazia and South Ossetia. Population of 4 490.500 without disputed territories or approximately 0.062% of the world's population	2014
Population Density	146	242	United Nations	Population density of 64 persons/km^{2}	2013
Birth Rate	155	224	CIA World Factbook	12.93 Births per 1000 population/Year	2014
Death Rate	37	224	CIA World Factbook	10.77 Deaths per 1000 population/Year	2014
Net Migration Rate	182	222	CIA World Factbook	Migrants/1000 population: -3.25 Immigrants per 1000 population/Year	2014
Population Growth Rate	206	233	CIA World Factbook	Population growth rate of -0.11%	2014
Fertility Rate	159	224	CIA World Factbook	Total fertility rate of 1.77 births/woman	2014
Urbanization by country	108	195	United Nations	52.8% of population is urban	2005-10
Urbanization Rate	191	195	United Nations	Urbanization rate is -0.6%	2005-10
Immigrant Population	93	194	United Nations	Immigrants in Georgia: 189,893 or 4.4% of Georgia national population	2013
Life Expectancy	108	World	United Nations	Overall life expectancy of 74.5 years; Male: 70.2 years; Female: 78.8 years	2013
Median Age	44	228	CIA World Factbook	Total median age: 38.8; Male median age:36.3; Female median age: 41.3	2010

== Health ==
Rankings
Name	Rank	Out of	Source	Notes	Year
Suicide Rate	74	109	WHO	Listed from highest suicide rate to lowest; Georgia: Males=7.1/100,000 people, Females=1.7/100,000 people, Total=4.3/100,000 people	2010
Tobacco Consumption per capita	47	185	WHO	1032 Cigarettes smoked per adult per year	2011
Alcohol consumption per capita	67	World	WHO	Per capita alcohol consumption of 7.7 liters per year; Wine: 49.8%; Spirits: 33.2%; Beer: 17%; Others: 0.1%; More info: Alcohol and cancer & Alcoholic liver disease	2010
Physicians per 1000 people	6	World	World Bank	4.8 physicians/1000 people	2010
HIV/AIDS prevalence rate	93	World	CIA World Factbook	HIV/AIDS Prevalence Rate of 0.3% of Population; 200 people die from HIV/AIDS a year	2012
Access to Sanitation	22	129	CIA World Factbook	99% of population have access to proper sanitation	2003
Dietary caloric intake	75	World	FAO	Georgians on average consume 2.810 kcal/person/day; More info: Nutrition	2012
Total health expenditure per capita	69	World	WHO	US $524 spent on health per person	2010
List of countries by total health expenditure (PPP) per capita|Expenditure on health as % of GDP	27	188	WHO	10.8% of GDP is spent on health	2010
Total population suffering from undernourishment	59	103	Countries by undernourishment rate	Listed from highest rate to lowest; Georgia: 13% of population is undernourished	2003
Healthy life expectancy at birth	49	195	WHO	Total Healthy life expectancy (HALE) of 64 years on average at birth; Ranked from highest healthy life expectancy to lowest	2013
Child mortality rate under 5	100	World	World Bank	Total Healthy life expectancy (HALE) of 64 years on average at birth; Ranked from highest healthy life expectancy to lowest	2012

== Society ==
Rankings
Name	Rank	Out of	Source	Notes	Year
Quality-of-life index	96	194	Economist Intelligence Unit	Independent variables include cost of living, culture, economy, safety, environment, freedom, health, infrastructure, climate	2010
Legatum Prosperity Index	84	142	Legatum Institute	Social capital ranked 138 of 142 countries representing extremely low level of trust and volunteering in the Georgian society	2013
Satisfaction with Life Index	169	178	Measure of subjective life satisfaction	Measurement of wealth, health and access to basic education; More info: Sociocultural evolution & Happiness economics	2006
Sustainable Society Index	62	151	SSI rankings for 2012	Sustainable Society Index measures three dimensions of human, environmental and economical well-being; More info: SSI 2012 complete report	2012
Global Gender Gap Report	86	136	World Economic Forum	The four pillars of the GGG report are Economic Participation and Development, Educational attainment, Health and Survival, Political Empowernment. More info: GGG 2013 Report	2013
Mother's Index Rank	98	178	Save the Children: State of the World's Mothers report	The index is a calculated composite measure of indicators for health, education, equality, economic freedom, nutrition & political status related to the well-being of mothers	2014
Child Development Index	43	141	Save the Children: Child Development Index 2012	Index measures education, health & nutrition of children. Georgia is one of the ten top developing countries by CDI moving by 18 places up in the period of 1995-2010	2005-2010
Gender-related Development Index	79	187	United Nations / Complete Report	Index shows the inequalities between men and women in these areas: long and healthy life, knowledge & a decent standard of living	2013
Incarceration Rate	62	222	International Centre for Prison Studies	219 Prisoners per 100,000 People	2014
Homicide Rate	103	World	United Nations	From lowest to highest; Homicide rate of 4.3 intentional murders per 100,000 people. In 2010, 187 homicides committed.	2010
Judicial independence	91	148	World Economic Forum	The extent of judicial independence	2013
Reliabilility of police services	37	148	World Economic Forum		2013
Organized crime	62	148	World Economic Forum	The extent of Organized crime stiffens competititvness	2013

== Education ==
Rankings
Name	Rank	Out of	Source	Notes	Year
Adult literacy rate	13	World	The World Factbook	99.7% of population of age 15 and over can read and write is literate; More info: Functional illiteracy & Aliteracy, Scientific literacy	2011
Pupil-teacher ratio, primary	199	199	World Bank	There is in average 6.2 primary schools students on one teacher. For comparison, Armenia have 19.3 students on one teacher according to the ranking. The similar situation remains in the secondary school pupil-teacher ratio	2012]
Number of Secondary education students	109	195	World Bank	306,930 secondary education students	2002
Education enrollment at tertiary level	78	200	United Nations	155,455 tertiary level students in the country	2002
Education enrollment at tertiary level per capita	42	200	United Nations	33.69 tertiary level students per 1,000 people	2002
Education expenditure as % of GDP	167	173	The World Factbook	2% of GDP is spent on education	2012
Education budget as % of total government budget	181	186	World Bank	Education budget is 7.73% of total government budget	2009
Total school life expectancy	62	110	United Nations	Citizens on average attend 11 years of schooling	2002
Webometrics Ranking of World Universities	149/2204	Central&Eastern Europe/World	Webometrics	Ilia State University is the top university in Georgia as well as the best university in Caucasus region	2014
Quality of Primary Education	94	148	World Economic Forum		2013
Higher education and training	92	148	World Economic Forum	According to the World Competitivness report, the second most problematic factor for doing business in Georgia is inadequately educated workforce	2013
Programme for International Student Assessment Mathematics	65	74	OECD	Other PISA rankings are 69/74 Science and 67/74 Literacy	2009

== Economy ==
Rankings
Name	Rank	Out of	Source	Notes	Year
GDP (PPP)	121	World	World Bank	GDP (PPP)= 27.3 billion dollars	2013
GDP (PPP) per capita	150	World	World Bank	GDP (PPP) per capita= $6.100	2013
GDP (real) growth rate	129	World	CIA World Factbook	Adjusted GDP growth rate of 2.5%; Slowdown from 6.1% in 2012 and 7.2% in 2011. See also: List of countries by GDP growth 1980–2010	2013
Starting a Business Index	8	World	World Bank	The index measures the ease of starting up a new business	2013
Ease of Doing Business Index	8	World	World Bank		2013
Business freedom index	18	World	Freedom Meta-Index	Index measuring freedom for private businesses	2011
Index of Economic Freedom	21	World	The Heritage Foundation		2013
Human Development Index	79	World	United Nations	Human development index of 0.744 which considered High HDI	2013
Income equality	34	World	CIA World Factbook	Georgia had a Gini coefficient of 46	2012
Least Inflation Rates	5	World	CIA World Factbook	Inflation rate of -0.5% making Georgia one of six countries experiencing deflation in 2013	2013
List of countries by received FDI	83	105	CIA World Factbook	10.5 billion dollars of Foreign Direct Investment	2012
current account balance as % of GDP	43	World	CIA World Factbook	Current account balance as % of GDP= -8.62%. Negative is closer to top	2014
Unemployment rate	13	World	United Nations	Unemployment rate of 15%; Ranked from highest unemployment rate to lowest.	2013
GDP sector composition	35	197	CIA World Factbook	Agriculture=11.2%; Industry= 41.7%; Service= 47.1%; Share of oil related activity in total GDP is less than 10%	2005
Public debt as % of GDP	103	World	CIA World Factbook	Total public debt stands at 36.3% of GDP; Ranked from highest total government debt to lowest.	2013
Labour force	122	World	CIA World Factbook	Total labour force of 1.959 million people	2013
Gross savings as % of Gross National Income	85	World	CIA World Factbook	Gross savings of 18% of GDP	2013
International aid received	45	140	World Bank	International aid received is $662 million or ~2.5% of GDP in 2012	2012
Ranking of export complexity	78	World	MIT	This ranking measures complexity of a country economy and exports	2012

== Globalization and Innovation ==
Rankings
Name	Rank	Out of	Source	Notes	Year
Global Competitiveness Report	73	148	World Economic Forum	Report measures global economic competitiveness	2013
Globalization Index	64	207	KOF Globalization Index	25-th economic globalization, 82-nd social globalization, 140-th political globalization	2013
Global Innovation Index	57	139	World Intellectual Property Organization	Index measures enabling environment for innovation; More info: Creativity	2026

== Politics ==
Rankings
Name	Rank	Out of	Source	Notes	Year
Global Peace Index	111	162	Economist Intelligence Unit	More info: GPI map for 2014	2014
Corruption Perceptions Index	55	177	Transparency International	Score:49/100	2013
Irregular payments & bribes	28	148	World Economic Forum	Extent of bribery in business environment	2013
Worldwide press freedom index	84	180	Reporters Without Borders		2013
Democracy Index	102	167	Economist Intelligence Unit	Hybrid Regime	2012
List of countries by Fragile States Index	65	178	Fund For Peace	More info: https://web.archive.org/web/20141118024503/http://ffp.statesindex.org/2014-georgia	2014
Freedom Index	57	166	Freedom Meta-Index		2014
Public trust of politicians	75	148	World Economic Forum	Degree of public trust in ethical standards of their politicians.	2013

== Communication and Information Technology ==
Rankings
Name	Rank	Out of	Source	Notes	Year
Number of Internet Users	91	212	Internet World Stats	2,079,917 Georgians or 45.5% of population use internet	2012
Total number of broadband internet users	76/71	193	International Telecommunication Union	Fixed subscriptions: 416,000 or 9.1%/Mobile subscription: 1,023,000 or 22.4%	2012
ICT Development Index	71	157	United Nations	Aggregated ranking of Information and Communication Technology use, access and development	2012
E-government Development	56	193	United Nations	Measure of a country's e-Government capabilities	2014
E-participation of Public	47	193	United Nations	Measure of a nation's population participation in e-Government	2014
Telephone Lines in Use	67	220	CIA World Factbook	1,276,000 telephone lines in use	2012
Mobile Phones in Use	116	220	CIA World Factbook	4.699 million mobile phones in use	2012
List of countries by number of Internet hosts	59	232	CIA World Factbook	357,864 internet hosts in total	2012
Internet Speed	61	192	Speedtest.net	Average download speed is 14.46 MBPS	2014

== Environment ==
Rankings
Name	Rank	Out of	Source	Notes	Year
Environmental Performance Index	101	178	Yale University	Ability of nations to protect environment	2014
Happy Planet Index	55	110	New Economics Foundation	Happy planet index is a measure of the environmental efficiency of supporting citizens well-being; Georgia index: 46	2012
Water availability per capita	41	176	World Bank	Annual fresh water availability of 12,966 cubic meters per person; Measure of internal renewable water (average annual surface runoff & groundwater recharge generated from endogenous precipitation)	2011
Total renewable water resources	86	173	CIA World Factbook	Georgia has total renewable water resources of 63.33 Cubic Kilometers; More info: Water security & Water resources & Peak water	2012
Land use statistics by country	110	192	CIA World Factbook	Total cultivated land area is 10,664 Square Kilometers, 15.3% of total land area	2012
Carbon dioxide emissions per capita	144	214	United Nations	2.6 tonnes of CO_{2} emissions per person; More info: CO_{2} emissions per person map	2012
Percentage of Forest Cover	61	220	United Nations	40% of total land area, 27,880 Square kilometers of forests	2012
