= International rankings of India =

The following lists show India's international rankings in various fields and topic

== Demography ==
List	India Ranking/Total Countries	Source	Notes
Population	1 / 207	Worldometer	1.398 billion as of December, 2021
Population density	29 / 242	United Nations	2024 report
Fertility rate	102 / 201	World Bank	The total fertility rate in India was 1.98 children per woman in 2021.
Population growth rate (yearly)	107 / 216	World Bank	India population growth rate in the year 2021 was 1.09%.
Area	7 / 194	United Nations Statistics Division(UNSD)	The area of India is 3,287,263 km square.
Net migration (rate)	1 / 194	Micro Trends	The current net migration rate for India in 2020 is -0.369 per 1000 population, a 3.66% decline from 2019.
Net migrants	2 / 194	World Bank	2012 – 2,598,218 emigrated
Health			
Life expectancy	125 / 195	Human development Index	2023– 72.48 years
Infant Mortality	49 / 227	CIA	2024 report
Ethnic and cultural diversity	17/ 215	Fearon Analysis	2003
Epidemiology of diabetes mellitus	2 / 194	International Diabetes Federation	(India has approximately 74.2 millions number of people with diabetes)
Alcohol consumption per capita	98 / 191	World Health Organization	2019
Global Hunger Index	105 / 127	International Food Policy Research Institute	2024 report
Suicide rate	41 / 183	World Health Organization	2024 report
Health Expenditure per capita (PPP)	77 / 190	World Health Organization	2022 –$79 USD
Human Capital Index	116 / 195	World Bank	2020 report
Education
Literacy rate	80.9%	National Sample Survey Office's (NSSO) Periodic Labour Force Survey (PLFS) 2023-24	2023-2024– 80.9%
Programme for International Student Assessment	72 to 74 / 74	OECD	2009
Language
Linguistic diversity index	14 / 232	SIL International	2017
Official languages	2 / 41		22 official languages

== Society ==
List	India Ranking/Total Countries	Source	Notes
World Happiness Report	116/ 147	UN-SDSN	World Happiness Report 2025
Happy Planet Index	30 / 140	New Economics Foundation	2016 – Score 29.2
Aggregate metrics
Human Development Index	130 / 193	United Nations	2023 report – score: 0.685 (medium)
Inequality-adjusted HDI	119 / 193	UNDP	2023- score: 0.475
Legatum Prosperity Index	103 / 167	Legatum	2023- score 53.66
Global Innovation Index	38 / 139	World Intellectual Property Organization	2026
List of countries by homeless population	8 / 52	Business Standard	2011 – 1,770,000 homeless
Urbanization by country	190 / 229	CIA The World Factbook	2023 est
Good Country Index	53 / 149	goodcountry.org	2022 report
Gender
Global Gender Gap Report	108 / 144	World Economic Forum	2018
Gender Inequality Index	76 / 188	UNDP	2017 – value: 0.524 – female Labour force participation rate: 26.8%
State of the World's Mothers report	140 / 179	Save the Children	2015 report
Crime
Intentional homicides	2 / 219	United Nations Office on Drugs and Crime	2015 – 41,623 Intentional homicides
Global Slavery Index	34 / 160	Walk Free Foundation	Global Slavery Index (2023 edition)
Global Terrorism Index	14 / 100	Visionhumanity.org	2024 report
Global Peace Index	115 / 163	Visionhumanity.org	Global peace index 2025

== Economy ==
List	India Ranking/Total Countries	Notes
GDP growth rate	20/132	2023 – 7.8%
Nominal GDP	4/185	2025 – US $4.19 trillion
GDP (PPP)	3/193	2025 – US$17.6 trillion
Per capita GDP (nominal)	136/189	2025 – US$2,878
Per capita GDP (PPP)	119/189	2025 – US$12,132
tax revenue to GDP ratio	109 / 180	2022 – 10.8% of GDP
Imports	11/222	2023 – US $420 billion
Exports	14/222	2023 – US $481 billion
Received FDI	8/115	2023 – US $500 billion
Number of Billionaires	1/71	2023 - 169
Gold reserve	8/18	2025 – 879.6 tons
Public debt	82 / 189	Gdp nominal 2021- 85%
Foreign-Exchange reserves	4/193	2025 - US $702 billion
Minimum wages	64 / 156	2021 – $1350/yr
GNI nominal	5 / 15	2023 – value $3,630,236,700,000
GNI PPP	3 / 15	2023 – value $14,324,038,000,000 international dollars
GNI (PPP) per capita	124 / 179	2021 – $5680international dollars
Employment rate	42 / 47	2020– 56.6% of 15–64 year olds in employment
Globalization Index	107 / 184	2017
World Competitiveness Yearbook scoreboard	45 / 63	2017
Index of Economic Freedom	123 / 178	2016
Quality-of-life index	43 / 56	2017
Ease of doing business index	63 / 190	2019
Global Competitiveness Index	68 / 141	2019
Index of Economic Freedom	128 / 178	2016
Economic Freedom of the World	95 / 157	2015 – score 6.63
Financial Development Index	51 / 183	2016
IT industry competitiveness index	18 / 66	2016
ICT Development Index	134 / 176	2017
Space Competitiveness Index	6 / 15	2013
Networked Readiness Index	91 / 139	2016 – Score 3.8
Passengers carried in rail transport	2 / 86	2016 – 8.224 billion passengers
Longest Railway platforms	1 / 5	
rail transport network size	3 / 149	2015 – 68,525 km
Traffic-related deaths	2 / 180	2013 – 238,562 deaths
Vehicles per capita	84 / 163	2015 – 0.167 per capita, 55,725,543 total
Electricity production	3 / 209	2019 – 1,558,700
Steel production	2 / 38	2018 – 101.4 million metric tons
Coal production	2 / 40	2018 - 716 Mt
Coal consumption	2 / 20	2018 - 982 Mt

== Communications ==
The following rankings involving technological advances in communication are taken from the CIA World Factbook.

List	World rank	Source	Demographics (est.)
Telephone Lines in Use	12 / 218	CIA The World Factbook	2019 Jan – 21.79 million
Mobile Phones in Use	2 / 222		1,515,971,713 lines (90.15% density) for 1.37 billion population, as of October 2020
Internet users (pct of population)	141 / 228	ITU estimate	2017 – 40.142%
Fixed-Broadband Internet subscribers	10 / 228	ITU estimate	2017 - 17,856,024
4G LTE penetration	15 / 75	OpenSignal	2017 – 81.56%
Internet connection speeds	89 / 149	Akamai Technologies	2017 Q1 – Average 6.5Mbit/s
Television broadcast stations	4 / 233		2016 – 857 licensed stations
Wikipedia edits per country	11 / 165	Wikimedia	2013 – 2.9% of edits

== Sport ==
List	India Ranking/Total Countries	Source	Notes
Cricket
Cricket – men's Test	4/12	International Cricket Council	24 May 2025
Cricket – men's ODI	1/20	International Cricket Council	12 June 2025
Cricket – men's T20	1/100	International Cricket Council	30 May 2025
Cricket – women's ODI	3/13	International Cricket Council	June 2025
Cricket – women's T20I	3/64	International Cricket Council	March 2025
Football
Football – men's	127/210	FIFA	June 2025
Football – women's	70/189	FIFA	12 June 2025
Hockey
Hockey – men's	5/96	International Hockey Federation	June 2025
Hockey – women's	9/80	International Hockey Federation	June 2025
Badminton
Badminton	5 / 126	World Badminton Federation(BWF)	4 July 2023
Chess
Chess – Top-Ranked Player	3 / 184	FIDE	1 Jan 2020
Chess – Federation Rank Open	2 / 184	FIDE	1 Jan 2020
Chess – Women's Top-Ranked Player	6 / 156	FIDE	1 Jan 2020
Chess – Federation Rank Women's	2 / 156	FIDE	1 Jan 2020
Tennis
ITF rankings - men's	36/159	International Tennis Federation	18 Mar 2024
ITF rankings -women's	29/142	International Tennis Federation	15 Apr 2024
Volleyball
FIVB Senior World Rankings – men's	46/143	Fédération Internationale de Volleyball	21 August 2026
FIVB Senior World Rankings – women's	72/124	Fédération Internationale de Volleyball	21 August 2026
Basketball
FIBA Men's World Ranking – men's	76/160	FIBA	28 March 2025
FIBA Women's World Ranking – women's	79/160	FIBA	2025
Rugby Union
World Rugby Rankings	89/113	World Rugby	1 July 2024
World Rugby Women's World Rankings	50/65	World Rugby	1 July 2024
Baseball
WBSC World Rankings - men's	68/80	World Baseball Softball Confederation	31 Dec 2023
WBSC World Rankings - women's	15/25	World Baseball Softball Confederation	31 Dec 2023
WBSC World Rankings - baseball5s	43/48	World Baseball Softball Confederation	16 May 2024
Softball
WBSC World Rankings - men's	26/44	World Baseball Softball Confederation	21 May 2024
WBSC World Rankings - women's	54/65	World Baseball Softball Confederation	30 May 2024
Olympics
All-time Olympic Games medal table	60 / 154	IOC	Total=41 medals. Gold=10 Silver=10 Bronze=21
All-time Paralympic Games medal table	56 / 131	IOC	Total=60 medals. Gold=16 Silver=21 Bronze=23

== Entertainment ==
List	India Ranking/Total Countries	Source	Notes
Film productions	1 / 15	UNESCO	2021
Cinema box office	3 / 15	MPAA	2019 - $2.4 bn
Cinema admissions	1 / 10	European Audiovisual Observatory	2019 – 10,324,000,000

== Politics ==
List	India Ranking/Total Countries	Source	Notes
Corruption Perceptions Index	86 / 179	Transparency International	2020
Press Freedom Index	148 / 180	Reporters Without Borders	2020
Soft power	24 / 25	Monocle	2018-19
Monocle Soft power in Asia	7 / 10	Monocle	2016–17
The Asia Soft power 10	3 / 10		2018
Rule of Law Index	68 / 113	World Justice Project	2019
Democracy Index	51/165	Economist Intelligence Unit	2019 (6.90 / 10 flawed democracy )
Democracy Ranking	65 / 112	Democracy Ranking	2015–2016
Corporate Governance	20 / 38	GMI Ratings	2010
E-Government	96 / 192	UN	2018
Global Peace Index	136/163	Institute for Economics and Peace (IEP)	2018

== Military ==
List	India Ranking/Total Countries	Source	Notes
Military expenditure	3 / 186	Stockholm International Peace Research Institute	2021 – $73 bn or 2.24% of GDP
Active troops	2 / 171	International Institute for Strategic Studies	1,450,000
Total troops	2 / 171	International Institute for Strategic Studies	4,941,600 total troops (3.9 troops per 1000 capita)
Composite Index of National Capability	3 / 193	National power	2003 – score 0.073444
Overseas bases	5 / 10		6 overseas bases

== Awards ==
List	India Ranking/Total Countries	Source	Notes
Academy Award nominations – Foreign Language Film	33 / 125	Academy of Motion Picture Arts and Sciences	3 nominations, from 50 submissions
Nobel laureates	19/82	8 Indian Citizens, at the time they were made a Nobel laureate: Mother Teresa (Peace), Amartya Sen (Economics), Kailash Satyarthi (Peace), two British Indian subjects: Rabindranath Tagore (Literature), and C. V. Raman (Physics), along with two Indian-born British subjects: Rudyard Kipling (Literature), Ronald Ross (Medicine), have received the honour. Recently Abhijit binayak banerjee (Economics).	
Turing Award	6/ 13	Association for Computing Machinery	Indian-American Raj Reddy, became the first person of Asian origin to receive the ACM Turing Award, in 1994, for his work in the field of Artificial Intelligence.
World Heritage Sites	1 / 167	World Heritage Committee	40 sites

== Environment ==
List	India Ranking/Total Countries	Source	Notes
Carbon dioxide emissions by country	3 / 214	United Nations Statistics Division	2017
Carbon dioxide emissions per capita	145 / 214	United Nations Statistics Division	2009
Climate Change Performance Index 2025	10/57	Germanwatch; The new climate institute and climate action network	2025
Environmental Performance Index	177 / 180	Yale Center for Environmental Law & Policy	2018
Environment Democracy Index	20 / 70	World Resources Institute	
Air Quality – average PM 2.5 concentration	84 / 92	WHO	2014 – 60.6 μg/m^{3}
Freshwater withdrawal	1 / 170	CIA World Factbook	2008 – 645.84 km^{3}/year
Irrigated land area	2 / 221	CIA World Factbook	2012 – 667,000 km^{2}
Global Climate Risk Index 2021	7th	Germanwatch	2021

== Geography ==
List	India Ranking/Total Countries	Notes
Total area	7/233	3,287,364 km^{2} (1,222,559 sq mile) including land and water
Length of coastline	18/196	7,000 km coastline with 2.00 coast/area ratio (m/km sq). According to the Indian naval hydrographic charts, the mainland coastline consists of the following: 43% sandy beaches; 11% rocky shores, including cliffs; and 46% mudflats or marshy shores.

== Agriculture, fisheries and livestock ==
Field	Rank	Date (Till)
Apple Production, output of 2,589,000 tons	5	2022
Bananas Production, output of 30,808,000 tons	1	2021
Bean Production (dry), output of 6,220,000 tons	1	2021
Buffalo, milk output of 56,960,000 tons	1	2019
Black Pepper, 19% of world output	3	2019
Cauliflowers and Broccoli Production, output of 9,667,000 tons	1	2023
Cardamom Production, output of 15 thousand metric tons	2	2021
Cashew Apple Production, output of 810,000 metric tons	2	2023
Chicken Population, output of 851,810,000	1	2024
Chickpea Production, output of 5,970,000 tons	1	2021
Coconut Production, output of 11,706,343	2	2021
Coffee Production(green), output of 326,982	6	2021
Cotton Production, output of 27.0 million bales	2	2021
Cow Numbers, 307,500,000 cows	1	2023
Fish Production, output of 6,318,887 tons (capture 3,481,136 & aquaculture 2,837,751)	2	2021
Garlic Production, output of 3,208,000 tons	2	2023
Ginger Production, output of 2,170,000 tons	1	2023
Goat Numbers, 148,880,000 goats	1	2008
Goat Milk Production, output of 6,070,000 metric tons	1	2021
Goat Meat Production, output of 550,615 metric tons	2	2022
Jute Production, output of 1,951,864 tons	1	2023
Lemon & Lime Production, output of 3,800,000 tons	1	2023
Lentil Production, output of 1,817,000 tons	1	2021
Mango Production, output of 24,000,000 tons	1	2024
Millet Production, output of 15,380,000 metric tons	1	2023
Milk Production, output of 239,300,000 metric tons (cow milk 50.3 million metric tons)	1	2023
Onion Production(dry), output of 31,700,000 metric tons	1	2023
Orange Production, output of 10,200,000 tons	2	2023
Peanut Production, output of 6.25 metric tons	2	2021
Pineapple Production, output of 1,706,000 tons	5	2023
Potato Production, output of 58,990,000 metric tons	2	2023
Rice Production, output of 137,825,000 metric tons	2	2023
Saffron Production, output of 2,600 kg	2	2021
Sheep Stock, output of 74,260,000	2	2021
Silk Production, output of 77,000,000 kg	2	2021
Sorghum Production, output of 7,900,000 metric tons	1	2021
Soybean Production, output of 13,786,000 tons	5	2018
Sugarcane Production, output of 37,69,00,000 tons	2	2018
Sweet Potato Production, output of 1,400,281 tons	8	2018
Tea Production, output of 1,344,827 tons	2	2018
Tomato Production, output of 21,320,000 tons	2	2023
Wheat Production, output of 113,290,000 metric tons	2	2023

== Cities ==
- The list of cities with most skyscrapers taller than approximately 150 m ranks Mumbai second with 50 buildings behind Dubai.
- The Globalization and World Cities Study Group and Network (GaWC), Loughborough University listed Mumbai, New Delhi, Chennai and Bangalore as emerging world cities.
- List of most polluted cities by particulate matter concentration lists several Indian cities highly.

== Religion ==
List	India Ranking	Source	Notes
Hindu	1st	2011 Census of India	2011 – 966,257,353 (India: 79.8%, World: 95%)
Muslim	3rd	2011 Census of India	2011 – 172,245,185 (India: 14.2%, World: 10.9%)
Christian	26th	2011 Census of India	2011 – 27,819,588 (India: 2.30%, World: 1.16%)
Sikh	1st	2011 Census of India	2011 – 20,833,116 (India: 1.72%, World: 90.02%)
Buddhist	9th	2011 Census of India	2011 – 8,442,972 (India: 0.70%, World: 1.9%)
Jain	1st	2011 Census of India	2011 – 4,451,753 (India: 0.37%, World: 64%)
Zoroastrian	1st	2011 Census of India	2001 – 69,000 (India: 0.006%, World: 50%)
Baháʼí Faith	1st	2011 Census of India	2011 – 1,898,000(India: 0.3%, World: 45%)

- Lists by country
- List of international rankings
