= International rankings of Sri Lanka =

The following are international rankings of Sri Lanka.

== Geography ==
Index	Value	Date	Ranking	Out of	Reference
Area	65,610 km^{2}		120	195	
Coastline	1,340 km		66	198	Central Intelligence Agency

== Demographics ==
Index	Value	Date	Ranking	Out of	Reference
Population	21,919,000	2020	57	195	Department of Census and Statistics
Population density	334.08 (per square kilometer)	2020	24	194	Department of Census and Statistics
Birth rate	16 (per 1,000 population)	2019			World Bank
Mortality rate	7 (per 1,000 population)	2019			World Bank
Fertility rate	2.20 (births per woman)	2019	100	200	World Bank
Life expectancy	76.9 (years at birth)	2019	54	183	World Health Organization
Population growth rate	0.6%	2019			World Bank
Infant mortality rates	6 (per 1,000 live births)	2019	55	193	World Bank
Literacy rate	92.5%	2018	90	171	Central Bank of Sri Lanka
Net migration rate	-4.6 (per 1,000 population)	2015-2020			United Nations, Department of Economic and Social Affairs, Population Division

== Economy ==
Index	Value	Date	Ranking	Out of	Reference
GDP (nominal)	US$84.532 billion	2021	64	192	International Monetary Fund
GDP (nominal) per capita	US$3,830	2021	113	188	International Monetary Fund
GDP (PPP)	US$306.997 billion	2021	56	195	International Monetary Fund
GDP (PPP) per capita	US$13,909	2019	88	188	International Monetary Fund
Real GDP growth rate	4%	2021			International Monetary Fund
Ease of doing business index	Medium	2020	99	190	World Bank
Global Competitiveness Report	57.1	2019	64	141	World Economic Forum
Global Innovation Index		2026	94	139	World Intellectual Property Organization
Income equality	39.3	2016			World Bank

== Mass media ==
Index	Value	Date	Ranking	Out of	Reference
Telephone lines	3,431,111	2024	45	224	Telecommunications Regulatory Commission of Sri Lanka
Mobile numbers	28,884,470	2024	33	76	Telecommunications Regulatory Commission of Sri Lanka
Fixed broadband Internet subscriptions	2,525,650	2024	65	166	Telecommunications Regulatory Commission of Sri Lanka
Mobile broadband Internet subscriptions	20,432,582	2024	46	172	Telecommunications Regulatory Commission of Sri Lanka
e-Government Development Index	0.6667	2024	98	193	United Nations
ICT Development Index	71.3	2024	93	173	International Telecommunication Union

== Politics ==
Index	Value	Date	Ranking	Out of	Reference
Democracy Index	Flawed democracy	2020	68	167	The Economist
Corruption Perceptions Index	38	2023	115	192	Transparency International
Press Freedom Index	42.20	2021	127	180	Reporters Without Borders
Global Peace Index	2.003	2023	107	163	Institute for Economics & Peace
Fragile States Index	81.8	2020	52	178	Fund for Peace
Rule of Law Index	0.52	2020	66	128	World Justice Project
Global Gender Gap Report	0.670	2021	116	156	World Economic Forum
Freedom in the World	Partly free	2021	56	100	Freedom House
