= International rankings of Italy =

The following are international rankings of Italy.

== Culture ==
- Number of Academy Awards for Best International Feature Film 2023: ranked 1st
- World Heritage Sites 2024: ranked 1st

== Demographics ==
- Population 2023: ranked 25th
- Population density 2023: ranked 76th
- Total fertility rate 2023: ranked 190th
- Birth rate 2023: ranked 83rd
- Mortality rate 2023: ranked 20th

== Economy ==
- Nominal Gross Domestic Product 2024: ranked 9th
- Public debt 2024: ranked 18th
- PPP Gross Domestic Product 2024: ranked 13th
- Economic growth rate 2024: ranked 176th
- Net goods exports 2022: ranked 7th
- Exports per capita 2022: ranked 43rd
- Labour force 2017: ranked 24th
- Unemployment 2024: ranked 79th
- Index of Economic Freedom 2019: ranked 80th
- Economic complexity 2018: ranked 14th
- Electricity production 2022: ranked 20th
- Renewable electricity production 2021: ranked 78th

== Education ==
- Spending on education as percentage of GDP 2016: ranked 121st
- Literacy rate 2020: ranked 31st

== Environment ==
- Forest area 2020: ranked 55th
- Air pollution 2020: ranked 84th
- Natural disaster risk 2022: ranked 126th
- Ecological footprint 2021: ranked 48th
- Freshwater withdrawal 2024: ranked 60th
- Carbon dioxide emissions 2024: ranked 19th
- Carbon dioxide emissions per capita 2022: ranked 55th

== Geography ==
- Total area: ranked 71st
- World Resources Institute length of coastline: ranked 28th

== Health ==
- Life expectancy 2023: ranked 10th
- Hospital beds 2017: ranked 30th
- Cancer rate 2022: ranked 22nd
- HIV/AIDS adult prevalence rate 2024: ranked 85th
- Total HIV/AIDS adult infections 2024: ranked 34th

== Infrastructure ==
- Rail transport network size 2023: ranked 16th
- Waterways length 2017: ranked 38th

== Military ==
- Military expenditures 2023: ranked 12th
- Military expenditures per capita 2019: ranked 27th
- Number of military and paramilitary personnel 2021: 29th
- Numeber of aircraft carriers 2024: 8th

== Politics ==
- Economist Intelligence Unit 2019 Democracy Index: ranked 35th out of 167 countries
- Transparency International 2019 Corruption Perceptions Index: ranked 51st out of 177 countries
- Freedom House 2017 Freedom of the Press (report): ranked 62nd out of 197 countries and territories

== Religion ==
- 5th most Christian country in the world by percent of population (47,690,000; 90%)
- 5th most Roman Catholic country in the world by percent of population (55,599,000; 97.20% of all Italian Christians)

== Society ==
- Quality-of-Life Index: ranked 21st
- Average IQ: ranked 1st in Europe and 4th in the world.
- Alcohol consumption 2019: ranked 59th
- Cigarette consumption per capita 2020: ranked 65th
- University of Leicester Satisfaction with Life Index 2017, ranked 50th
- United Nations Development Programme 2019 Human Development Index ranked 29th out of 187
- Homeless population 2021: ranked 48th
- Intentional homicide rate 2022: ranked 182nd
- Incarceration rate 2024: ranked 158th

== Sports ==
- Association football: Italian men's team are 10th in the world in FIFA World Rankings, and 6th in the world in World Football Elo Ratings
- Italian women's team are 14th in the world in FIFA Women's World Rankings
- Basketball: Italy national basketball team are 12th in the world in FIBA World Rankings
- Cricket: Italian cricket team are 30th in the world.
- 6th most successful nation on the All-time Olympic Games medal table (combined summer and winter)
- 6th most successful nation on the All-time Olympic Games medal table (summer games).
- 12th most successful nation on the All-time Olympic Games medal table (winter games).
- Rugby league: Italy national rugby league team are 13th in the world on the RLIF World Rankings
- Rugby Union: Italy national rugby union team are 14th in the world on the IRB World Rankings
- Water Polo: Italy men's national water polo team are 4th in the world on the FINA Water Polo World Rankings
- Water Polo: Italy women's national water polo team are 5th in the world on the FINA Water Polo World Rankings
- Volleyball: Italy men's national volleyball team are 7th in the world on the FIVB World Rankings
- Italy women's national volleyball team are 4th in the world in the FIVB World Rankings

== Technology ==
- Internet connection speeds 2023: ranked 71st
- 4G LTE penetration 2021: ranked 23rd
- Smartphone penetration 2020: ranked 1st
- World Intellectual Property Organization: Global Innovation Index 2026, ranked 27 out of 139 countries

== Tourism ==
- World Tourism rankings 2023: ranked 4th

== See also ==
- Lists of countries
- Lists by country
- List of international rankings
