= List of countries by mobile banking usage =

This is a list of countries by mobile banking usage as measured by the percentage of the population. Mobile banking is generally defined as a service provided a financial institution that allows its customers to conduct financial transactions remotely using a mobile device. This does not include website-based transactions using a web browser, as those would be considered online banking, instead.

== List of countries by mobile banking usage ==
The following list indicates the percentages of banking customers who are reported to have used mobile banking applications at least once. Those who do not use banking services are not included in this percentage.

Country	Mobile banking adoption rate (2020s)
Kenya	88%
Turkey	85%
Nigeria	82%
South Africa	82% (2021)
Norway	>87%
Denmark	>87%
Sweden	>87%
South Korea	76%
Brazil	76%
Australia	75%
Russia	74% (2022)
Canada	70%
Ghana	67% (2021)
United Kingdom	65%
United States	55%
Morocco	42% (2021)
Egypt	38% (2021)

== See also ==
- List of countries by Internet connection speeds
- List of countries by smartphone penetration
- List of countries by number of mobile phones in use
- List of mobile network operators
- List of countries by number of Internet users
