= List of countries by 4G LTE penetration =

This is a list of countries by 4G penetration.

As of the end of 2024, 4G LTE accounted for approximately 54% of global mobile subscriptions, with around 5.0 billion connections worldwide. 4G networks are now available to 93% of the global population. Operators are increasingly re-farming spectrum from older technologies to expand 4G coverage, which has significantly helped bridge the digital divide in many low- and middle-income countries.

== 2021 rankings ==
The following is a list of countries/territories by 4G LTE coverage as measured by SpeedChecker in 2021.

Rank	Country/Territory	Penetration
1	Japan	100.0%
2	South Korea	99.2%
3	United States	97.1%
4	Netherlands	96.6%
5	Denmark	94.8%
6	Switzerland	94.6%
7	Taiwan	94.5%
8	Belgium	94.4%
9	Norway	94.1%
10	Singapore	94.1%
11	Hong Kong	93.8%
12	Lithuania	93.1%
13	Estonia	92.9%
14	Germany	92.5%
15	Finland	92.5%
16	Cyprus	92.1%
17	Qatar	91.9%
18	Czech Republic	91.9%
19	Canada	91.9%
20	United Arab Emirates	91.5%
21	United Kingdom	91.3%
22	Sweden	90.1%
23	Italy	90.1%
24	Hungary	90.0%
25	Puerto Rico	89.8%
26	Bahrain	89.5%
27	France	89.1%
28	Poland	89.1%
29	Slovakia	88.9%
30	Austria	88.8%
31	Australia	88.5%
32	Latvia	88.4%
33	Slovenia	88.0%
34	Kyrgyzstan	87.2%
35	Portugal	87.2%
36	Greece	86.9%
37	Romania	86.6%
38	North Macedonia	86.0%
39	Iceland	86.0%
40	Bulgaria	86.0%
41	Croatia	85.4%
42	Spain	84.6%
43	Serbia	84.3%
44	Georgia	83.4%
45	Thailand	83.3%
46	South Africa	83.1%
47	Luxembourg	82.7%
48	China	82.5%
49	Israel	81.8%
50	Cambodia	81.8%
51	Malaysia	81.7%
52	New Zealand	81.0%
53	Vietnam	80.7%
54	India	80.6%
55	Philippines	80.5%
56	Morocco	79.7%
57	Albania	79.4%
58	Turkey	79.3%
59	Lebanon	79.3%
60	Saudi Arabia	79.2%
61	Russia	79.1%
62	Dominican Republic	78.4%
63	Sri Lanka	77.8%
64	Indonesia	77.6%
65	Ireland	76.9%
66	Oman	76.9%
67	Myanmar	76.9%
68	Guatemala	76.7%
69	Pakistan	75.9%
70	Azerbaijan	75.7%
71	Argentina	74.9%
72	Egypt	74.1%
73	Panama	73.0%
74	Mexico	73.0%
75	Peru	72.5%
76	Kuwait	71.8%
77	El Salvador	71.3%
78	Jordan	71.0%
79	Kazakhstan	71.0%
80	Chile	70.5%
81	Uruguay	70.4%
82	Tunisia	70.4%
83	Uzbekistan	69.8%
84	Costa Rica	69.5%
85	Honduras	69.5%
86	Moldova	68.4%
87	Paraguay	67.9%
88	Brazil	67.5%
89	Jamaica	67.5%
90	Ukraine	67.3%
91	Mongolia	67.1%
92	Bangladesh	66.7%
93	Kenya	65.9%
94	Zambia	64.7%
95	Nicaragua	64.2%
96	Iraq	63.3%
97	Colombia	63.1%
98	Nigeria	62.6%
99	Nepal	61.0%
100	Bolivia	58.4%
101	Algeria	58.4%
102	Ecuador	57.7%
103	Ghana	56.8%
104	Ivory Coast	55.0%
105	Senegal	54.4%
106	Belarus	48.0%

== 2019 Q1 rankings ==
The following is a list of countries/territories by 4G LTE coverage as measured by OpenSignal.com in January, February and March 2019.

Rank	Country/Territory	Penetration
1	South Korea	97.5%
2	Japan	96.3%
3	Norway	95.5%
4	Hong Kong	94.1%
5	United States	93.0%
6	Taiwan	92.8%
7	Netherlands	92.8%
8	Hungary	91.4%
9	Sweden	91.1%
10	India	90.9%
11	Czech Republic	90.6%
12	Belgium	90.4%
13	Australia	90.3%
14	Singapore	90.2%
15	Kuwait	90.0%
16	Switzerland	89.6%
17	Finland	89.5%
18	Canada	88.8%
19	Denmark	88.6%
20	Thailand	88.0%
21	Spain	87.4%
22	United Arab Emirates	87.3%
23	Austria	86.6%
24	Qatar	86.2%
25	United Kingdom	84.7%
26	Slovakia	84.5%
27	Serbia	83.8%
28	Indonesia	83.5%
29	Croatia	83.4%
30	Peru	83.3%
31	Greece	83.2%
32	Myanmar	83.2%
33	Poland	82.9%
34	Portugal	82.6%
35	Oman	82.6%
36	Panama	81.5%
37	Bahrain	81.2%
38	Cambodia	81.1%
39	Kazakhstan	81.0%
40	Mexico	79.8%
41	France	79.7%
42	Malaysia	79.6%
43	Bulgaria	79.5%
44	Paraguay	79.1%
45	Turkey	79.0%
46	Italy	79.0%
47	Argentina	79.0%
48	Saudi Arabia	78.9%
49	Romania	78.8%
50	Bolivia	78.7%
51	Lebanon	78.6%
52	Vietnam	78.4%
53	Senegal	77.2%
54	Germany	76.9%
55	Morocco	76.8%
56	Chile	76.7%
57	New Zealand	76.5%
58	South Africa	75.9%
59	Pakistan	74.9%
60	Kenya	74.2%
61	Russia	73.9%
62	Dominican Republic	73.6%
63	Colombia	73.3%
64	Jordan	73.3%
65	Guatemala	73.1%
66	Azerbaijan	72.9%
67	Philippines	72.4%
68	Albania	72.2%
69	Brazil	72.0%
70	Ivory Coast	71.8%
71	Tunisia	71.8%
72	Israel	69.5%
73	Sri Lanka	68.9%
74	Belarus	68.6%
75	Ukraine	66.4%
76	Costa Rica	65.8%
77	Bangladesh	65.8%
78	Egypt	65.4%
79	Ireland	63.7%
80	Nigeria	63.0%
81	El Salvador	62.8%
82	Ghana	61.2%
83	Iraq	59.7%
84	Nepal	57.6%
85	Ecuador	57.1%
86	Algeria	56.5%
87	Uzbekistan	49.9%

== 2017 Q4 rankings ==
The following is a list of countries/territories by 4G LTE coverage as measured by OpenSignal.com in October, November and December 2017.

Rank	Country/Territory	Penetration
1	South Korea	97.49%
2	Japan	94.70%
3	Norway	92.16%
4	Hong Kong	90.34%
5	United States	90.32%
6	Netherlands	89.64%
7	Hungary	89.26%
8	Kuwait	88.40%
9	Lithuania	88.40%
10	Czech Republic	87.37%
11	Sweden	87.31%
12	Taiwan	87.08%
13	Australia	86.48%
14	India	86.26%
15	Thailand	85.58%
16	Switzerland	85.39%
17	Belgium	85.11%
18	Qatar	84.47%
19	Singapore	84.43%
20	Estonia	84.21%
21	Latvia	84.17%
22	United Arab Emirates	83.78%
23	Spain	83.73%
24	Finland	82.79%
25	Republic of Macedonia	82.62%
26	Canada	82.38%
27	Uruguay	81.59%
28	Denmark	80.50%
29	Croatia	80.44%
30	Luxembourg	79.95%
31	Slovenia	79.22%
32	Bahrain	79.02%
33	Slovakia	78.96%
34	Peru	78.67%
35	Oman	78.41%
36	United Kingdom	77.28%
37	Mexico	76.95%
38	Greece	76.04%
39	Austria	75.60%
40	Portugal	75.57%
41	Serbia	75.19%
42	Malaysia	74.88%
43	Georgia	74.54%
44	Lebanon	74.48%
45	Bulgaria	73.96%
46	Brunei	73.66%
47	Bolivia	73.52%
48	Argentina	73.17%
49	Romania	72.88%
50	Poland	72.84%
51	Saudi Arabia	72.61%
52	Indonesia	72.39%
53	Panama	72.11%
54	Vietnam	71.26%
55	Kazakhstan	71.18%
56	Jordan	70.63%
57	Cambodia	70.51%
58	Paraguay	69.93%
59	Italy	69.66%
60	Morocco	69.34%
61	Ivory Coast	69.30%
62	Iran	69.27%
63	Chile	69.26%
64	Pakistan	69.99%
65	New Zealand	69.07%
66	France	68.31%
67	South Africa	68.30%
68	Turkey	67.95%
69	Albania	67.94%
70	Germany	65.67%
71	Colombia	65.51%
72	Guatemala	65.13%
73	Russia	65.08%
74	Israel	64.66%
75	Philippines	63.73%
76	Myanmar	62.52%
77	Tunisia	61.38%
78	Brazil	61.26%
79	Dominican Republic	60.60%
80	Armenia	59.99%
81	Costa Rica	58.45%
82	Belarus	56.99%
83	Ireland	56.67%
84	Ecuador	46.69%
85	Egypt	45.43%
86	Sri Lanka	45.30%
87	El Salvador	44.70%
88	Algeria	40.94%
89	Bangladesh	40.50%

== 2017 Q1 rankings ==
The following is a list of countries/territories by 4G LTE coverage as measured by OpenSignal.com in 2017 Q1.

Rank	Country/Territory	Penetration
1	South Korea	96%
2	Japan	93%
3	Norway	87%
4	United States	87%
5	Hong Kong	86%
6	Netherlands	86%
7	Lithuania	85%
8	Sweden	84%
9	Hungary	84%
10	Taiwan	83%
11	Finland	83%
12	Kuwait	83%
13	Singapore	82%
14	Estonia	82%
15	India	82%
16	Qatar	81%
17	Canada	81%
18	Czech Republic	80%
19	Australia	79%
20	Latvia	79%
21	Denmark	78%
22	Thailand	76%
23	Bahrain	76%
24	United Arab Emirates	75%
25	Slovenia	75%
26	Switzerland	74%
27	Belgium	74%
28	Austria	73%
29	Spain	72%
30	Croatia	72%
31	Georgia	72%
32	Slovakia	71%
33	Brunei	70%
34	Bulgaria	70%
35	Mexico	69%
36	Portugal	68%
37	Peru	67%
38	Oman	67%
39	Luxembourg	67%
40	Panama	67%
41	Saudi Arabia	66%
42	Greece	66%
43	United Kingdom	66%
44	Lebanon	65%
45	Malaysia	65%
46	Romania	64%
47	Serbia	64%
48	Cambodia	64%
49	Poland	63%
50	Indonesia	63%
51	Israel	63%
52	South Africa	63%
53	Argentina	62%
54	Jordan	62%
55	Kazakhstan	61%
56	Italy	61%
57	Morocco	61%
58	Colombia	59%
59	Russia	59%
60	Germany	59%
61	France	58%
62	Costa Rica	58%
63	New Zealand	58%
64	Turkey	58%
65	Iran	57%
66	Chile	57%
67	Tunisia	56%
68	Guatemala	56%
69	Dominican Republic	56%
70	Brazil	55%
71	Pakistan	53%
72	Philippines	53%
73	Ireland	49%
74	Ecuador	42%
75	Sri Lanka	40%
76	Nepal	40%

== 2016 November rankings ==
The following is a list of countries/territories by 4G LTE coverage as measured by OpenSignal.com in 2016 November.

Rank	Country/Territory	Penetration
1	South Korea	96%
2	Japan	92%
3	Lithuania	85%
4	Hong Kong	84%
5	Netherlands	84%
6	Singapore	83%
7	Norway	82%
8	Kuwait	82%
9	Sweden	81%
10	United States	81%
11	Qatar	81%
12	Hungary	80%
13	Australia	79%
14	Taiwan	78%
15	Finland	76%
16	United Arab Emirates	76%
17	Canada	75%
18	Estonia	75%
19	China	74%
20	Bahrain	74%
21	Slovenia	74%
22	Czech Republic	73%
23	Latvia	73%
24	India	72%
25	Switzerland	71%
26	Denmark	71%
27	Belgium	70%
28	Thailand	70%
29	Spain	67%
30	Peru	67%
31	Austria	66%
32	Portugal	66%
33	Georgia	65%
34	Luxembourg	65%
35	Brunei	64%
36	Mexico	64%
37	Slovakia	64%
38	Saudi Arabia	63%
39	Argentina	63%
40	South Africa	63%
41	Bulgaria	63%
42	Malaysia	63%
43	Croatia	62%
44	Oman	62%
45	Panama	62%
46	Albania	61%
47	Iceland	61%
48	Morocco	60%
49	Colombia	60%
50	Greece	60%
51	Indonesia	59%
52	Jordan	58%
53	Romania	58%
54	United Kingdom	58%
55	New Zealand	58%
56	Chile	58%
57	Israel	58%
58	Germany	57%
59	Poland	57%
60	Guatemala	57%
61	Cambodia	55%
62	Italy	54%
63	Brazil	54%
64	Tunisia	54%
65	Venezuela	53%
66	Costa Rica	53%
67	Turkey	53%
68	Pakistan	53%
69	Dominican Republic	52%
70	Kazakhstan	52%
71	France	49%
72	Russia	49%
73	Iran	48%
74	Philippines	45%
75	Ireland	43%
76	Ecuador	42%
77	Lebanon	41%
78	Sri Lanka	40%

== 2015 Q4 rankings ==
The following is a list of countries/territories by 4G LTE coverage as measured by OpenSignal.com in 2015 Q4.

Rank	Country/Territory	Penetration
1	South Korea	97%
2	Japan	90%
3	Hong Kong	86%
4	Kuwait	85%
5	Netherlands	84%
6	Singapore	83%
7	United States	81%
8	Uruguay	81%
9	Hungary	79%
10	Taiwan	79%
11	Norway	79%
12	Qatar	79%
13	Sweden	79%
14	Estonia	78%
15	United Arab Emirates	76%
16	China	76%
17	Canada	76%
18	Kazakhstan	75%
19	Finland	75%
20	Australia	75%
21	Slovenia	73%
22	Latvia	71%
23	Denmark	70%
24	Switzerland	69%
25	Portugal	67%
26	Peru	66%
27	Austria	66%
28	Belgium	66%
29	Jordan	65%
30	Czech Republic	65%
31	Saudi Arabia	65%
32	Georgia	64%
33	Slovakia	64%
34	Bolivia	61%
35	Mexico	61%
36	Romania	61%
37	Poland	61%
38	Morocco	60%
39	South Africa	60%
40	Spain	59%
41	Colombia	59%
42	Pakistan	58%
43	Greece	57%
44	Puerto Rico	57%
45	Venezuela	57%
46	Guatemala	57%
47	Italy	57%
48	Thailand	56%
49	Germany	56%
50	Malaysia	55%
51	Russia	55%
52	Oman	54%
53	New Zealand	54%
54	Dominican Republic	53%
55	United Kingdom	53%
56	Brazil	53%
57	Iran	52%
58	Israel	52%
59	Argentina	51%
60	France	51%
61	Bulgaria	50%
62	India	49%
63	Chile	47%
64	Ireland	44%
65	Philippines	43%
66	Ecuador	41%
67	Costa Rica	41%
68	Sri Lanka	39%

== 2015 Q3 rankings ==
The following is a list of countries/territories by 4G LTE coverage as measured by OpenSignal.com in 2015 Q3.

Rank	Country/Territory	Penetration
1	South Korea	97%
2	Japan	90%
3	Hong Kong	86%
4	Kuwait	86%
5	Singapore	84%
6	Uruguay	84%
7	Kazakhstan	81%
8	Netherlands	80%
9	Bahrain	79%
10	United States	78%
11	Sweden	78%
12	China	76%
13	Qatar	75%
14	Australia	74%
15	Estonia	74%

== 2013 rankings ==
The following is a list of countries by 4G LTE coverage as measured by Juniper Networks in 2013 and published by Bloomberg.

Rank	Country/Territory	Penetration
1	South Korea	86.0%
2	Japan	21.3%
3	Australia	21.1%
4	United States	19.0%
5	Sweden	14.0%
6	Canada	8.0%
7	United Kingdom	5.0%
8	Germany	3.0%
9	Russia	2.0%
10	Philippines	1.0%
11	Colombia	1.0%

== Global trends ==
While detailed country-level rankings have become less frequent since 2021, the overall global trend continues to show growth. In 2015, 4G networks covered only 47% of the world’s population. By 2023, this had doubled to over 90%. As of 2024, the gap in 4G availability between urban and rural areas in low-income countries remained significant, whereas it had largely closed in developed nations.

The transition to 5G is the primary reason for the shift in data reporting. Many countries have stopped tracking 4G penetration as a standalone metric, instead focusing on next-generation networks. The last comprehensive country-level data sets were published in 2021.

== See also ==
- List of countries by Internet connection speeds
- List of countries by smartphone penetration
- List of countries by number of mobile phones in use
- List of mobile network operators
- List of countries by number of Internet users
- List of countries by 5G penetration
