= List of telecommunications companies =

The list below identifies the largest telecommunications companies by total revenue. For a more thorough list, see the "By region" section.

== By total revenue ==
| Rank | Company | Total revenue (US$ billion) | Country |
|---|---|---|---|
| 1 | China Mobile | $142.72 | China |
| 2 | Verizon | $139.14 | United States |
| 3 | Deutsche Telekom | $136.35 | Germany |
| 4 | AT&T | $125.64 | United States |
| 5 | Comcast (via Xfinity) | $125.27 | United States |
| 6 | Nippon Telegraph and Telephone | $91.24 | Japan |
| 7 | China Telecom | $70.3 | China |
| 8 | Vodafone | $69.83 | United Kingdom |
| 9 | Charter Communications | $54.63 | United States |
| 10 | América Móvil | $52.05 | Mexico |
| 11 | China Unicom | $50.74 | China |
| 12 | Orange | $46.51 | France |
| 13 | SoftBank | $46.13 | Japan |
| 14 | Telefónica | $40.4 | Spain |
| 15 | KDDI | $38.90 | Japan |
| 16 | BT Group | $32.0 | United Kingdom |
| 17 | Bharti Airtel | $22.6 | India |
| 18 | China Communications Services | $20.9 | China |
| 19 | Saudi Telecom Company | $20.9 | Saudi Arabia |
| 20 | KT Corporation | $20.0 | South Korea |
| 21 | BCE | $17.9 | Canada |
| 22 | Swisscom | $16.9 | Switzerland |
| 23 | Rogers Communications | $16.1 | Canada |
| 24 | Telstra | $14.9 | Australia |
| 25 | Telus | $14.6 | Canada |
| 26 | Gruppo TIM | $14.2 | Italy |
| 27 | MTN Group | $13.6 | South Africa |
| 28 | Cox Communications | $12.6 | United States |
| 29 | Lumen | $12.11 | United States |
| 30 | Singtel | $12.0 | Singapore |
| 31 | SK Telecom | $12.0 | South Korea |
| 32 | Reliance Jio | $11.3 | India |
| 33 | LG Uplus | $10.9 | South Korea |
| 34 | SFR | $10.6 | France |
| 35 | Viettel | $9.0 | Vietnam |
| 36 | Telkom Indonesia | $8.9 | Indonesia |
| 37 | Telia Company | $8.6 | Sweden |
| 38 | Vodacom | $8.3 | South Africa |
| 39 | Telenor | $7.6 | Norway |
| 40 | Türk Telekom | $7.6 | Turkey |
| 41 | Chunghwa Telecom | $7.5 | Taiwan |
| 42 | Zain | $7.25 | Kuwait |
| 43 | Proximus | $7.19 | Belgium |
| 44 | United Internet | $7.0 | Germany |
| 45 | Advanced Info Service | $6.9 | Thailand |
| 46 | Ooredoo | $6.74 | Qatar |
| 47 | Taiwan Mobile | $6.41 | Taiwan |
| 48 | Frontier Communications | $6.3 | United States |
| 49 | A1 Telekom Austria Group | $6.2 | Austria |
| 50 | Telecom Argentina | $6.2 | Argentina |
| 51 | Telephone and Data Systems | $6.0 | United States |
| 52 | KPN | $6.0 | Netherlands |
| 53 | StarHub | $5.9 | Singapore |
| 54 | Millicom | $5.8 | Luxembourg |
| 55 | Mobile TeleSystems | $5.6 | Russia |
| 56 | Digi Communications | $5.51 | Romania |
| 67 | Turkcell | $5.5 | Turkey |
| 58 | Optus | $5.3 | Australia |
| 59 | e& | $5.2 | United Arab Emirates |
| 60 | Mediacom | $5.0 | United States |
| 61 | VEON | $4.3 | Netherlands |
| 62 | Du (company) | $4.3 | United Arab Emirates |
| 63 | Crown Castle International | $4.2 | United States |
| 64 | OTE | $4.1 | Greece |
| 65 | Windstream Holdings | $4.0 | United States |
| 66 | PLDT | $3.8 | Philippines |
| 67 | Virgin Media O2 | $3.4 | United Kingdom |
| 68 | Globe Telecom | $3.1 | Philippines |
| 69 | Consolidated Communications | $3.1 | United States |
| 70 | Oi | $2.9 | Brazil |
| 71 | Maxis Communications | $2.73 | Malaysia |
| 72 | Tata Communications | $2.7 | India |
| 73 | Vivendi | $2.7 | France |
| 74 | Telkom (South Africa) | $2.7 | South Africa |
| 75 | Zayo Group | $2.6 | United States |
| 76 | Iliad SA | $2.6 | France |
| 77 | Vocus Group | $2.4 | Australia |
| 78 | MegaFon | $2.3 | Russia |
| 79 | Granite Telecommunications | $1.9 | United States |
| 80 | Algar Telecom | $1.8 | Brazil |
| 81 | Cell C | $1.8 | South Africa |
| 82 | GTT Communications | $1.7 | United States |
| 83 | Vonage | $1.67 | United States |
| 84 | Bouygues Telecom | $1.6 | France |
| 85 | Eir | $1.3 | (Republic of Ireland) Ireland |
| 86 | Vi | $1.2 | India |
| 87 | Altafiber | $1.2 | United States |
| 88 | IDT Corporation | $1.2 | United States |
| 89 | Cable One | $1.2 | United States |

Note: Numbers of total revenues of most telephone operating companies are sourced from Forbes or MarketScreener. When US$ revenues unavailable from reliable sites, currency conversions for 2026 revenues are based on the closing currency exchange rate on the last day of 2026 (June 20).

== By region ==
- List of telecommunications companies in the Americas
- List of telecommunications companies in Asia and Oceania
- List of telecommunications companies in Europe
- List of telecommunications companies in the Middle East and Africa

== See also ==
- Telecommunications company
- ITU-T
- Landline
- List of mobile network operators
  - List of mobile network operators of the Americas
  - List of mobile network operators in Asia and Oceania
  - List of mobile network operators in Europe
  - List of mobile network operators in the Middle East and Africa
  - List of mobile network operators in Canada
  - List of mobile network operators of the Caribbean
- Mobile network operator
- Mobile phone
- Mobile virtual network operator
- List of sovereign states by number of broadband Internet subscriptions
- List of countries by number of Internet users
- List of countries by number of telephone lines in use
- List of countries by smartphone penetration
- List of multiple-system operators
