= List of multiple-system operators =

A multiple-system operator (MSO) is an operator of multiple cable or direct-broadcast satellite television systems. A cable system in the United States, by Federal Communications Commission (FCC) definition, is a facility serving a single community or a distinct governmental entity, each of which has its own franchise agreement with the cable company. Though in the strictest sense any cable company that serves multiple communities is an MSO, the term today is usually reserved for companies that own multiple cable systems, such as Rogers Communications, Shaw Communications, and Videotron in Canada; Optimum Communications, Charter Communications, Comcast and Cox Communications in the United States; or Virgin Media in the UK.

== Top multichannel video service providers in the United States by number of subscribers ==
Rank	Company	Brand	Total subscribers	Technology	Date/source
1	Charter Communications	Spectrum	13,800,000	Cable	Q3 2026
2	Alphabet Inc. (Google)	YouTube TV	11,000,000+	IPTV	Q1 2026
3	Comcast	Xfinity	10,394,000	Cable	Q3 2026
4	TPG Inc.	DirecTV	8,200,000	Satellite/IPTV	Q1 2026
5	Disney	Hulu + Live TV; FuboTV	6,200,000	IPTV	Q1 2026
6	EchoStar	Dish Network	4,680,000	Satellite	Q2 2026
7	Verizon	Fios	2,441,000	Fiber	Q4 2025
8	EchoStar	Sling TV	1,710,000	IPTV	Q2 2026
9	Optimum Communications	Optimum	1,530,000	Cable	Q2 2026
10	Skydance; AMC; Hearst	Philo	1,300,000	IPTV	Q1 2025
11	Roku, Inc.	Frndly TV	700,000	IPTV	Q4 2022
12	Mediacom	Xtream	510,000	Cable	Q1 2023
13	Cogeco	Breezeline	220,354	Cable	Q1 2026
14	Cincinnati Bell	Altafiber	141,300	Fiber	Q4 2025
15	Telephone and Data Systems	TDS Telecom	114,000	Fiber	Q2 2026
16	Cable One	Sparklight	77,600	Cable	Q4 2025

== Top multichannel video service providers outside of US, by number of subscribers ==
GTPL Hathway Limited has highest Cable subscriber in India - Aactivebase- 10000000+ Subs and third Largest in World.
Country	MSO name	# of subscribers
India	DEN Network	23,000,000
India	NXTDIGITAL INDigital	22,500,000
India	Hathway Cable	22,500,000
France	Altice France (SFR)	21,900,000
China	Shandong Cable Network	18,000,000
China	Guangdong Cable Network	13,000,000
India	Siti Cable	30,525,000
Mainland Europe (7 countries)	UPC Broadband	9,100,000
China	Beijing Gehua	5,840,000
Germany	Vodafone Deutschland	8,900,000
South Korea	KT Genie TV	8,783,984
China	Shanghai Oriental Cable Net	6,700,000
South Korea	SK Broadband	6,419,536
Brazil	Claro TV+	5,381,000
South Korea	LG U+	5,362,089
United Kingdom & (Republic of Ireland) Ireland	Virgin Media	4,772,800
Canada	Rogers Cable	4,643,000
South Korea	LG HelloVision	3,699,046
Japan	J:Com	3,300,000
Netherlands	Ziggo	3,017,000
India	THAMIZHAGA CABLE TV COMMUNICATION	3,000,000
South Korea	KT SkyLife	2,953,347
South Korea	SK Broadband Cable	2,831,064
India	Asianet Broadband	2,500,000
Belgium	Telenet	2,300,000
Germany	Kabel BW	2,300,000
South Korea	D'LIVE	2,004,728
Spain	Vodafone Spain	1,823,536
Sweden	Com Hem	1,760,000
Switzerland	Cablecom	1,670,000
Canada	Videotron	1,652,200
India	Kerala Vision	1,500,000
Portugal	NOS	1,467,000
South Korea	CMB	1,425,850
United Kingdom	BT	1,400,000
Portugal	Altice Portugal (MEO)	1,387,000
South Korea	skyHCN	1,277,671
Denmark	YouSee A/S	1,200,000
Taiwan	Kbro	1,150,000
Taiwan	CNS	1,100,000
Canada	Shaw Direct	886,106
Canada	Cogeco	859,090
Australia	Austar	742,000
Poland	Vectra S.A.	740,000
Taiwan	TBC	700,000
Taiwan	TFN media	550,000
India	APSFL	500,000
Canada	Eastlink	457,075
Spain	Euskaltel	400,000

== See also ==
- Multichannel television in the United States
- List of broadband providers in the United States
- List of sovereign states by number of broadband Internet subscriptions
- List of countries by number of Internet users
- List of countries by number of telephone lines in use
- List of countries by smartphone penetration
- List of mobile network operators
- List of cable television companies
- List of telecommunications companies
- Triple play (telecommunications)
