= List of countries by labour force =

This is a list of countries by size of the labour force mostly based on The World Factbook in 2024.

Country/Region	Labour force
World	3,684,278,700
China	773,880,000
India	607,691,000
European Union	221,389,600
United States	174,174,000
Indonesia	143,144,000
Nigeria	113,350,000
Brazil	106,790,000
Pakistan	83,644,000
Bangladesh	77,355,000
Russia	72,517,000
Japan	69,382,000
Mexico	60,959,000
Vietnam	57,133,000
Ethiopia	54,470,000
Philippines	50,979,000
Germany	43,772,000
Thailand	40,623,000
DR Congo	38,546,000
Turkey	36,081,000
United Kingdom	35,359,000
Egypt	33,749,000
Tanzania	32,983,000
France	31,725,000
South Korea	29,713,000
Iran	28,575,000
South Africa	27,766,000
Colombia	26,822,000
Italy	25,828,000
Spain	24,386,000
Kenya	23,781,000
Canada	22,868,000
Uganda	22,829,000
Myanmar	22,742,000
Argentina	22,286,000
Peru	18,918,000
Malaysia	18,264,000
Poland	18,245,000
North Korea	17,637,000
Saudi Arabia	17,168,000
Madagascar	16,519,000
Angola	15,961,000
Mozambique	15,173,000
Australia	14,912,000
Uzbekistan	13,974,000
Ghana	13,928,000
Algeria	13,294,000
Cote d'Ivoire	12,595,000
Morocco	12,475,000
Iraq	12,008,000
Venezuela	11,136,000
Cameroon	11,119,000
Niger	10,486,000
Netherlands	10,315,000
Kazakhstan	10,285,000
Chile	10,088,000
Cambodia	9,904,000
Afghanistan	9,133,000
Mali	9,126,000
Ecuador	8,821,000
Malawi	8,602,000
Sri Lanka	8,499,000
Nepal	8,435,000
Romania	8,263,000
Yemen	7,848,000
Guatemala	7,575,000
Zambia	7,407,000
United Arab Emirates	7,090,000
Bolivia	6,859,000
Syria	6,617,000
Chad	6,600,000
Burkina Faso	6,461,000
Benin	6,397,000
Zimbabwe	6,386,000
Burundi	6,107,000
Senegal	5,763,000
Sweden	5,699,000
Rwanda	5,671,000
Czech Republic	5,541,000
Portugal	5,464,000
Belgium	5,416,000
Dominican Republic	5,413,000
Haiti	5,281,000
Switzerland	5,153,000
Azerbaijan	5,020,000
Hungary	4,954,000
Cuba	4,859,000
Belarus	4,817,000
Austria	4,768,000
Israel	4,710,000
Greece	4,655,000
Guinea	4,534,000
Honduras	4,296,000
Tunisia	4,247,000
Hong Kong	3,836,000
Singapore	3,722,000
Papua New Guinea	3,660,000
Laos	3,585,000
Paraguay	3,502,000
Somalia	3,439,000
Togo	3,345,000
Serbia	3,230,000
Nicaragua	3,225,000
Denmark	3,210,000
Kyrgyzstan	3,197,000
Bulgaria	3,124,000
New Zealand	3,124,000
Jordan	3,080,000
Norway	3,042,000
Kuwait	3,003,000
Finland	2,898,000
El Salvador	2,890,000
Sierra Leone	2,863,000
Ireland	2,857,000
Tajikistan	2,780,000
Slovakia	2,779,000
Oman	2,696,000
Liberia	2,607,000
Libya	2,585,000
Congo	2,563,000
Turkmenistan	2,445,000
Costa Rica	2,357,000
Panama	2,206,000
Qatar	2,123,000
Central African Republic	2,000,000
Georgia	1,833,000
Uruguay	1,768,000
Croatia	1,733,000
Eritrea	1,710,000
Jamaica	1,570,000
Lithuania	1,548,000
Armenia	1,510,000
Mongolia	1,449,000
Albania	1,370,000
Moldova	1,358,000
Bosnia and Herzegovina	1,356,000
Mauritania	1,210,000
Botswana	1,173,000
Puerto Rico	1,152,000
Namibia	1,131,000
Slovenia	1,058,000
Latvia	954,900
Bahrain	913,300
Lesotho	884,200
Guinea-Bissau	845,300
Gabon	824,400
Gambia	783,100
North Macedonia	779,200
Cyprus	772,300
Estonia	756,200
Equatorial Guinea	715,000
Trinidad and Tobago	649,900
Timor-Leste	615,900
Mauritius	594,900
Solomon Islands	435,600
Bhutan	406,500
Eswatini	390,600
Fiji	387,800
Macau	382,100
Luxembourg	350,000
Malta	318,200
Guyana	292,200
Comoros	276,400
Maldives	270,300
Djibouti	265,200
Suriname	255,500
Iceland	248,400
Montenegro	245,300
Bahamas	237,100
Brunei	233,500
Cape Verde	224,500
Belize	190,000
Barbados	147,200
New Caledonia	130,800
French Polynesia	119,100
Vanuatu	118,100
Saint Lucia	102,400
Guernsey	82,400
Jersey	82,400
Guam	77,700
Samoa	57,200
Saint Vincent and the Grenadines	52,100
U.S. Virgin Islands	47,200
Tonga	34,800
Sao Tome and Principe	34,500
