= List of countries by number of mobile numbers in use =

This list ranks the countries of the world by the number of mobile phone numbers in use. As an important caveat, this list does not provide the number of mobile phones in use. It is common for each SIM card has a separate phone number, so phones with multiple SIM cards will have multiple phone numbers. As another caveat, some mobile phone numbers may be used by machines as a modem, such as intrusion detection systems, home automation, or leak detection, and some numbers may be used as a local micro-cell.

Rankings	Country or regions	# of phone numbers	Population	Phone #'s/100 citizens	Date of evaluation
World		7,950,000,000+	7,621,018,958	104.32	2019/12
1	China	1,610,360,000	1,420,050,000	113.38	2020/10
2	India	1,515,971,713	1,375,245,994	110.18	2020/10
3	Indonesia	385,573,398	237,556,363	162.28	2016/07
4	United States	380,577,528	327,874,628	116.27	2020/10
5	Brazil	284,200,000	201,032,714	141.3	2015/05
6	Russia	256,116,000	142,905,200	155.5	2013/07
7	Pakistan	196,017,287	241,422,083	80.1	2024/12
8	Nigeria	190,475,494	190,551,754	99.5	2020/04
9	Bangladesh	180,780,000	162,951,560	111.11	2022/03
10	Japan	146,649,600	127,300,000	115.2	2013
11	Germany	107,000,000	81,882,342	130.1	2013
12	Philippines	106,987,098	94,013,200	113.8	2013/10
13	Mexico	101,339,000	112,322,757	90.2	2013/07
14	Iran	96,165,000	86,330,703	130	2013/02
15	Egypt	95,340,000	99,958,000	95.38	2019/12
16	Turkey	92,200,000	85,372,377	108.2	2024
17	Italy	88,580,000	60,790,400	147.4	2013/12
18	Ethiopia	87,300,000	126,500,000	69	2023/24
19	United Kingdom	83,100,000	64,100,000	129.6	2013
20	Vietnam	72,300,000	90,549,390	79	2013/10
21	France	72,180,000	63,573,842	114.2	2013/12
22	Thailand	69,000,000	67,480,000	105	2015
23	South Africa	59,474,500	50,586,757	117.6	2013
24	Colombia	57,900,472	49,375,617	118.9	2017
25	Ukraine	57,505,555	45,579,904	126.0	2013/12
26	Argentina	56,725,200	40,134,425	141.34	2013
27	Tanzania	56,313,438	62,715,877	86.5	2020/03
28	South Korea	56,004,887	50,219,669	111.5	2014
29	Spain	55,740,000	47,265,321	118.0	2013/12
30	Poland	47,153,200	38,186,860	123.48	2013
31	Saudi Arabia	46,000,000	27,137,000	169.5	2013/12
32	Morocco	44,450,000	33,818,662	131	2015
33	Sri Lanka	38,849,812	21,671,000	179.3	2018/12
34	Peru	34,235,000	31,179,417	109.8	2015
35	Nepal	34,172,058	26,620,020	134.41	2018: NTA_MIS_128,2018
36	Algeria	33,000,000	35,000,000	94.2	2013
37	Venezuela	32,019,086	30,163,157	106.15	2014
38	Canada	31,210,628	36,885,049	84.6	2018
39	Taiwan	28,610,000	23,197,947	123.33	2013/12
40	Malaysia	30,379,000	28,250,000	143.8	2014/04
41	Kenya	28,080,000	42,000,000	71.3	2013
42	Romania	26,000,000	21,438,000	123.45	2010/12/16
43	Chile	21,000,000	17,094,270	122.9	2013/12
44	Australia	20,570,000	23,490,700	87.6	2014/11
45	Netherlands	20,000,000	16,515,057	121.1	2013/11
46	Hong Kong	19,207,578	7,482,500	256.7	2018/09
47	Guatemala	17,571,895	14,713,763	119.4	2013/06
48	United Arab Emirates	17,132,724	8,410,763	203.7	2014/11
49	Ecuador	15,900,000	14,300,000	111.18	2013/01
50	Sweden	14,500,000	9,906,331	146.4	2016/06
51	Zimbabwe	13,518,887	13,060,000	103.5	2014/01
52	Portugal	13,400,000	10,562,178	126.87	2013/11
53	Belgium	11,822,000	10,414,000	113.6	2013
54	Hungary	11,561,890	9,908,798	116.7	2013/11
55	Bulgaria	10,454,400	7,200,000	145.2	2013
56	Israel	9,701,200	7,900,000	122.8	2013
57	Finland	9,040,000	5,652,881	159.9	2025 H2
58	Costa Rica	8,300,000	4,872,000	156	2017/06
59	Singapore	8,106,700	5,399,000	150.1	2015/01
60	Azerbaijan	7,000,000	5,543,819	126.2	2008/02
61	Denmark	7,000,000	5,700,000	127.5	2013
62	Panama	6,900,000	3,405,813	202.5	2013/07
63	Jordan	6,010,000	5,950,000	101.0	2010/03
64	(Republic of Ireland) Ireland	5,770,638	4,581,269	125.9	2015
65	Lithuania	4,940,000	2,955,986	167.1	2013 Q2
66	New Zealand	4,761,000	4,500,000	111.1	2013
67	Mongolia	3,500,000	2,980,000	117.4	2013
68	Lebanon	2,720,000	4,224,000	64.4	2010/10
69	Latvia	2,579,000	1,986,705	129.8	2015/07
70	North Korea	3,000,000	24,451,285	12.3	2015
71	Trinidad and Tobago	2,060,000	1,363,985	151.6	2019 Q2
72	Estonia	1,904,000	1,269,420	150.5	2015/07
73	Cuba	1,300,000	11,200,000	11.6	2011/12
74	Montenegro	1,117,500	620,029	180.23	2015/09
75	Malta	554,651	452,515	122.57	2013/06
76	Maldives	776,716	417,492	245.92	2017/07

== See also ==
- List of countries by smartphone penetration
- List of countries by number of telephone lines in use
- List of mobile network operators
- List of countries by number of Internet users
