= List of sovereign states by number of broadband internet subscriptions =

Worldwide broadband subscriptions
Users	2007	2010	2016	2019
World population	6.6 billion	6.9 billion	7.3 billion	7.75 billion
Fixed broadband	5%	8%	11.9%	14.5%
Developing world	2%	4%	8.2%	11.2%
Developed world	18%	24%	30.1%	33.6%
Mobile broadband	4%	11%	49.4%	83%
Developing world	1%	4%	40.9%	75.2%
Developed world	19%	43%	90.3%	121.7%

Broadband subscriptions by region
Subscription	Place	2007	2010	2014	2019
Fixed	Africa	0.1%	0.2%	0.4%	0.4%
Fixed	Americas	11%	14%	17%	22%
Fixed	Arab States	1%	2%	3%	8.1%
Fixed	Asia and Pacific	3%	6%	8%	14.4%
Fixed	Commonwealth of Independent States	2%	8%	14%	19.8%
Fixed	Europe	18%	24%	28%	31.9%
Mobile	Africa	0.2%	2%	19%	34%
Mobile	Americas	6%	23%	59%	104.4%
Mobile	Arab States	0.8%	5%	25%	67.3%
Mobile	Asia and Pacific	3%	7%	23%	89%
Mobile	Commonwealth of Independent States	0.2%	22%	49%	85.4%
Mobile	Europe	15%	29%	64%	97.4%

This article contains a sortable list of countries by number of broadband internet subscriptions and penetration rates, using data compiled by the International Telecommunication Union.

== List ==
The list includes figures for both fixed wired broadband subscriptions and mobile cellular subscriptions:

- Fixed-broadband access refers to high-speed fixed (wired) access to the public internet at downstream speeds equal to, or greater than, 256 kbit/s. This includes satellite internet access, cable modem, DSL, fibre-to-the-home/building, and other fixed (wired) broadband subscriptions. The totals are measured irrespective of the method of payment.
- Mobile-cellular access refers to high-speed mobile access to the public internet at advertised data speeds equal to, or greater than, 256 kbit/s. To be counted, a mobile subscription must allow access to the greater internet via HTTP and must have been used to make a data connection using the Internet Protocol in the previous three months. SMS and MMS messaging do not count as an active internet data connection even if they are delivered via IP.

Penetration rate is the percentage (%) of a country's population that are subscribers. A dash (—) is shown when data for 2012 is not available. Non-country and disputed areas are shown in italics. Taiwan is listed as a sovereign country.

Note: Because a single internet subscription may be shared by many people and a single person may have more than one subscription, the penetration rate will not reflect the actual level of access to broadband internet of the population and penetration rates larger than 100% are possible.

Country or area	Fixed-broadband subscriptions				Mobile-cellular subscriptions			
Country or area	Number	Rank	Subscriptions per 100 individuals	Rank	Number	Rank	Subscriptions per 100 individuals	Rank
China	378,540,000	1	26.86	43	1,474,097,000	1	104.58	105
United States	109,838,000	2	33.85	24	395,881,000	4	122.01	65
Japan	40,390,640	3	31.68	28	170,128,499	7	133.45	36
Germany	33,217,000	5	40.45	10	106,000,000	15	129.09	45
Russian Federation	30,872,788	6	21.44	54	227,341,873	6	157.89	12
Brazil	28,670,016	7	13.70	74	236,488,548	5	113.00	90
France	28,429,000	8	43.75	5	69,017,000	22	106.21	99
India	39,460,000	4	1.33	126	1,160,710,910	2	80.50	142
United Kingdom	26,015,818	9	39.31	13	79,173,658	20	119.63	74
South Korea	21,195,918	10	41.58	9	63,658,688	23	124.86	55
Mexico	17,131,820	11	13.26	75	114,326,842	14	88.51	126
Italy	16,586,376	12	27.94	39	83,871,543	19	141.29	26
Spain	14,473,888	13	31.22	30	52,484,655	28	113.22	89
Canada	13,922,504	14	38.01	15	31,458,600	43	85.90	131
Turkey	11,924,905	15	14.77	70	77,800,170	21	96.35	116
Vietnam	11,269,936	16	11.80	81	120,016,181	12	125.62	53
Iran	10,057,769	17	12.39	79	87,106,508	18	107.32	96
Thailand	8,208,000	18	11.89	80	121,530,000	11	176.03	6
Australia	7,923,000	19	32.40	27	27,553,000	47	112.69	91
Argentina	7,870,222	20	17.78	64	61,897,379	26	139.81	28
Bangladesh	7,296,000	21	4.43	106	145,113,669	8	88.12	127
Netherlands	7,210,800	22	42.33	7	20,532,000	55	120.52	72
Poland	7,053,333	23	18.48	61	49,828,596	30	130.54	43
Colombia	6,318,936	24	12.88	76	62,222,011	25	126.81	49
Indonesia	6,044,712	25	2.29	121	458,923,202	3	173.84	7
Taiwan	5,713,568	26	24.18	49	28,777,408	44	121.80	67
Ukraine	5,239,743	27	12.55	78	55,714,733	27	133.49	35
Egypt	5,223,311	28	5.35	105	102,958,194	16	105.54	102
Romania	4,780,000	29	24.29	48	22,550,000	54	114.59	85
Belgium	4,378,973	30	38.31	14	11,961,089	74	104.65	104
Switzerland	3,850,000	31	45.42	3	11,292,000	78	133.22	37
Greece	3,778,263	32	33.86	23	12,937,106	70	115.93	84
Sweden	3,735,884	33	37.70	16	12,435,709	72	125.48	54
Portugal	3,574,047	34	34.60	22	11,764,106	76	113.89	87
Philippines	3,399,291	35	3.24	113	173,200,000	13	159.40	93
Uzbekistan	3,320,210	36	10.40	84	24,265,460	51	76.04	148
Algeria	3,166,907	37	7.66	95	49,873,389	29	120.71	70
Belarus	3,163,286	38	33.41	26	11,415,141	77	120.56	71
Czech Republic	3,060,597	39	28.82	36	12,634,937	71	118.99	78
Chile	3,058,979	40	16.94	67	23,013,147	53	127.46	47
Hungary	2,956,585	41	30.41	33	12,030,940	73	123.76	59
Malaysia	2,687,800	42	8.50	90	42,338,500	34	133.88	34
Hong Kong	2,645,752	43	35.92	20	18,340,347	60	249.02	1
Venezuela	2,610,118	44	8.16	94	24,493,687	50	76.60	146
Kazakhstan	2,573,500	45	14.14	73	26,473,000	48	145.42	22
Austria	2,511,200	46	28.75	37	14,924,340	64	170.85	8
Saudi Arabia	2,498,692	47	7.59	96	40,210,965	35	122.08	64
Denmark	2,475,382	48	43.17	6	6,978,348	99	121.71	68
Israel	2,342,000	49	28.14	38	10,540,000	80	126.66	50
Peru	2,310,217	50	7.18	100	38,915,386	37	120.98	69
Norway	2,134,105	51	40.23	11	5,721,255	107	107.84	95
Tanzania	1,848,167	52	3.22	114	39,953,860	36	69.72	153
Pakistan	1,829,673	53	0.93	128	144,525,637	10	73.36	150
Azerbaijan	1,805,214	54	18.37	62	10,127,000	81	103.05	108
Bulgaria	1,764,782	55	24.91	47	8,532,908	90	120.44	73
Finland	1,709,400	56	30.95	31	7,307,800	97	132.31	38
South Africa	1,698,360	57	2.99	115	91,878,275	17	161.99	10
Ecuador	1,683,783	58	10.13	85	13,881,562	67	83.50	137
New Zealand	1,582,000	59	33.62	25	6,400,000	102	136.00	32
Serbia	1,474,970	60	21.21	55	8,626,903	89	124.06	58
Singapore	1,470,400	61	25.76	46	8,462,800	91	148.24	18
Slovakia	1,404,751	62	25.79	45	7,117,753	98	130.66	42
Ireland	1,401,356	63	29.43	34	4,898,872	111	102.88	110
Morocco	1,378,867	64	3.86	109	43,916,066	32	122.88	62
Sri Lanka	1,220,504	65	5.85	104	28,199,083	46	135.07	33
Syrian Arab Republic	1,154,909	66	6.32	103	15,650,000	63	85.66	132
Croatia	1,095,881	67	26.16	44	4,315,580	114	103.01	109
Uruguay	949,974	68	27.48	41	5,097,569	109	147.47	19
Tunisia	801,785	69	6.95	101	14,334,080	65	124.30	56
Lithuania	798,769	70	27.64	40	4,361,329	113	150.90	14
Dominican Republic	786,458	71	7.30	99	8,769,127	87	81.44	141
Georgia	770,113	72	19.69	57	5,730,625	106	146.49	20
Costa Rica	744,059	73	15.17	69	8,840,342	83	180.20	4
Bosnia and Herzegovina	663,670	74	18.92	59	3,440,085	123	98.09	115
Puerto Rico	660,100	75	18.02	63	3,389,402	124	92.53	119
Slovenia	601,821	76	28.93	35	2,443,172	130	117.46	82
Moldova	584,330	77	14.42	71	3,662,968	120	90.42	122
Ethiopia	580,120	78	0.55	138	62,617,000	24	59.66	156
Latvia	525,679	79	26.96	42	2,464,122	129	126.39	51
Panama	446,076	80	10.88	82	5,977,641	104	145.85	21
El Salvador	442,727	81	6.94	102	9,982,186	82	156.51	13
Myanmar	404,932	82	0.76	131	47,951,228	31	89.85	123
Estonia	404,682	83	30.90	32	1,904,425	135	145.42	23
North Macedonia	386,718	84	18.56	60	2,121,805	133	101.86	111
Palestine	371,299	85	7.55	97	4,135,363	115	84.04	136
Bolivia	358,680	86	3.25	112	10,963,224	79	99.20	113
Oman	348,926	87	7.53	98	6,943,910	100	149.77	15
Trinidad and Tobago	326,776	88	23.87	50	2,030,637	134	148.32	16
Armenia	315,319	89	10.76	83	3,488,524	122	119.04	77
Cyprus	295,686	90	34.79	21	1,176,801	140	138.48	30
Albania	293,623	91	10.02	86	3,497,950	121	119.38	75
Kenya	288,303	92	0.58	137	42,815,109	33	86.15	130
Mongolia	285,093	93	9.27	89	3,886,167	118	126.35	52
Paraguay	278,169	94	4.08	108	7,468,275	95	109.65	94
Kyrgyzstan	258,013	95	4.27	107	7,369,927	96	121.92	66
Qatar	256,094	96	9.70	87	3,913,809	117	148.29	17
Mauritius	246,000	97	19.44	58	1,839,500	136	145.40	24
Jamaica	239,120	98	8.27	92	3,091,222	126	106.95	97
Honduras	232,990	99	2.51	120	8,233,499	92	88.87	125
Bahrain	213,633	100	14.31	72	2,364,477	132	158.42	11
Luxembourg	212,900	101	36.49	19	794,000	145	136.09	31
Nicaragua	210,124	102	3.38	111	8,179,876	93	131.56	39
Zimbabwe	187,310	103	1.13	127	14,092,104	66	85.25	133
Malta	181,318	104	42.09	8	560,010	149	129.98	44
Uganda	145,765	105	0.34	140	24,948,878	49	58.21	158
Côte d'Ivoire	142,825	106	0.59	136	31,747,233	42	130.68	41
Montenegro	137,426	107	21.85	53	1,044,674	141	166.10	9
Iceland	133,574	108	39.87	12	410,662	153	122.58	63
Cambodia	129,650	109	0.81	130	18,572,973	59	116.04	83
Kuwait	113,427	110	2.74	116	5,136,384	108	124.17	57
Senegal	111,795	111	0.71	134	15,758,366	62	99.42	112
Angola	96,919	112	0.33	141	13,323,952	69	44.73	162
Barbados	89,340	113	31.27	29	337,791	156	118.22	80
Bahamas	86,868	114	21.97	52	353,540	155	89.42	124
Nigeria	74,004	115	0.04	162	144,920,170	9	75.92	149
Suriname	71,217	116	12.64	77	795,871	144	141.26	27
Guyana	64,889	117	8.34	91	643,210	147	82.69	138
Namibia	63,894	118	2.52	119	2,647,853	128	104.50	106
Ghana	56,810	119	0.20	149	36,751,761	38	127.46	46
Botswana	48,901	120	2.13	122	3,240,589	125	141.41	25
Togo	45,756	121	0.59	135	6,219,981	103	79.77	142
Cameroon	42,117	122	0.18	153	19,706,027	58	81.93	140
Mozambique	41,653	123	0.14	154	11,875,506	75	40.03	167
Brunei Darussalam	41,209	124	9.61	88	544,732	150	127.07	48
Maldives	36,001	125	8.25	93	900,120	143	206.29	3
Zambia	35,912	126	0.21	148	13,438,539	68	78.61	143
Andorra	34,284	127	44.54	4	80,337	164	104.38	107
Cuba	33,536	128	0.29	143	4,613,782	112	40.17	166
Saint Lucia	31,781	129	17.77	65	176,694	158	98.80	114
Sudan	31,082	130	0.08	156	28,644,139	45	70.67	152
Haiti	29,900	131	0.27	144	6,486,549	101	59.07	157
Benin	28,833	132	0.26	146	8,773,044	86	78.50	144
Laos	27,217	133	0.40	139	3,711,813	119	54.12	161
Madagascar	25,062	134	0.10	155	8,730,499	88	34.14	170
Saint Vincent and the Grenadines	24,507	135	22.30	51	116,161	162	105.70	101
Djibouti	24,389	136	2.55	118	373,052	154	38.98	169
Bermuda	22,808	137	37.18	18	64,997	166	105.95	100
Grenada	22,235	138	20.62	56	113,177	163	104.96	103
Rwanda	21,780	139	0.18	152	8,819,217	84	72.24	151
Monaco	19,258	140	49.77	2	32,978	171	85.23	134
Gibraltar	17,373	141	50.25	1	41,035	169	118.70	79
Afghanistan	16,810	142	0.05	161	23,929,713	52	67.35	154
Bhutan	16,707	143	2.07	124	730,623	146	90.47	121
Seychelles	15,221	144	16.07	68	167,282	160	176.58	5
Gabon	14,967	145	0.74	132	2,663,243	127	131.51	40
Cabo Verde	14,493	146	2.65	117	612,259	148	112.06	92
Burkina Faso	14,067	147	0.07	159	17,946,375	61	93.50	118
Mauritania	12,637	148	0.29	142	4,074,157	116	92.17	120
San Marino	12,500	149	37.43	17	38,000	170	113.77	88
Fiji	12,135	150	1.34	125	1,033,915	142	114.18	86
Chad	10,470	151	0.07	158				
Malawi	9,220	152	0.05	160	7,772,503	94	41.74	164
Niger	8,650	153	0.04	163	8,778,884	85	40.88	165
Vanuatu	5,841	154	2.11	123	228,016	157	82.54	139
British Virgin Islands	5,524	155	17.71	66				
Lesotho	4,984	156	0.22	147	2,380,804	131	106.60	98
Burundi	3,914	157	0.04	164	5,920,612	105	54.50	160
Micronesia	3,776	158	3.58	110	23,114	172	21.90	171
Timor-Leste	3,346	159	0.26	145	1,546,624	137	119.31	76
Samoa	1,692	160	0.86	129	124,211	161	63.23	155
Comoros	1,644	161	0.20	150	446,868	152	54.90	159
Sao Tome and Principe	1,479	162	0.72	133	173,646	159	84.98	135
Solomon Islands	1,166	163	0.19	151	465,331	151	76.12	147
Democratic Republic of the Congo	1,000	164	0.00	166	35,270,156	40	43.36	163
Guinea-Bissau	629	165	0.03	165	1,434,822	139	77.09	145
Kiribati	76	166	0.07	157	46,123	168	39.63	168
American Samoa								
Anguilla								
Antigua and Barbuda								
Aruba								
Ascension								
Belize								
Cayman Islands								
Central African Republic								
Cocos (Keeling) Islands								
Republic of the Congo					5,056,000	110	96.11	117
North Korea								
Dominica								
Equatorial Guinea								
Eritrea								
Eswatini								
Falkland Islands								
Faroe Islands								
French Polynesia								
Gambia								
Greenland								
Guam								
Guatemala					19,986,482	56	118.17	81
Guernsey								
Guinea								
Iraq					33,335,316	41	87.10	129
Jersey								
Jordan								
Lebanon								
Liberia								
Libya								
Liechtenstein					46,625	167	122.95	61
Macao								
Mali								
Marshall Islands								
Mayotte								
Montserrat								
Nauru								
Nepal					36,096,396	39	123.17	60
Netherlands Antilles								
New Caledonia								
Niue								
Norfolk Island								
Northern Marianas								
Palau								
Papua New Guinea								
Saint Kitts and Nevis					76,878	165	138.91	29
Sierra Leone								
Somalia								
South Sudan					1,511,529	138	12.02	172
Saint Helena, Ascension and Tristan da Cunha								
Saint Pierre and Miquelon								
Tajikistan								
Tokelau								
Tonga								
Turkmenistan								
Turks and Caicos Islands								
Tuvalu								
United Arab Emirates					19,826,224	57	210.91	2
Vatican								
US Virgin Islands								
Wallis and Futuna								
Yemen								

== See also ==
- List of countries by number of internet users
- List of countries by number of telephone lines in use
- List of countries by smartphone penetration
- List of mobile network operators
- List of multiple-system operators
- List of telecommunications companies
