= List of countries by net migration =

Net migration rate per 1,000 people by country for 2023 (Population Reference Bureau)

This is a list of countries and territories by net migration, the difference between the number of people entering and leaving a country during a year, and by net migration rate, the population-adjusted net migration of a country, expressed as a ratio per 1,000 people (based on mid-year population).

== Method ==
An excess of people entering a country is referred to as net immigration (e.g., 3.56 migrants/1,000 population). An excess of people leaving a country is referred to as net emigration (e.g., -9.26 migrants/1,000 population). The net migration rate indicates the contribution of migration to the overall level of population change. The net migration rate does not distinguish between economic migrants, refugees, and other types of migrants nor does it distinguish between lawful migrants and undocumented migrants.

== List ==
Country or territory	Net migration (2022)	Net migration rate per 1,000 people (2023)
Syria	-734,304	45.8
Ukraine	-6,673,581	37.3
South Sudan	-30,694	20.0
Venezuela	-297,713	13.6
British Virgin Islands	200	13.2
Equatorial Guinea	4,000	13.0
Cayman Islands	400	12.3
Luxembourg	5,222	11.4
Monaco	200	10.9
Anguilla	-	10.5
Turks and Caicos Islands	200	8.4
Aruba	164	8.1
Ireland	10,000	6.8
Burundi	2,000	6.8
Cyprus	5,000	6.7
Australia	139,991	6.4
Saudi Arabia	28,998	6.1
Switzerland	39,998	6.0
South Georgia and South Sandwich Islands	-	5.9
San Marino	100	5.9
Sint Maarten	0	5.8
Canada	248,586	5.4
Malta	850	5.0
New Zealand	12,999	4.8
Liechtenstein	150	4.8
Isle of Man	340	4.5
Djibouti	900	4.4
Spain	39,998	4.2
Singapore	26,998	4.2
Belgium	23,999	4.2
Netherlands	29,998	4.1
Norway	27,998	3.8
Sweden	39,998	3.8
Gabon	1,000	3.6
New Caledonia	500	3.6
Austria	19,999	3.5
Czech Republic	22,011	3.3
Panama	7,967	3.2
Italy	58,496	3.2
Bahamas	1,000	3.2
United Kingdom	165,790	3.2
Macau	5,000	3.1
United States	998,540	3.0
Botswana	3,000	2.8
Denmark	19,999	2.7
Iceland	380	2.7
Hungary	616,038	2.6
South Korea	29,998	2.6
Suriname	-1,000	2.5
Finland	13,999	2.3
Brunei	0	2.2
Antigua and Barbuda	0	2.0
Costa Rica	3,850	2.0
Israel	9,999	1.9
Germany	154,592	1.8
Belize	600	1.8
Hong Kong	19,999	1.7
Sierra Leone	-4,000	1.7
Guernsey	-	1.6
Jersey	-	1.5
Malaysia	48,997	1.5
Slovenia	2,000	1.5
Bermuda	0	1.4
Côte d'Ivoire	6,000	1.2
Portugal	9,999	1.2
Saint Kitts and Nevis	20	1.2
France	66,601	1.1
Greece	5,000	1.0
Taiwan	-	1.0
Belarus	30,308	0.9
Russia	942,445	0.8
Seychelles	-200	0.8
Qatar	0	0.8
Japan	99,994	0.7
Palau	-20	0.6
North Macedonia	-1,000	0.4
Chile	-66,850	0.3
Zambia	-5,000	0.2
Benin	-200	0.2
India	-487,303	0.1
Mauritius	0	0
Andorra	200	0
Gambia	-3000	0
Moldova	462,866	0
Serbia	-9,999	0
Montserrat	-	0
Madagascar	-1,500	0
Namibia	-4,061	0
Malawi	-6,000	0
Guinea	-4,000	0
Saint Helena, Ascension, and Tristan da Cunha	-	0
Philippines	-69,996	0
Slovakia	425,001	0
North Korea	-2,000	0
Bhutan	300	0
Faroe Islands	0	0
Papua New Guinea	-800	0
Paraguay	-12,499	-0.1
Ethiopia	-11,999	-0.1
Congo	-1,000	-0.1
Argentina	3,886	-0.1
Afghanistan	-65,846	-0.1
China	-311,380	-0.1
Chad	-2,000	-0.1
Kenya	-10,000	-0.2
Brazil	6,425	-0.2
Angola	-1,000	-0.2
Vietnam	-82,700	-0.2
Ghana	-9,999	-0.2
Yemen	-29,998	-0.2
Nigeria	-59,996	-0.2
Thailand	18,999	-0.2
Bulgaria	-4,800	-0.3
South Africa	58,496	-0.3
Barbados	-80	-0.3
Iran	-39,998	-0.3
Cameroon	-4,800	-0.3
Croatia	-2,000	-0.3
Egypt	-29,998	-0.3
Kazakhstan	0	-0.4
Bosnia and Herzegovina	-500	-0.4
Tanzania	-39,997	-0.4
Algeria	-9,999	-0.4
Azerbaijan	0	-0.4
Oman	0	-0.5
Burkina Faso	-24,998	-0.6
Cape Verde	-1,256	-0.6
Niger	1,000	-0.6
French Polynesia	-100	-0.6
DR Congo	-14,999	-0.6
Paracel Islands	-	-0.7
Indonesia	-49,997	-0.7
Kosovo	-5,000	-0.7
Mauritania	3,000	-0.7
Senegal	-19,999	-0.7
Mexico	-51,399	-0.8
Mongolia	-850	-0.8
St. Lucia	0	-0.8
Liberia	-5,000	-0.8
Uruguay	-1,500	-0.9
Lebanon	-160,237	-0.9
Uzbekistan	-19,999	-0.9
Peru	-60,652	-0.9
Bolivia	-3,000	-1.0
Iraq	-6,000	-1.0
Bahrain	0	-1.0
Trinidad and Tobago	-800	-1.0
Pakistan	-165,988	-1.0
Ecuador	-20,206	-1.0
Laos	-9,999	-1.1
Curacao	515	-1.3
Vanuatu	0	-1.3
Saint Barthelemy	-	-1.3
Tunisia	-4,000	-1.3
Burma	-34,998	-1.4
Somalia	-30,000	-1.4
Turkey	-301,586	-1.5
Sri Lanka	-77,495	-1.5
Solomon Islands	-1,600	-1.5
Honduras	-5,374	-1.5
Mozambique	-5,000	-1.5
Sudan	-9,999	-1.6
Haiti	-32,248	-1.6
Guatemala	-9,128	-1.6
Turkmenistan	-4,000	-1.7
Morocco	-39,998	-1.7
Togo	-2,000	-1.8
Nicaragua	-8,000	-1.8
Colombia	-167,924	-1.9
Tajikistan	-19,999	-2.0
Libya	-2,000	-2.1
Comoros	-2,000	-2.2
Grenada	-200	-2.3
Cuba	-6,000	-2.5
Cambodia	-29,998	-2.7
Estonia	-1,000	-2.7
Dominican Republic	-29,294	-2.7
Kiribati	-400	-2.8
Zimbabwe	-9,999	-2.9
Bangladesh	-309,977	-2.9
Mali	-39,998	-3.0
Central African Republic	-17,463	-3.2
Albania	-8,000	-3.2
Rwanda	-8,999	-3.2
Gibraltar	-24	-3.2
Uganda	-118,846	-3.2
United Arab Emirates	0	-3.4
Guinea-Bissau	-1,400	-3.5
East Timor	-5,000	-3.8
Gaza Strip	-5,000	-3.8
Wallis and Futuna	-	-3.8
Tokelau	-	-3.8
West Bank	-5,000	-3.9
Romania	916,813	-3.9
Kuwait	11,999	-4.1
Nepal	-62,012	-4.3
Georgia	-9,999	-4.3
Lithuania	-15,192	-4.3
Marshall Islands	0	-4.3
Lesotho	-4,000	-4.5
Kyrgyzstan	-9,999	-4.8
Montenegro	-480	-5.0
Greenland	-100	-5.0
Latvia	-8,466	-5.1
Dominica	-40	-5.3
Armenia	-5,000	-5.3
Svalbard	-	-5.6
Fiji	-3,557	-5.7
Saint Vincent and the Grenadines	-200	-6.1
Poland	-330,820	-6.1
Eswatini	-5,733	-6.1
Saint Martin	0	-6.2
Tuvalu	-60	-6.4
São Tomé and Príncipe	-600	-6.8
Guyana	-3,900	-7.0
El Salvador	-23,249	-7.0
Saint Pierre and Miquelon	-	-7.1
Samoa	-1,500	-7.2
U.S. Virgin Islands	-450	-7.3
Jamaica	-10,999	-7.4
Eritrea	-17,152	-9.4
Nauru	-140	-10.2
Puerto Rico	16,702	-10.8
Guam	-500	-10.9
Jordan	-141,192	-11.0
Maldives	-8,011	-12.8
Northern Mariana Islands	-50	-13.5
Tonga	-800	-18.1
Micronesia	-600	-20.9
Cook Islands	-	-26.2
American Samoa	-810	-27.4

== See also ==
- List of sovereign states by immigrant and emigrant population
