= List of countries by birth rate =

Countries by birth rate

This article includes two versions of the list of countries by crude birth rate.

== Methodology ==
Crude birth rate refers to the number of births over a given period divided by the person-years lived by the population over that period.

It is expressed as number of births per 1,000 population.

The article lists 233 countries and territories in crude birth rate.

The first list is provided by Population Reference Bureau.

The second list is based on CIA World Factbook estimates for the year 2023.

Dependent territories and not fully recognized states might not be ranked.

== List ==
Country/territory	PRB 2022	CIA WF 2023
Niger	45	46.86
Angola	39	41.42
Benin	36	40.72
Mali	42	40.54
Uganda	37	40.27
Chad	43	39.85
Congo DR	42	39.64
Somalia	44	37.71
South Sudan	29	37.07
Mozambique	37	36.94
Liberia	31	36.26
Guinea-Bissau	31	36.25
Guinea	34	35.47
Cameroon	35	35.13
Burundi	35	34.87
Afghanistan	36	34.79
Zambia	34	34.48
Nigeria	37	34.00
Sudan	34	33.32
Tanzania	36	32.90
Zimbabwe	31	32.77
Burkina Faso	35	32.71
Central African Republic	43	32.37
Congo	31	31.55
Sierra Leone	33	31.49
Togo	32	31.39
Senegal	32	30.84
Timor-Leste	25	30.36
Ethiopia	32	29.97
Equatorial Guinea	30	29.46
Papua New Guinea	26	28.54
Madagascar	35	28.14
Ghana	28	28.04
Gambia	33	28.03
Cote d'Ivoire	34	27.92
Mauritania	39	27.61
São Tomé and Príncipe	28	27.43
Malawi	33	27.29
Palestine/Gaza Strip		27.20
Eritrea	29	26.72
Kenya	28	26.01
Pakistan	28	26.01
Gabon	27	25.89
Rwanda	30	25.70
Namibia	27	24.68
Iraq	27	24.22
Yemen	30	24.05
Lesotho	26	23.01
Eswatini (Swaziland)	24	22.83
Jordan	18	22.37
Solomon Islands	30	22.34
Tuvalu	25	22.34
Syria	20	22.19
Philippines	22	22.17
Comoros	29	22.06
Djibouti	22	22.03
Guatemala	21	21.88
Oman	19	21.62
Marshall Islands	19	21.61
Vanuatu	29	21.19
Belize	17	20.93
Libya	17	20.88
Haiti	23	20.81
Nauru	28	20.71
Egypt	21	20.48
Laos	21	20.35
Tajikistan	27	20.28
Tonga	23	20.02
Botswana	24	19.95
Kiribati	27	19.92
Kyrgyzstan	24	19.08
Samoa	29	19.03
Cambodia	22	18.75
Guam (USA)	17	18.33
South Africa	20	18.24
Cape Verde	15	18.19
Micronesia		18.12
World (2020)		18.10
Bolivia	22	18.08
Algeria	22	17.84
Dominican Republic	18	17.80
Panama	15	17.71
Kuwait	12	17.65
Honduras	21	17.64
Bangladesh	18	17.50
El Salvador	16	17.49
Israel	20	17.30
Nepal	20	17.26
Turkmenistan	22	17.16
Morocco	17	17.10
Venezuela	16	16.99
Peru	17	16.96
Guyana	20	16.74
India	20	16.53
Nicaragua	19	16.30
Fiji	19	16.25
Ecuador	17	16.19
American Samoa		16.18
Paraguay	21	16.15
Myanmar	17	16.04
Brunei	14	15.98
Jamaica	12	15.77
Bhutan	14	15.61
Northern Mariana Islands (USA)		15.60
Argentina	14	15.38
Mongolia	22	15.37
Maldives	13	15.33
Vietnam	15	15.29
Uzbekistan	26	15.18
Suriname	17	15.17
Colombia	15	15.06
Indonesia	16	15.05
Antigua and Barbuda	12	15.01
Faroe Islands (Denmark)		14.94
Kazakhstan	23	14.92
Iran	14	14.79
Kosovo	15	14.57
Bahamas	11	14.49
Malaysia	14	14.39
North Korea	13	14.06
Tunisia	16	14.05
Turkey	13	14.04
Costa Rica	11	14.03
New Caledonia (France)	14	13.96
Mexico	15	13.95
Saint Martin (France)		13.95
Saudi Arabia	17	13.90
Gibraltar (UK)		13.84
Greenland (Denmark)		13.66
Dominica	13	13.64
Grenada	16	13.61
Sri Lanka	13	13.61
Turks and Caicos Islands (UK)		13.24
French Polynesia	13	13.22
Azerbaijan	13	13.20
Curacao (Netherlands)		13.07
Lebanon	15	12.86
Iceland	13	12.80
New Zealand	11	12.69
Uruguay	10	12.65
Chile	11	12.57
Albania	10	12.48
Sint Maarten (Netherlands)		12.41
Cook Islands (New Zealand)		12.34
Jersey (Channel Islands, UK)		12.31
Bahrain	12	12.30
Australia	12	12.23
United States	11	12.21
Seychelles	17	12.10
Saint Vincent and the Grenadines		12.09
Ireland	12	12.08
Saint Kitts and Nevis		12.06
Wallis and Futuna (France)		12.05
Anguilla (UK)		11.90
Norway	10	11.89
Saint Lucia	12	11.73
Aruba (Netherlands)		11.69
Cayman Islands (UK)		11.62
Luxembourg	10	11.59
Palau	15	11.57
France	11	11.56
United States Virgin Islands		11.35
Denmark	11	11.25
Montenegro	11	11.04
Netherlands	10	10.98
Bermuda (UK)		10.97
British Virgin Islands		10.90
Belgium	10	10.86
Armenia	12	10.80
United Kingdom	10	10.80
Georgia	12	10.79
Sweden	11	10.76
United Arab Emirates	10	10.76
Barbados	8	10.73
Brazil	11	10.67
Montserrat (UK)		10.66
Trinidad and Tobago	11	10.62
Isle of Man (UK)		10.49
Cyprus	10	10.37
Finland	9	10.33
North Macedonia		10.33
Liechtenstein	9	10.30
Switzerland	10	10.30
Canada	10	10.11
Thailand	10	10.04
Cuba	9	9.99
Moldova	11	9.94
Mauritius	10	9.82
Guernsey (Channel Islands, UK)		9.73
China	7	9.7
Malta	9	9.59
Austria	10	9.39
Saint Helena, Ascension and Tristan da Cunha (UK)		9.33
Saint Barthélemy (France)		9.30
Qatar	10	9.27
Russia	10	9.22
Lithuania	9	9.09
Germany	10	9.02
Singapore	9	8.94
San Marino	6	8.88
Belarus	9	8.87
Serbia	9	8.87
Macau (China)		8.82
Ukraine	7	8.79
Slovakia	10	8.78
Romania	9	8.63
Croatia	9	8.60
Hungary	9	8.58
Latvia	9	8.50
Estonia	9	8.48
Czech Republic	11	8.43
Bosnia and Herzegovina	7	8.31
Poland	9	8.31
Slovenia	9	8.12
Portugal	8	7.99
Bulgaria	9	7.97
Hong Kong (China)		7.85
Puerto Rico (USA)	6	7.84
Greece	8	7.52
Taiwan	7	7.33
Spain	7	7.12
Italy	7	7.00
South Korea	5	6.95
Japan	7	6.90
Andorra	6	6.87
Monaco	25	6.61
Saint Pierre and Miquelon (France)		6.54
Palestine	29	
Western Sahara (Sahrawi)	17	
Guadeloupe (France)	11	
French Guiana	27	
Martinique (France)	10	
Mayotte (France)	34	
Réunion (France)	16	

Note: There is no data for Christmas Island (Australia), Cocos (Keeling) Islands (Australia), Falkland Islands (UK), Niue (New Zealand), Norfolk Island (Australia), Pitcairn Islands (UK), Svalbard (Norway), Tokelau (New Zealand) and Vatican City.

== See also ==
- List of countries by number of births
- List of countries by total fertility rate
- List of countries by population growth rate
- Overshoot (population)
- Population pyramid
- Global catastrophic risk
