= List of countries by internet connection speeds =

This is a list of countries by internet connection speed for average and median data transfer rates for internet access by end-users. The difference between average and median speeds is the way individual measurements are aggregated. Average speeds are more commonly used but can give a wrong impression of the actual user experience, since fast connections can bias the average results. Median results represent the point where half the population has faster and the other half of the population has slower data transfer rates.

== Fixed broadband ==
This is a sortable list of broadband internet connection speed by country, ranked by Speedtest.net data for March 2026.

Country/Territory	Median download speed (Mbit/s)
Singapore	425.46
United Arab Emirates	384.51
Hong Kong	352.40
France	352.35
Iceland	347.30
Chile	334.99
Macau	318.05
United States	309.80
Switzerland	292.56
Denmark	291.60
Romania	283.06
Vietnam	281.72
Israel	281.29
Thailand	279.65
Spain	277.98
Canada	277.70
Taiwan	270.85
Peru	258.37
South Korea	257.76
Japan	255.27
Hungary	251.72
Portugal	243.84
Netherlands	237.66
Kuwait	230.24
Poland	223.25
Brazil	221.53
Luxembourg	221.23
Ireland	220.71
Panama	219.49
Lithuania	218.67
Colombia	214.30
Sweden	213.29
Qatar	211.97
Malta	209.61
China	206.91
New Zealand	201.91
Slovenia	200.99
Jordan	194.10
Uruguay	181.44
Finland	180.47
Norway	177.11
United Kingdom	172.24
Ecuador	169.66
Costa Rica	169.03
Malaysia	168.07
Saudi Arabia	167.93
Cyprus	165.55
Trinidad and Tobago	158.25
Australia	154.09
Moldova	153.46
Latvia	146.87
Bahrain	145.88
Montenegro	144.78
Guyana	141.12
Belgium	140.97
Croatia	136.75
Paraguay	118.56
Italy	117.11
Slovakia	114.33
Austria	114.00
Argentina	111.54
Philippines	109.86
El Salvador	108.77
Mexico	104.25
Germany	103.72
Serbia	102.35
Venezuela	100.11
Oman	96.05
Estonia	95.32
Nicaragua	95.11
Grenada	94.79
Bulgaria	94.44
Greece	94.29
Albania	93.64
Uzbekistan	93.35
Guatemala	92.98
Czech Republic	92.71
Egypt	92.50
Ukraine	92.24
Honduras	92.00
Azerbaijan	91.37
Russia	91.29
Belarus	90.61
Brunei	90.29
Kosovo	89.32
Kazakhstan	88.10
Kyrgyzstan	87.14
Jamaica	86.55
Palestine	85.12
Nepal	84.34
Armenia	84.16
Bahamas	83.79
Mongolia	83.35
Turkey	80.02
Suriname	74.20
Dominican Republic	72.63
Bolivia	67.01
Bangladesh	66.02
Ivory Coast	62.70
Mauritius	61.24
India	60.85
Algeria	59.95
North Macedonia	56.88
Mauritania	56.45
Laos	56.30
Morocco	56.22
Cambodia	53.08
Haiti	52.33
Belize	50.45
Burkina Faso	50.02
Ghana	49.64
South Africa	48.90
Botswana	47.78
DR Congo	46.07
Indonesia	45.91
Antigua and Barbuda	45.11
Tajikistan	45.10
Georgia	44.73
Iraq	44.19
Rwanda	43.52
Mozambique	40.68
Gabon	39.17
Sri Lanka	38.61
Senegal	38.06
Nigeria	36.81
Bosnia and Herzegovina	36.80
Maldives	36.72
Togo	35.17
Zambia	32.92
Madagascar	32.50
Myanmar	30.94
Benin	30.60
Zimbabwe	30.40
Uganda	30.25
Iran	26.00
Mali	24.20
Tanzania	23.84
Angola	22.87
Somalia	21.22
Tunisia	20.24
Lebanon	19.90
Djibouti	18.06
Pakistan	17.90
Guinea	17.81
Cameroon	17.41
Namibia	17.01
Kenya	16.48
Yemen	16.07
Libya	11.65
Ethiopia	11.17
Afghanistan	4.93
Syria	4.24
Cuba	3.83

== Mobile connection ==
This is a sortable list of mobile connection speed by country, ranked by Speedtest.net data for March 2026.

Country/Territory	Median download speed (Mbit/s)
United Arab Emirates	644.66
Qatar	576.06
Kuwait	372.76
Bahrain	274.94
Brazil	265.79
South Korea	265.20
Brunei	253.69
Saudi Arabia	226.53
Bulgaria	221.03
United States	213.29
Vietnam	200.54
Singapore	197.89
Denmark	192.16
Estonia	188.58
Cambodia	181.12
Netherlands	178.00
Luxembourg	173.19
Oman	169.87
Norway	167.28
North Macedonia	166.15
Serbia	164.60
Finland	164.00
Sweden	161.70
Georgia	161.23
Latvia	157.04
China	156.98
Malaysia	153.20
France	152.50
Kosovo	151.95
Slovenia	145.54
Greece	144.40
Croatia	138.90
Thailand	137.98
Portugal	137.64
Belgium	134.77
Lithuania	134.23
India	126.73
Switzerland	124.08
Poland	122.33
New Zealand	122.18
Slovakia	122.09
Taiwan	117.38
Australia	116.84
Austria	114.61
Canada	110.92
Turkey	110.40
Montenegro	104.59
Cyprus	104.48
Czech Republic	101.52
Azerbaijan	95.43
Kazakhstan	93.68
Hungary	93.03
Italy	92.81
Spain	92.32
Hong Kong	89.43
Romania	87.32
Chile	82.21
Ireland	79.12
Morocco	77.54
Armenia	77.50
United Kingdom	75.91
Germany	74.58
Japan	70.28
Costa Rica	69.43
South Africa	68.09
Israel	65.96
Iraq	64.74
Algeria	64.05
Ecuador	62.93
Argentina	62.64
Indonesia	62.09
Moldova	61.14
Guatemala	58.38
Philippines	58.24
Suriname	57.83
Iran	57.23
Sri Lanka	57.14
Uzbekistan	55.19
Tunisia	52.84
Kyrgyzstan	52.64
Ukraine	51.61
Nigeria	50.53
Egypt	49.42
Kenya	48.78
Jordan	45.86
Colombia	45.09
Laos	44.63
Mexico	44.08
Honduras	42.77
Bangladesh	42.45
El Salvador	40.97
Lebanon	40.62
Peru	40.02
Panama	33.26
Tanzania	32.34
Belarus	29.89
Venezuela	29.39
Bosnia and Herzegovina	28.41
Syria	28.27
Pakistan	26.46
Paraguay	26.22
Libya	22.89
Afghanistan	15.91
Bolivia	15.24
Eritrea	4.75

== See also ==
- List of countries by number of internet users
