= List of countries by number of telephone lines in use =

This is a list of countries by number of telephone lines. Data are from the CIA World Factbook unless otherwise specified.

| Location | Lines | Year | |
|---|---|---|---|
| World | 876,144,000 | | (Note: Sum of CIA figures.) |
| China | 179,414,000 | 2022 | |
| United States | 91,623,000 | 2022 | |
| Japan | 60,721,000 | 2022 | |
| Germany | 38,580,000 | 2022 | |
| France | 37,740,000 | 2022 | |
| United Kingdom | 29,798,000 | 2022 | |
| Iran | 29,342,000 | 2022 | |
| India | 27,450,000 | 2022 | |
| Brazil | 27,258,000 | 2022 | |
| Mexico | 27,185,000 | 2022 | |
| Russia | 23,864,000 | 2021 | |
| South Korea | 22,810,000 | 2022 | |
| Italy | 19,982,000 | 2022 | |
| Spain | 18,687,000 | 2022 | |
| Egypt | 11,600,000 | 2022 | |
| Canada | 11,312,000 | 2022 | |
| Turkey | 11,198,000 | 2022 | |
| Taiwan | 10,000,000 | 2023 | |
| Malaysia | 8,453,000 | 2022 | |
| Indonesia | 8,424,000 | 2022 | |
| Argentina | 7,615,000 | 2022 | |
| Colombia | 7,588,000 | 2022 | |
| Saudi Arabia | 6,773,000 | 2022 | |
| Australia | 6,409,000 | 2022 | |
| Uzbekistan | 5,686,000 | 2022 | |
| Algeria | 5,576,000 | 2022 | |
| Portugal | 5,437,000 | 2022 | |
| Poland | 5,277,000 | 2022 | |
| Greece | 4,907,000 | 2022 | |
| Philippines | 4,885,000 | 2022 | |
| Netherlands | 4,570,000 | 2022 | |
| Thailand | 4,368,000 | 2022 | |
| Belarus | 4,230,000 | 2022 | |
| Hong Kong | 3,673,000 | 2022 | |
| Israel | 3,574,000 | 2022 | |
| Austria | 3,544,000 | 2022 | |
| Venezuela | 3,147,000 | 2022 | |
| Belgium | 2,953,000 | 2022 | |
| Switzerland | 2,919,000 | 2022 | |
| Kazakhstan | 2,888,000 | 2022 | |
| Hungary | 2,845,000 | 2022 | |
| Syria | 2,821,000 | 2021 | |
| Pakistan | 2,799,000 | 2022 | |
| Morocco | 2,645,000 | 2022 | |
| Sri Lanka | 2,582,000 | 2022 | |
| Serbia | 2,539,000 | 2022 | |
| Iraq | 2,392,000 | 2022 | |
| Vietnam | 2,391,000 | 2022 | |
| United Arab Emirates | 2,286,000 | 2022 | |
| Romania | 2,222,000 | 2022 | |
| Chile | 2,217,000 | 2022 | |
| Guatemala | 1,918,000 | 2022 | |
| Singapore | 1,906,000 | 2022 | |
| Peru | 1,798,000 | 2022 | |
| Tunisia | 1,790,000 | 2022 | |
| Ukraine | 1,739,000 | 2022 | |
| Ecuador | 1,644,000 | 2022 | |
| Azerbaijan | 1,641,000 | 2022 | |
| Cuba | 1,574,000 | 2022 | |
| Ireland | 1,498,000 | 2022 | |
| South Africa | 1,310,000 | 2022 | |
| Laos | 1,300,000 | 2021 | |
| Sweden | 1,261,000 | 2021 | |
| Uruguay | 1,259,000 | 2022 | |
| Yemen | 1,240,000 | 2021 | |
| Croatia | 1,235,000 | 2022 | |
| Libya | 1,218,000 | 2022 | |
| Czech Republic | 1,214,000 | 2022 | |
| North Korea | 1,180,000 | 2021 | |
| Dominican Republic | 1,144,000 | 2022 | |
| Moldova | 951,000 | 2022 | |
| Cameroon | 929,000 | 2022 | |
| Lebanon | 875,000 | 2021 | |
| El Salvador | 863,000 | 2022 | |
| Ethiopia | 862,000 | 2022 | |
| Panama | 811,000 | 2022 | |
| Turkmenistan | 802,000 | 2021 | |
| New Zealand | 757,000 | 2022 | |
| Puerto Rico | 739,000 | 2022 | |
| Nepal | 726,000 | 2021 | |
| Denmark | 712,000 | 2022 | |
| Bulgaria | 691,000 | 2022 | |
| Slovenia | 676,000 | 2022 | |
| Bosnia and Herzegovina | 651,000 | 2022 | |
| Kuwait | 573,000 | 2022 | |
| Oman | 563,000 | 2022 | |
| Bolivia | 550,000 | 2021 | |
| Slovakia | 541,000 | 2022 | |
| Burma | 535,000 | 2022 | |
| Qatar | 524,000 | 2022 | |
| Tajikistan | 502,000 | 2021 | |
| Costa Rica | 492,000 | 2022 | |
| Mongolia | 475,000 | 2022 | |
| Jordan | 466,000 | 2022 | |
| Mauritius | 462,000 | 2022 | |
| West Bank | 458,000 | 2022 | |
| Gaza Strip | 458,000 | 2022 | |
| Jamaica | 447,000 | 2022 | |
| North Macedonia | 436,000 | 2022 | |
| Honduras | 414,000 | 2022 | |
| Kosovo | 383,763 | 2022 | |
| Armenia | 366,000 | 2022 | |
| Ghana | 330,000 | 2022 | |
| Trinidad and Tobago | 326,000 | 2022 | |
| Mali | 307,000 | 2022 | |
| Georgia | 301,000 | 2022 | |
| Kyrgyzstan | 299,000 | 2021 | |
| Senegal | 297,000 | 2022 | |
| Cyprus | 297,000 | 2022 | |
| Zimbabwe | 291,000 | 2022 | |
| Bangladesh | 274,000 | 2022 | |
| Estonia | 266,000 | 2022 | |
| Ivory Coast | 263,000 | 2022 | |
| Luxembourg | 261,000 | 2022 | |
| Malta | 259,000 | 2022 | |
| Bahrain | 253,000 | 2022 | |
| Lithuania | 250,000 | 2022 | |
| Nicaragua | 216,000 | 2022 | |
| Montenegro | 191,000 | 2022 | |
| Finland | 186,000 | 2022 | |
| Albania | 177,000 | 2022 | |
| Latvia | 174,000 | 2022 | |
| Paraguay | 169,000 | 2022 | |
| Papua New Guinea | 166,000 | 2021 | |
| Sudan | 156,000 | 2022 | |
| Afghanistan | 146,000 | 2021 | |
| Norway | 140,000 | 2022 | |
| French Polynesia | 139,000 | 2022 | |
| Guyana | 125,000 | 2021 | |
| Brunei | 122,000 | 2022 | |
| Barbados | 121,000 | 2022 | |
| Uganda | 117,000 | 2022 | |
| Suriname | 108,000 | 2022 | |
| Nigeria | 97,000 | 2022 | |
| Zambia | 96,000 | 2022 | |
| Angola | 94,000 | 2022 | |
| Iceland | 93,000 | 2022 | |
| Botswana | 92,000 | 2022 | |
| Macau | 92,000 | 2022 | |
| Somalia | 91,000 | 2022 | |
| Namibia | 86,000 | 2022 | |
| Bahamas | 86,000 | 2022 | |
| Tanzania | 85,000 | 2022 | |
| Burkina Faso | 81,000 | 2021 | |
| US Virgin Islands | 76,000 | 2021 | |
| Guam | 70,000 | 2021 | |
| Togo | 66,000 | 2022 | |
| Eritrea | 66,000 | 2021 | |
| Kenya | 63,000 | 2022 | |
| Gambia | 60,000 | 2021 | |
| Niger | 58,000 | 2021 | |
| Cape Verde | 57,000 | 2022 | |
| Curacao | 53,000 | 2021 | |
| Andorra | 51,000 | 2022 | |
| Fiji | 49,000 | 2021 | |
| Jersey | 48,122 | 2021 | |
| Mauritania | 48,000 | 2022 | |
| New Caledonia | 46,000 | 2021 | |
| Monaco | 45,000 | 2022 | |
| Gabon | 43,000 | 2022 | |
| Eswatini | 38,000 | 2022 | |
| Cambodia | 38,000 | 2022 | |
| Cayman Islands | 36,000 | 2021 | |
| Aruba | 35,000 | 2021 | |
| Guernsey | 33,930 | 2021 | |
| Mozambique | 29,000 | 2022 | |
| Djibouti | 28,000 | 2022 | |
| Antigua and Barbuda | 27,000 | 2021 | |
| Grenada | 26,000 | 2021 | |
| Madagascar | 26,000 | 2022 | |
| Bermuda | 25,000 | 2021 | |
| British Virgin Islands | 23,000 | 2021 | |
| Bhutan | 20,000 | 2022 | |
| Northern Mariana Islands | 20,000 | 2021 | |
| Seychelles | 19,000 | 2022 | |
| Belize | 19,000 | 2021 | |
| Republic of the Congo | 17,000 | 2020 | |
| Gibraltar | 17,000 | 2022 | |
| San Marino | 16,000 | 2022 | |
| Saint Kitts and Nevis | 16,000 | 2021 | |
| Faroe Islands | 15,000 | 2021 | |
| Burundi | 15,000 | 2022 | |
| Saint Lucia | 14,000 | 2021 | |
| Maldives | 13,000 | 2022 | |
| Equatorial Guinea | 11,000 | 2022 | |
| Saint Vincent and the Grenadines | 11,000 | 2022 | |
| Tonga | 11,000 | 2021 | |
| Liechtenstein | 11,000 | 2022 | |
| Rwanda | 10,000 | 2022 | |
| American Samoa | 10,000 | 2021 | |
| Malawi | 9,000 | 2022 | |
| Palau | 8,000 | 2022 | |
| Cook Islands | 7,000 | 2021 | |
| Lesotho | 7,000 | 2022 | |
| Solomon Islands | 7,000 | 2021 | |
| Dominica | 7,000 | 2021 | |
| Micronesia | 7,000 | 2021 | |
| Comoros | 7,000 | 2022 | |
| Greenland | 6,000 | 2020 | |
| Anguilla | 6,000 | 2021 | |
| Liberia | 6,000 | 2021 | |
| Haiti | 6,000 | 2021 | |
| Samoa | 5,000 | 2022 | |
| Chad | 5,000 | 2022 | |
| Guinea-Bissau | 4,800 | 2009 | |
| Saint Pierre and Miquelon | 4,800 | 2015 | |
| Saint Helena, Ascension, and Tristan da Cunha | 4,000 | 2021 | |
| Turks and Caicos Islands | 4,000 | 2021 | |
| Wallis and Futuna | 3,000 | 2021 | |
| Vanuatu | 3,000 | 2022 | |
| Montserrat | 3,000 | 2020 | |
| Sao Tome and Principe | 3,000 | 2022 | |
| East Timor | 2,000 | 2022 | |
| Marshall Islands | 2,000 | 2014 | |
| Central African Republic | 2,000 | 2021 | |
| Tuvalu | 2,000 | 2021 | |
| Benin | 2,000 | 2022 | |
| Falkland Islands | 2,000 | 2021 | |
| Niue | 1,000 | 2021 | |
| Tokelau | 300 | 2010 | |
| Sierra Leone | 269 | 2021 | |
| Guinea | 0 | 2021 | |
| Kiribati | 0 | 2022 | |
| Democratic Republic of the Congo | 0 | 2021 | |

== See also ==
- List of sovereign states by number of broadband Internet subscriptions
- List of countries by number of Internet users
- List of countries by smartphone penetration
- List of mobile network operators
- List of multiple-system operators
- List of telecommunications companies
