= List of countries by smartphone penetration =

This is a list of countries by smartphone penetration. These numbers are based on the top countries by percentage of population owning a smartphone (so smaller countries are absent) and come from Newzoo's Global Mobile Market Report (the numbers were last updated in June 2021).

== 2022 rankings ==
Rank	Country/Region	Total population	Smartphone users	Smartphone penetration
1	China	1430.00M	974.69M	68.4%
2	India	1420.00M	659.00M	46.5%
3	United States	338.29M	276.14M	81.6%
4	Indonesia	275.50M	187.70M	68.1%
5	Brazil	215.31M	143.43M	66.6%
6	Russia	144.71M	106.44M	73.6%
7	Japan	123.95M	97.44M	78.6%
8	Nigeria	218.54M	83.34M	38.1%
9	Mexico	127.50M	78.37M	61.5%
10	Pakistan	235.82M	72.90M	31.0%

== 2021 rankings ==
Rank	Country/Region	Total population	Smartphone users	Smartphone penetration
1	China	1440M	865.04M	59.9%
2	India	1390M	606.57M	43.5%
3	United States	332.92M	240.15M	72.1%
4	Indonesia	276.36M	178.96M	64.8%
5	Brazil	212.56M	109.34M	51.4%
6	Russia	145.91M	102.24M	70.1%
7	Japan	126.05M	94.78M	75.2%
8	Mexico	130.26M	77.31M	59.4%
9	Nigeria	211.4M	72.03M	34.1%
10	Philippines	111.05M	67.37M	60.7%

== 2020 rankings ==
Newzoo's 2020 Global Mobile Market Report shows countries/markets sorted by smartphone penetration (percentage of population actively using a smartphone). These numbers come from Newzoo's Global Mobile Market Report 2020 - Light Version.

Rank	Country/Region	Total population	Smartphone penetration	Smartphone users
1	United States	331M	81.6%	270M
2	United Kingdom	67.89M	78.9%	53.58M
3	Germany	83.78M	77.9%	65.24M
4	France	65.27M	77.6%	50.66M
5	South Korea	51.27M	76.5%	39.2M
6	Italy	60.94M	85%	52.4M
7	Russia	145.93M	68.5%	99.93M
8	China	1.44B	63.4%	911.92M
9	Vietnam	97.34M	63.1%	61.37M
10	Iran	83.99M	62.9%	52.81M
11	Turkey	84.34M	61.7%	52.06M
12	Japan	126.48M	59.9%	75.77M
13	Indonesia	273.52M	58.6%	160.23M
14	Mexico	128.93M	54.4%	70.14M
15	Thailand	69.8M	54.3%	37.88M
16	Brazil	212.56M	51.4%	109.34M
17	Philippines	109.58M	37.7%	41.31M
18	Bangladesh	164.69M	32.4%	53.3M
19	India	1.38B	31.8%	439.42M
20	Pakistan	220.89M	18.4%	40.59M

== 2019 rankings ==
Newzoo's 2019 Global Mobile Market Report shows countries/markets sorted by smartphone penetration (percentage of population actively using a smartphone). These numbers come from Newzoo's Global Mobile Market Report 2019 - Light Version.

Rank	Country/Region	Total population	Smartphone penetration	Smartphone users
1	United Kingdom	67.0m	82.9%	55.5m
2	Germany	82.4m	79.9%	65.9m
3	United States	329.1m	79.1%	260.2m
4	France	65.5m	77.5%	50.7m
5	Spain	46.4m	74.3%	34.5m
6	South Korea	51.3m	70.4%	36.1m
7	Russia	143.9m	66.3%	95.4m
8	Italy	59.2m	60.8%	36.0m
9	China	1.42b	59.9%	851.2m
10	Japan	126.9m	57.2%	72.6m
11	Iran	82.8m	54.8%	45.4m
12	Turkey	83.0m	54.0%	44.8m
13	Mexico	132.3m	49.5%	65.6m
14	Brazil	212.4m	45.6%	96.9m
15	Vietnam	97.4m	44.9%	43.7m
16	Philippines	108.1m	33.6%	36.3m
17	Indonesia	269.5m	31.1%	83.9m
18	India	1.3b	25.3%	345.9m
19	Bangladesh	168.1m	18.5%	31.0m
20	Pakistan	204.6m	15.9%	32.5m

== 2018 rankings ==
Newzoo's 2018 Global Mobile Market Report shows countries/markets sorted by smartphone penetration (percentage of population). These numbers come from Newzoo's Global Mobile Market Report 2018. By total number of smartphone users, "China by far has the most, boasting 783 million users. India took the #2 spot with 375 million users (less than half of China’s number). However, that gap will decrease by 2021, when we expect India to have 601 million smartphone users. The U.S. came in at #3, accounting for 252 million of the world’s smartphones."

Rank	Country/Region	Total population	Smartphone penetration	Smartphone users
1	United Kingdom	66,574,000	83%	54,713,000
2	Netherlands	17,084,000	79.3%	13,547,000
3	Sweden	9,983,000	78.8%	7,864,000
4	Germany	82,293,000	78.8%	64,830,000
5	United States	326,767,000	77.0%	251,688,000
6	Belgium	11,499,000	76.6%	8,813,000
7	France	65,233,000	76.0%	32,598,000
8	Spain	46,397,000	72.5%	33,631,000
9	Canada	36,954,000	72.1%	26,635,000
10	Australia	24,772,000	68.6%	16,999,000
11	South Korea	51,164,000	68.0%	34,562,000
12	Kazakhstan	18,404,000	64.9%	11,938,000
13	Poland	38,105,000	64.0%	24,371,000
14	Russia	143,965,000	63.8%	91,865,000
15	Taiwan	23,694,000	60.0%	14,223,000
16	Italy	59,291,000	58.0%	34,394,000
17	Malaysia	32,042,000	57.5%	18,437,000
18	Japan	127,185,000	55.3%	70,327,000
19	China	1,415,046,000	55.3%	782,848,000
20	Romania	19,581,000	53.8%	10,538,000
21	Ukraine	44,009,000	48.3%	21,276,000
22	Argentina	44,689,000	46.9%	20,979,000
23	Saudi Arabia	33,554,000	46.0%	15,449,000
24	Mexico	130,759,000	45.6%	59,597,000
25	Philippines	106,512,000	44.9%	47,858,000
26	Chile	18,197,000	44.2%	8,049,000
27	Thailand	69,183,000	43.7%	30,217,000
28	Brazil	210,868,000	41.3%	87,172,000
29	Venezuela	32,381,000	40.8%	13,224,000
30	Colombia	49,465,000	39.8%	19,669,000
31	Morocco	36,192,000	37.9%	13,707,000
32	Turkey	81,917,000	37.9%	31,060,000
33	Vietnam	96,491,000	37.7%	36,378,000
34	South Africa	57,398,000	35.5%	20,371,000
35	Iran, Republic of	82,012,000	64.6%	53,200,000
36	Peru	32,552,000	32.1%	10,462,000
37	Uzbekistan	32,365,000	31.3%	10,142,000
38	Algeria	42,008,000	29.1%	12,204,000
39	Egypt	99,376,000	28.0%	27,852,000
40	India	1,354,052,000	27.7%	374,893,000
41	Indonesia	266,795,000	27.4%	73,155,000
42	Ghana	29,464,000	24.0%	7,060,000
43	Myanmar	53,856,000	21.8%	11,722,000
44	Kenya	50,951,000	20.9%	10,668,000
45	Sudan	41,512,000	19.7%	8,176,000
46	Bangladesh	166,368,000	16.1%	26,827,000
47	Uganda	44,271,000	15.6%	6,922,000
48	Pakistan	200,814,000	13.8%	27,730,000
49	Nigeria	195,875,000	13.0%	25,552,000
50	Ethiopia	107,535,000	11.2%	12,014,000

== 2017 rankings ==
Newzoo's 2017 Global Mobile Market Report shows countries/markets sorted by smartphone penetration (percentage of population). These numbers come from Newzoo's Global Mobile Market Report 2017

Rank	Country/Region	Total Population	Smartphone Penetration	Smartphone Users
1	United Arab Emirates	9,398,000	80.6%	7,573,000
2	Sweden	9,921,000	72.2%	7,167,000
3	Switzerland	8,454,000	71.7%	6,061,000
4	South Korea	50,705,000	71.5%	36,262,000
5	Taiwan	23,564,000	70.4%	16,596,000
6	Canada	36,626,000	69.8%	25,556,000
7	United States	326,474,000	69.3%	226,289,000
8	Netherlands	17,033,000	68.8%	11,720,000
9	Germany	80,636,000	68.8%	55,492,000
10	United Kingdom	65,511,000	68.6%	44,953,000
11	Australia	24,642,000	67.7%	16,671,000
12	Belgium	11,444,000	67.3%	7,706,000
13	Spain	46,070,000	66.8%	30,771,000
14	Azerbaijan	9,974,000	66.4%	6,619,000
15	Italy	59,798,000	65.8%	39,323,000
16	France	64,939,000	65.3%	42,399,000
17	Saudi Arabia	32,743,000	65.2%	21,337,000
18	Portugal	10,265,000	65.0%	6,672,000
19	Czech Republic	10,555,000	64.8%	6,835,000
20	Malaysia	31,164,000	64.1%	19,967,000
21	Poland	38,564,000	63.4%	24,431,000
22	Greece	10,893,000	59.5%	6,484,000
23	Chile	18,313,000	56.0%	10,254,000
24	Romania	19,238,000	56.0%	10,772,000
25	Russia	143,375,000	54.7%	78,364,000
26	China	1,388,233,000	51.7%	717,310,000
27	Japan	126,045,000	50.1%	63,089,000
28	Turkey	80,418,000	49.8%	40,010,000
29	Argentina	44,272,000	48.2%	21,329,000
30	Mexico	130,223,000	40.7%	52,993,000
31	Thailand	68,298,000	40.5%	27,628,000
32	Kazakhstan	18,064,000	39.2%	7,078,000
33	Brazil	211,243,000	37.7%	79,578,000
34	Iran	80,946,000	37.1%	30,000,000
35	Venezuela	31,926,000	36.2%	11,559,000
36	South Africa	55,436,000	36.2%	20,089,000
37	Peru	32,166,000	36.0%	11,585,000
38	Colombia	49,068,000	35.4%	17,361,000
39	Morocco	35,241,000	33.4%	11,755,000
40	Algeria	41,064,000	32.4%	13,293,000
41	Egypt	95,215,000	30.4%	28,958,000
42	Vietnam	95,415,000	26.4%	25,162,000
43	Ukraine	44,405,000	23.5%	10,448,000
44	Philippines	103,797,000	23.3%	24,173,000
45	India	1,342,513,000	22.3%	300,124,000
46	Indonesia	263,510,000	20.7%	54,494,000
47	Iraq	38,654,000	19.9%	7,709,000
48	Nigeria	191,836,000	14.8%	28,381,000
49	Pakistan	200,814,000	6.7%	13,505,343
50	Bangladesh	164,828,000	5.2%	8,578,000

== 2016 rankings ==
The following list of countries by smartphone penetration was measured by the Pew Research Center survey conducted in 40 nations among 45,435 respondents from March 25 to May 27, 2015.

Rank	Country	% of adults owning a smartphone	Relative size
1	South Korea	88	
2	Australia	77	
3	Israel	74	
4	United States	72	
5	Spain	71	
6	New Zealand	70	
7	United Kingdom	68	
8	Canada	67	
9	Chile	65	
10	Malaysia	65	
11	Germany	60	
12	Italy	60	
13	Turkey	59	
14	China	59	
15	Palestine	57	
16	Lebanon	52	
17	Jordan	51	
18	France	49	
19	Argentina	48	
20	India	45	
21	Russia	45	
22	Brazil	41	
23	Poland	41	
24	Japan	39	
25	South Africa	37	
26	Vietnam	35	
27	Mexico	35	
28	Nigeria	28	
29	Ukraine	27	
30	Kenya	26	
31	Peru	25	
32	Philippines	22	
33	Ghana	21	
34	Indonesia	21	
38	Pakistan	19	
35	Senegal	19	
36	Fiji	17	
37	Burkina Faso	14	
39	Tanzania	11	
40	Ethiopia	4	
41	Uganda	4	

A different research performed by eMarketer indicates that the smartphone penetration in Denmark is 81%.

== 2015 rankings ==
The following list of countries by smartphone penetration was measured by the Pew Research Center survey conducted in 40 nations among 45,435 respondents from March 25 to May 27, 2015.

Rank	Country	% of adults owning a smartphone	Relative size
1	South Korea	88	
2	Australia	77	
3	Israel	74	
4	United States	72	
5	Spain	71	
6	New Zealand	70	
7	United Kingdom	68	
8	Canada	67	
9	Chile	65	
10	Malaysia	65	
11	Germany	60	
12	Italy	60	
13	Turkey	59	
14	China	58	
15	Palestine	57	
16	Lebanon	52	
17	Jordan	51	
18	France	49	
19	Argentina	48	
20	Venezuela	45	
21	Russia	45	
22	Brazil	41	
23	Poland	41	
24	Japan	39	
25	South Africa	37	
26	Vietnam	35	
27	Mexico	35	
28	Nigeria	28	
29	Ukraine	27	
30	Kenya	26	
31	Peru	25	
32	Philippines	22	
33	Ghana	21	
34	Indonesia	21	
35	Senegal	19	
36	India	17	
37	Burkina Faso	14	
38	Pakistan	14	
39	Tanzania	11	
40	Ethiopia	4	
41	Uganda	4	

A different research performed by eMarketer indicates that the smartphone penetration in Denmark is 81%.

== 2013 rankings ==
The following list of the countries by smartphone penetration was measured by Google's Our Mobile Planet in 2013.

Rank	Country/Territory	Penetration
1	United Arab Emirates	73.8%
2	South Korea	73.0%
3	Saudi Arabia	72.8%
4	Singapore	71.7%
5	Norway	67.5%
6	Australia	64.6%
7	Sweden	62.9%
8	Hong Kong	62.8%
9	United Kingdom	62.2%
10	Denmark	59.0%
11	Ireland	57.0%
12	Israel	56.6%
13	Canada	56.4%
14	United States	56.4%
15	Spain	55.4%
16	Switzerland	54.0%
17	New Zealand	53.6%
18	Netherlands	52.0%
19	Taiwan	50.8%
20	Austria	48.0%
21	China	46.9%
22	Slovakia	45.9%
23	Finland	45.5%
24	France	42.3%
25	Czech Republic	41.6%
26	Italy	41.3%
27	Germany	39.8%
28	South Africa	39.8%
29	Philippines	38.7%
30	Mexico	36.8%
31	Russia	36.2%
32	Poland	35.0%
33	Malaysia	34.5%
34	Hungary	34.4%
35	Belgium	33.5%
36	Greece	32.5%
37	Portugal	32.1%
38	Thailand	31.0%
39	Argentina	30.7%
40	Turkey	29.6%
41	Romania	27.9%
42	Brazil	26.3%
43	Japan	24.7%
44	Vietnam	19.7%
45	Indonesia	14.0%
46	Ukraine	14.4%
47	India	12.8%

== See also ==
- List of sovereign states by number of broadband Internet subscriptions
- List of countries by number of Internet users
- List of countries by number of telephone lines in use
- List of mobile network operators
- List of multiple-system operators
- List of telecommunications companies
