= List of countries by number of internet users =

- Internet users per 100 inhabitants Source: International Telecommunication Union. Number of internet users Share of individuals using the internet

Below is a sortable list of countries by number of internet users as of December 2025. Internet users are defined as persons who accessed the internet in the last 3 months from any device, including mobile phones. Percentage is the percentage of a country's population that are internet users. Estimates are calculated by the International Telecommunication Union using aggregate data.

All United Nations member states are included, except North Korea, whose number of internet users is estimated at a few thousand. The data only regards of people who are aged over 19.

== Table ==
The table contains the population percentage that uses the internet; data from the ITU.

Location	Rate (ITU)	Year
World	76.3	2026
Afghanistan	16.1	2024
Albania	85.9	2024
Algeria	77.4	2024
uk	94.4	2024
Angola	40.7	2024
Anguilla	81.6	2016
Antigua and Barbuda	72.7	2024
Argentina	89.7	2024
Armenia	83.4	2024
Aruba	97.2	2017
Ascension	41	2012
Australia	96.1	2024
Austria	91.9	2025
Azerbaijan	90.8	2026
Bahamas	92.5	2024
Bahrain	100	2024
Bangladesh	53.4	2024
Barbados	70.4	2024
Belarus	95.5	2025
Belgium	96.5	2025
Belize	80	2024
Benin	34	2024
Bermuda	98.4	2017
Bhutan	91.3	2024
Bolivia	79.7	2024
Bosnia and Herzegovina	90.1	2025
Botswana	57.5	2024
Brazil	84.9	2025
British Virgin Islands	77.7	2017
Brunei	96.3	2024
Bulgaria	79.7	2025
Burkina Faso	28.3	2024
Burundi	8.6	2024
Cape Verde	74.7	2024
Cambodia	68.5	2024
Cameroon	46.3	2024
Canada	94.4	2024
Cayman Islands	81.1	2017
Central African Republic	13.8	2024
Chad	12.6	2024
Chile	95.6	2024
China	91.8	2025
Colombia	79.3	2024
Comoros	32.5	2024
Congo	47.3	2024
Cook Islands	54	2016
Costa Rica	90	2025
Croatia	85.9	2025
Cuba	70.5	2024
Curacao	68.1	2017
Cyprus	89.6	2024
Czech Republic	88.5	2025
DR Congo	19.7	2024
Denmark	99.8	2024
Djibouti	65.3	2024
Dominica	82	2024
Dominican Republic	91	2024
East Timor	35	2021
Ecuador	80.1	2025
Egypt	74.6	2024
El Salvador	82.2	2025
Equatorial Guinea	63.3	2024
Eritrea	14.3	2020
Estonia	92.2	2024
Eswatini	63.4	2024
Ethiopia	21.4	2024
Falkland Islands	99	2016
Faroe Islands	97.6	2017
Fiji	74.7	2024
Finland	94.1	2025
France	89.6	2025
French Guiana	25.7	2009
French Polynesia	72.7	2017
Gabon	68.7	2024
Gambia	49.5	2024
Georgia	83.8	2024
Germany	94.6	2025
Ghana	72.2	2024
Gibraltar	94.4	2016
Greece	89.2	2025
Greenland	69.5	2017
Grenada	70.2	2024
Guam	80.5	2017
Guatemala	60.2	2024
Guernsey	83.6	2011
Guinea	33.3	2024
Guinea-Bissau	29.8	2024
Guyana	83	2024
Haiti	47.9	2024
Honduras	58.6	2024
Hong Kong	95.8	2024
Hungary	92.8	2025
Iceland	98.2	2024
India	70	2025
Indonesia	77.6	2025
Iran	85.3	2024
Iraq	81.5	2024
Ireland	97.2	2024
Israel	88.2	2024
Italy	90.3	2025
Ivory Coast	41.4	2024
Jamaica	90.1	2024
Japan	85.5	2024
Jersey	41	2012
Jordan	95.6	2024
Kazakhstan	93.4	2024
Kenya	35	2024
Kiribati	89.4	2024
Kosovo	89.4	2018
Kuwait	100	2025
Kyrgyzstan	92	2024
Laos	65.6	2024
Latvia	94.4	2025
Lebanon	80.6	2024
Lesotho	51.8	2024
Liberia	32.2	2024
Libya	82	2024
Liechtenstein	98.3	2024
Lithuania	89.2	2024
Luxembourg	99.1	2025
Macao	89.8	2024
Madagascar	18.7	2024
Malawi	19	2024
Malaysia	98.3	2025
Maldives	85.2	2024
Mali	36.8	2024
Malta	93.9	2024
Marshall Islands	65.9	2024
Mauritania	45.8	2024
Mauritius	73.3	2024
Mexico	83.1	2024
Micronesia	39.5	2024
Moldova	77.4	2024
Monaco	99	2024
Mongolia	85.1	2024
Montenegro	94.1	2025
Montserrat	54.6	2011
Morocco	91.2	2024
Mozambique	20.5	2024
Myanmar	45.4	2020
Namibia	64.9	2024
Nauru	83	2024
Nepal	94.2	2026
Netherlands	97	2024
New Caledonia	82	2017
New Zealand	93.5	2024
Nicaragua	61.4	2024
Niger	39.5	2025
Nigeria	41.2	2024
Niue	79.6	2011
North Korea	0	2004
North Macedonia	93.1	2025
Norway	99	2024
Oman	95.3	2024
Pakistan	57.3	2024
Palau	83.9	2024
Palestine	86.6	2023
Panama	72.8	2024
Papua New Guinea	18.8	2024
Paraguay	85.4	2025
Peru	82	2024
Philippines	67.3	2024
Poland	89.7	2025
Portugal	89.5	2025
Puerto Rico	87.3	2022
Qatar	98.1	2024
Réunion	36.3	2009
Romania	93.2	2025
Russia	95.6	2025
Rwanda	31.7	2024
Saint Helena	37.6	2012
Saint Kitts and Nevis	76.9	2024
Saint Lucia	68.2	2024
Saint Vincent & Grenadines	76.2	2024
Samoa	21.2	2014
San Marino	97.4	2024
Sao Tome and Principe	59.1	2024
Saudi Arabia	100	2026
Senegal	60.1	2024
Serbia	90	2025
Seychelles	87.8	2024
Sierra Leone	25.1	2024
Singapore	97.4	2025
Slovakia	89.8	2024
Slovenia	91.6	2025
Solomon Islands	29	2024
Somalia	27.9	2024
South Africa	78.4	2024
South Korea	96.1	2025
South Sudan	6.67	2019
Spain	96.3	2025
Sri Lanka	54.6	2024
Sudan	18.6	2017
Suriname	87.4	2023
Sweden	95.8	2025
Switzerland	97.3	2025
Syria	49.2	2022
Taiwan	97.3	2025
Tajikistan	55.8	2024
Tanzania	31.2	2024
Thailand	92.3	2025
Togo	39.5	2024
Tokelau	1.5	2003
Tonga	67.4	2024
Trinidad and Tobago	82.2	2024
Tunisia	77.7	2025
Turkey	89.8	2025
Turkmenistan	17	2016
Tuvalu	35.2	2017
Uganda	8.95	2024
Ukraine	82.5	2024
United Arab Emirates	100	2025
United Kingdom	95.5	2024
United States	94.7	2024
Uruguay	92	2024
US Virgin Islands	64.4	2017
Uzbekistan	89.5	2024
Vanuatu	22.4	2015
Vatican City	89.2	2024
Venezuela	76.7	2024
Vietnam	87.1	2025
Wallis and Futuna	8.95	2012
Yemen	17.5	2019
Zambia	29.7	2025
Zimbabwe	41.6	2024

== See also ==
- Global digital divide
- National broadband plan
- Internet in North Korea
- List of social networking services
- List of countries by internet connection speeds
- List of sovereign states by number of broadband internet subscriptions
- List of countries by number of telephone lines in use
- List of countries by smartphone penetration
- List of mobile network operators
- List of multiple-system operators
- List of telecommunications companies
