= International rankings of South Korea =

The following are international rankings of South Korea.

== Outline ==
Name	Classification		Reference
FTSE	Developed market	✓	
FTSE	Emerging market		
FTSE	Frontier market		

Name	Classification		Reference
S&P	Developed market	✓	
S&P	Emerging market		
S&P	Frontier market		

Name	Classification		Reference
IMF	Advanced economy	✓	
IMF	Emerging and Developing Economies		

Name	Classification		Reference
DAC	Member	✓	
DAC	Non-member		

Name	Classification		Reference
Paris Club	Member	✓	
Paris Club	Non-member		

Name	Classification		Reference
World Bank	High income	✓	
World Bank	Middle income		
World Bank	Low income		

== Economy ==
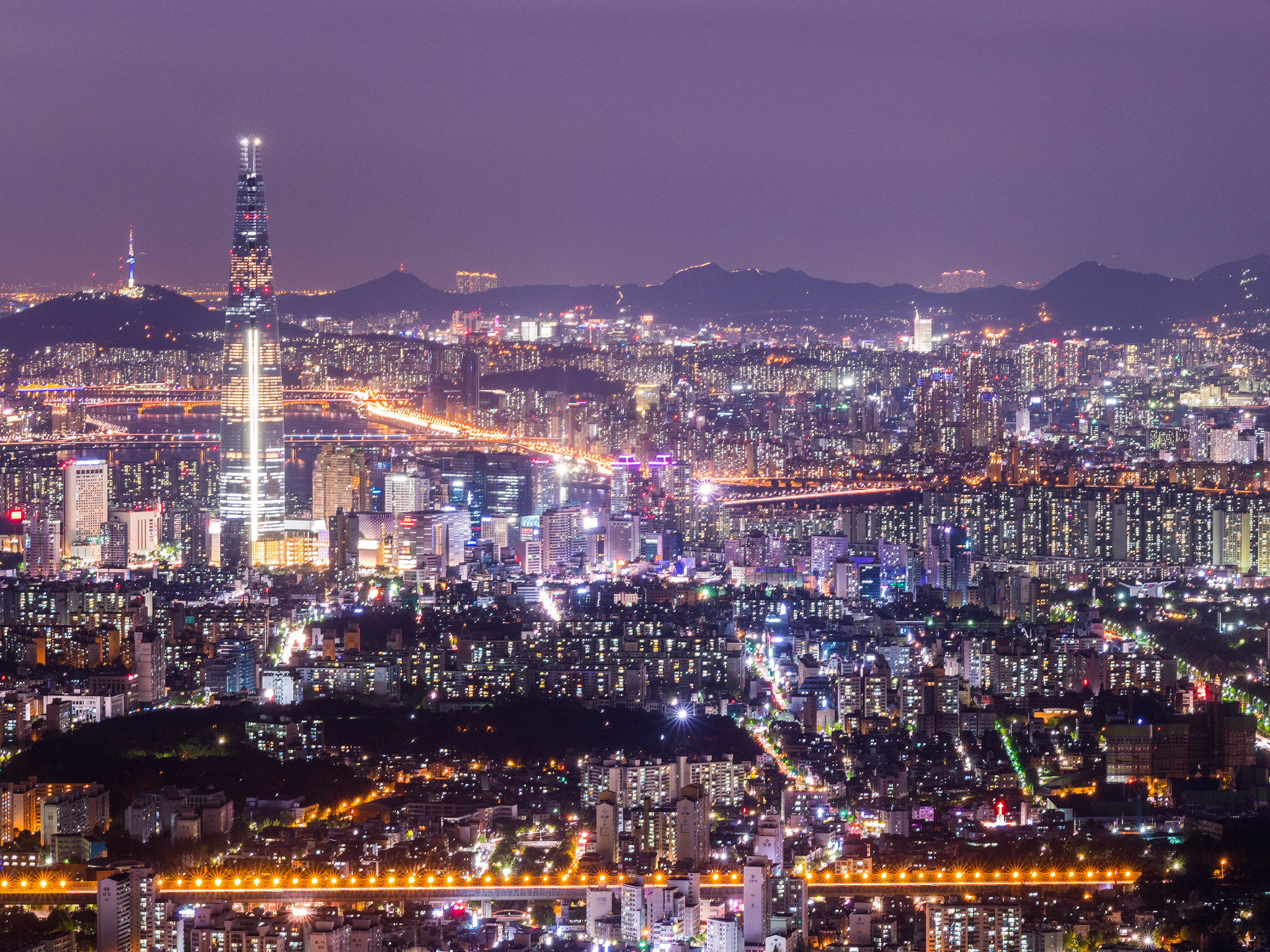
Seoul ranks fifth in global city GDP and second in Asian city GDP.

Economic Rankings
Name	Year	Place	Out of #	Reference
OECD – Net take-home pay, single with no child	2013	3	34	
OECD – Net take-home pay, married with 2 children	2013	8	34	
ILO – Average monthly earnings	2009	10	72	
Gallup – Median household income	2013	8	131	
Gallup – Median per-capita income	2013	15	131	
World Bank – Ease of Doing Business Index	2016	4	183	
The World Factbook – Exports	2014	5	194	
The World Factbook – Imports	2014	7	194	
IMF – GDP (Nominal)	2016	11	179	
IMF – GDP (PPP)	2016	13	180	
IMF – GDP per capita (Nominal)	2014	29	180	
IMF – GDP per capita (PPP)	2014	30	181	
IMF – Foreign exchange reserves	2015	6	98	
World Economic Forum – Financial Development Index	2012	15	62	
World Economic Forum – Global Competitiveness Report	2019	13	141	
World Economic Forum – Global Enabling Trade Report	2014	30	138	
IMD – World Competitiveness Yearbook	2015	25	60	
Wall Street Journal / The Heritage Foundation – Index of Economic Freedom	2023	14	184	^{[unfit]}
OECD – Job security	2012	4	34	
MIT – Economic Complexity Index	2012	5	124	
Connectivity Scorecard	2012	18	52	
World Bank – Logistics Performance Index	2023	17	139	
World Bank – Paying Taxes	2014	25	189	
Grant Thornton – Global Dynamism Index	2013	14	60	
FedEx Opportunity Index – Business Rank	2008	2	109	
Milken Institute – Capital Access Index	2009	12	122	
DHL – Global Connectedness Index	2014	13	140	
McKinsey – Connectedness Index	2012	20	131	

== Education ==
Education Rankings
Name	Year	Place	Out of #	Reference
OECD – Attained a tertiary education degree, 25- to 34-year-olds %	2011	4	35	
OECD Programme for International Student Assessment – Maths	2012	8	34	
OECD Programme for International Student Assessment – Reading	2012	2	34	
OECD Programme for International Student Assessment – Science	2012	4	34	
Trends in International Mathematics and Science Study – 4th Grade Math	2011	2	52	
Trends in International Mathematics and Science Study – 8th Grade Math	2011	9	52	
Trends in International Mathematics and Science Study – 4th Grade Science	2011	23	52	
Trends in International Mathematics and Science Study – 8th Grade Science	2011	3	52	
Institute for Health Metrics and Evaluation – Women's average years in school	2010	3	206	

== Environment ==
Environmental Rankings
Name	Year	Place	Out of #	Reference
Yale University / Columbia University – Environmental Performance Index South Korea ranked 58th in the 2024 Environmental Performance Index.	2024	58	178	
United Nations University for Environment and Human Security – World Risk Index	2013	62	172	

== Health & Safety ==
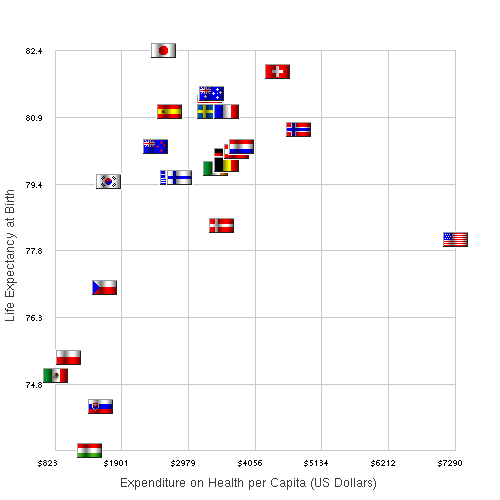
Comparison of healthcare spending and life expectancy for some countries in 2007

Note: In the case of statistics with potentially conflicting meanings, the rankings have been converted to reflect the same direction – Positive statistics rank higher, while negative statistics rank lower.

Health Rankings
Name	Year	Place	Out of #	Reference
WHO – Risk of death from non-communicable disease	2008	9	194	
OECD – Life expectancy	2013	11	34	
WHO – Infant mortality	2005–2010	19	193	
WHO – Health expenditure covered by government	2012	31	34	
OECD – Obesity rate	2009	5	34	
OECD – Hospital beds	2011	2	34	
OECD – Alcohol consumption	2011	13	34	
OECD – Smoking rate	2010	26	41	
OECD – Cancer rate	2012	27	34	
OECD – Colorectal cancer 5-year survival rate	2006–2011	9	23	
OECD – Hemorrhagic stroke 30 day in-hospital mortality	2011	3	32	
OECD – Ischemic stroke 30 day in-hospital mortality	2011	2	33	
Intentional homicide rate	2011	6	192	

== Industry ==
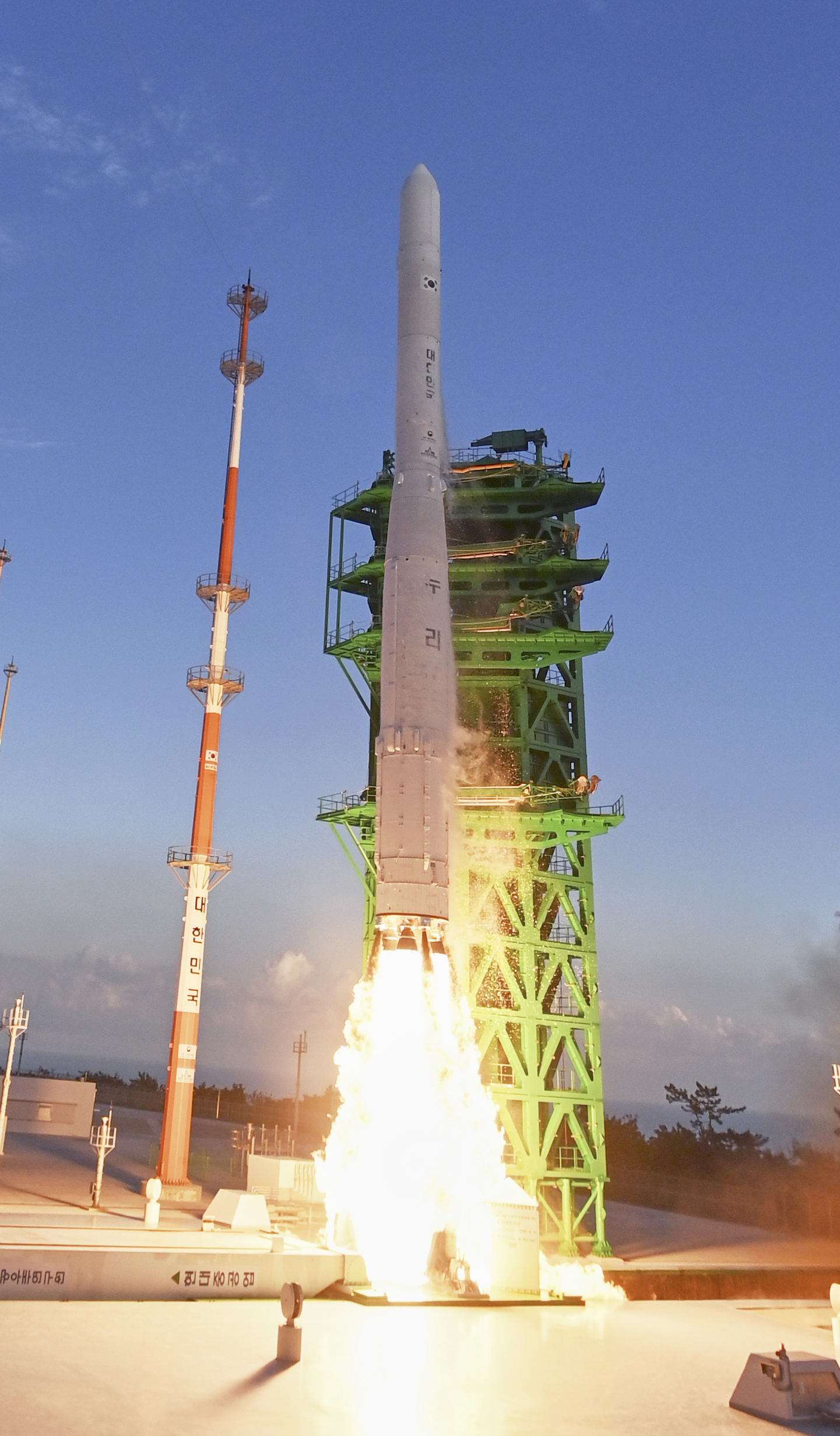
KSLV-II Nuri launching from the Launch Pad 2 at Naro Space Center, 21 October 2021.

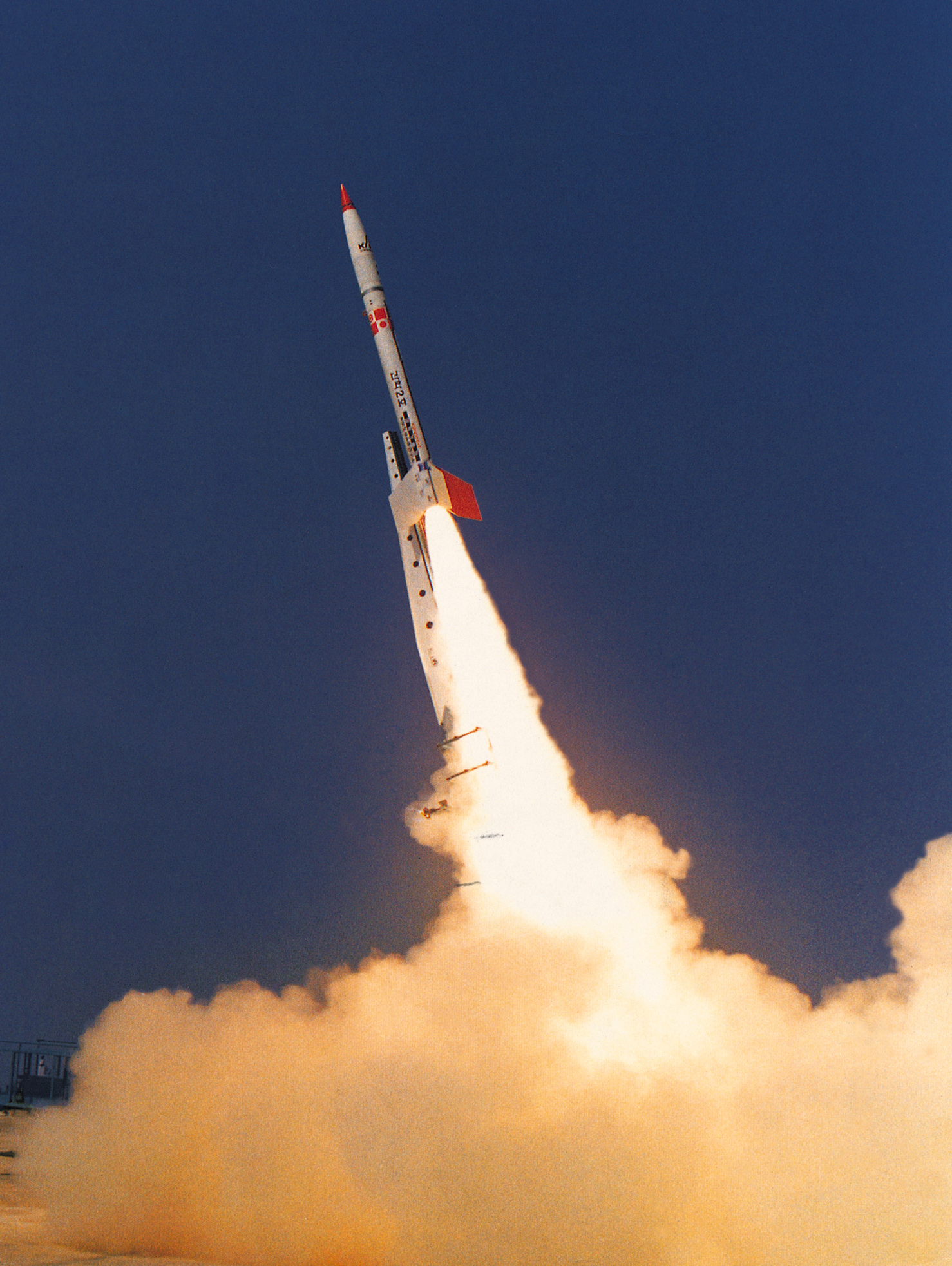
The launch of KARI KSR-1

Industrial Rankings
Name	Year	Place	Out of #	Reference
OICA – Automobile production	2023	5	49	
IAEA – Nuclear energy production	2012	5		
World Steel Association – Steel production	2017	6	40	
The World Factbook – Electricity production	2017	9	211	
Stockholm International Peace Research Institute – Arms exports	2013	13	154	

== Innovation ==
Innovation Rankings
Name	Year	Place	Out of #	Reference
World Intellectual Property Indicators – Patent applications per GDP	2012	8	206	
World Intellectual Property Indicators – Patent applications per million population	2012	6	206	
World Intellectual Property Indicators – Application design counts per million population	2012	8	206	
World Intellectual Property Indicators – Patent grants	2012	4	206	
World Intellectual Property Indicators – Industrial design registrations in force	2012	3	206	
Bloomberg Innovation Index	2016	7	50	Bloomberg Innovation Index
The Boston Consulting Group – International Innovation Index	2009	2	110	
WIPO – Global Innovation Index South Korea ranked 4th out of 139 economies in the 2026 Global Innovation Index.	2026	4	139	
Research and development spending - % of GDP	2012	9	72	
Research and development spending – Total	2011	5	72	

== Politics, Law and Military ==
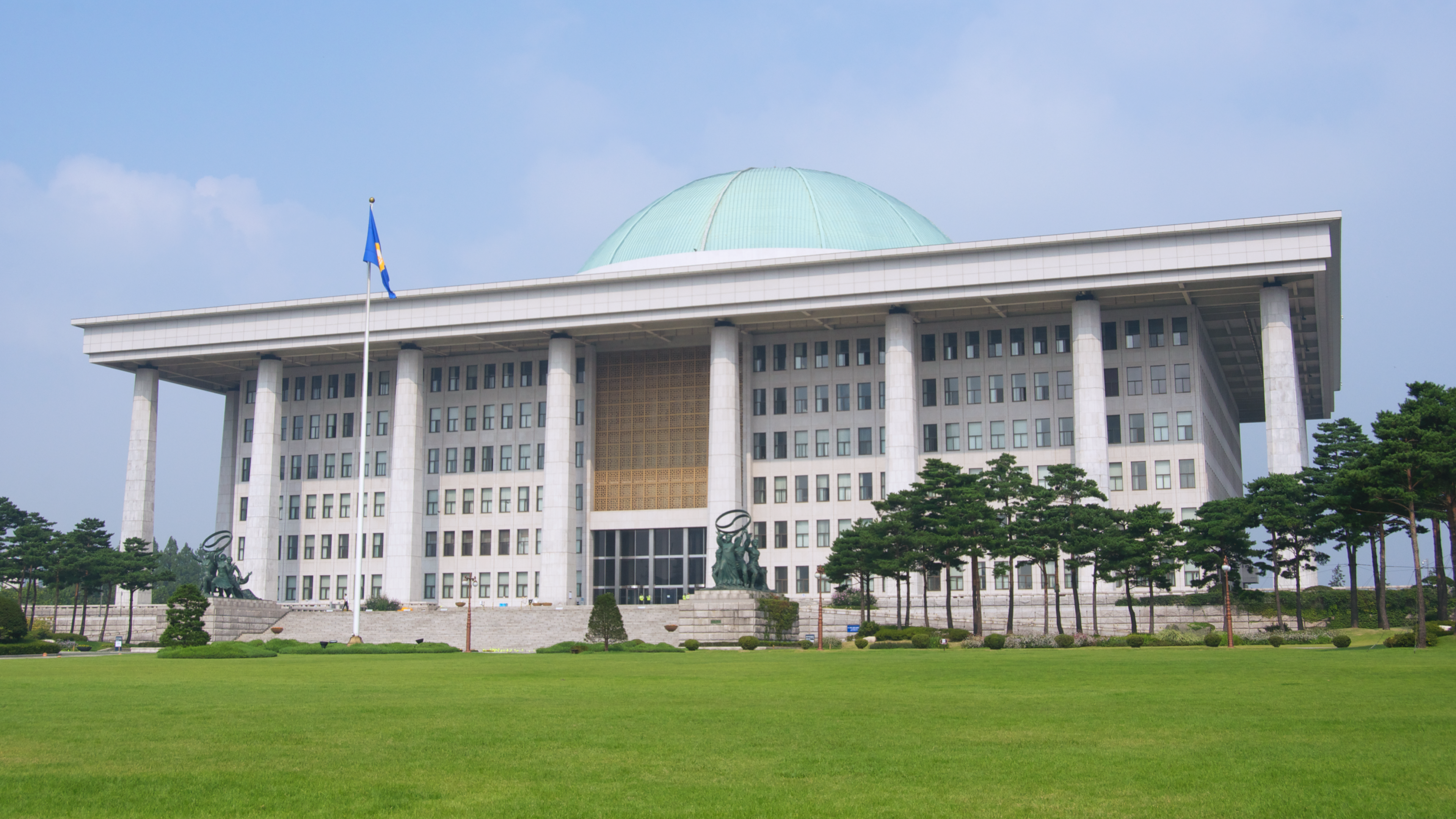
The National Assembly building

The main chamber of the National Assembly

Political, Law and Military Rankings
Name	Year	Place	Out of #	Reference
Transparency International – Global Corruption Barometer	2013	6	95	
OECD – Government transparency	2008	6	34	
Composite Index of National Capability	2007	8	193	
Stockholm International Peace Research Institute – Defense budget	2013	10	154	
World Justice Project – Rule of Law Index	2015	11	102	
Nation brand power	2013	12	40	
Transparency International – Bribe Payers Index	2013	13	28	
The Economist Intelligence Unit – Democracy Index The Economist Intelligence Unit’s Democracy Index 2024 lists South Korea at rank 32 with a score of 7.75.	2024	32	167	
Fund for Peace – Fragile State Index	2013	23	178	
Nation Brand Index	2023	24	49	
Property Rights Alliance – International Property Rights Index	2013	37	130	
Transparency International – Corruption Perception Index	2015	37	177	
Institute for Economics and Peace – Global Peace Index	2015	42	162	
Reporters Without Borders – Press Freedom Index RSF lists South Korea at 47/180 in the 2026 World Press Freedom Index and 61/180 in 2025.	2026	47	180	

== Science & Technology ==
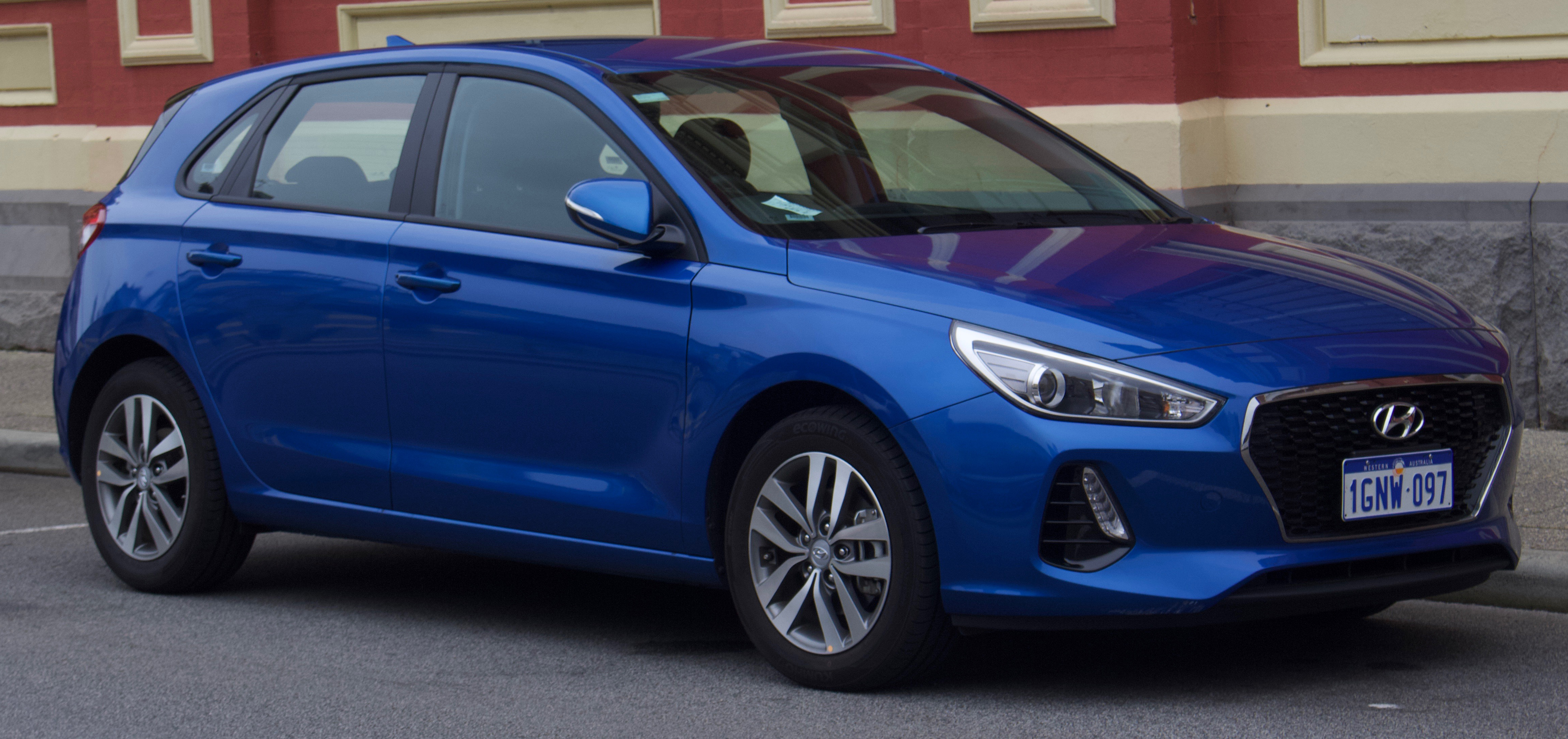
Hyundai Motor Group, one of the top three car brands in the world

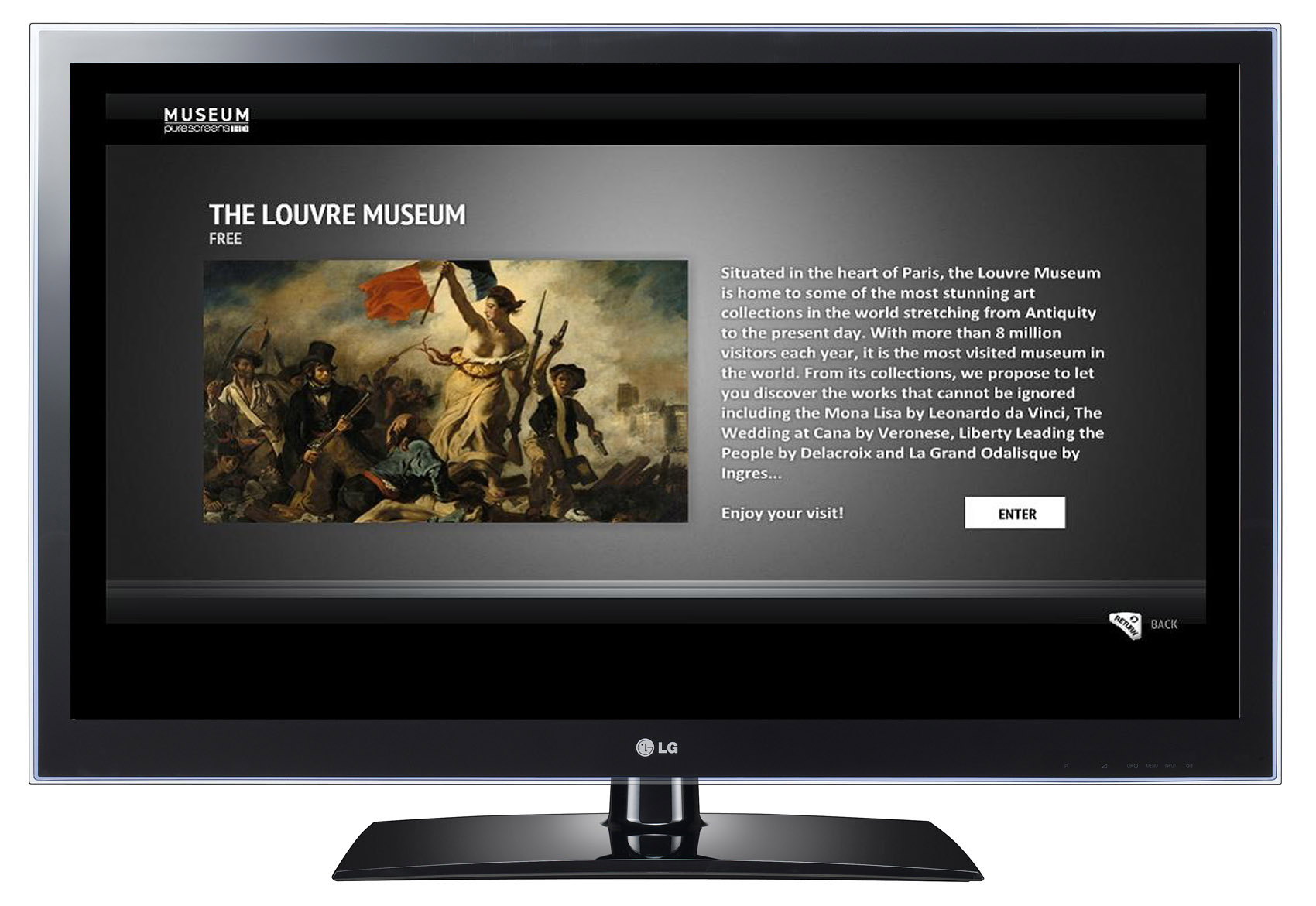
LG Electronics, the No. 1 TV market player in the world

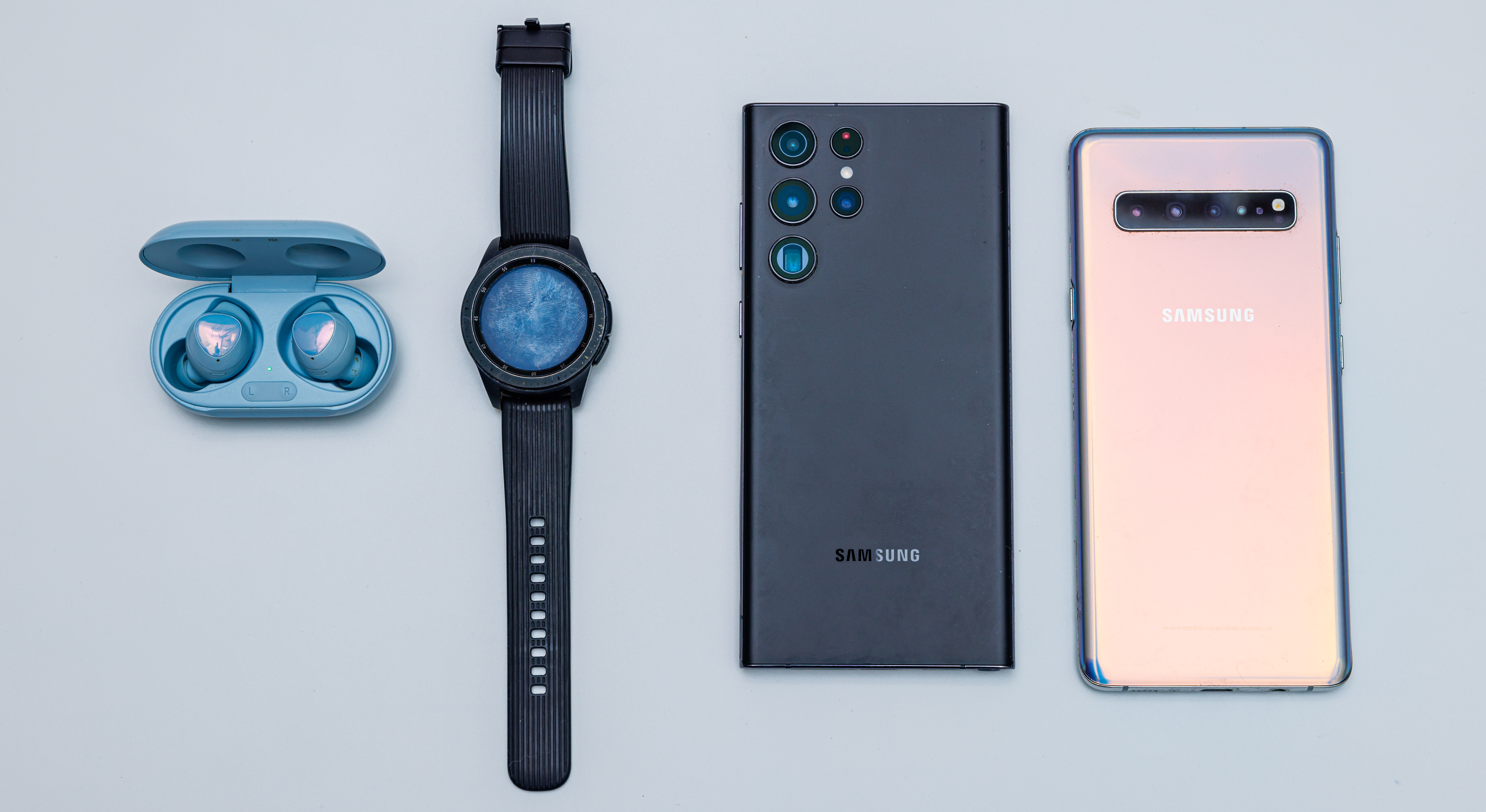
Samsung Electronics, the world's No. 1 smartphone market share as of 2022

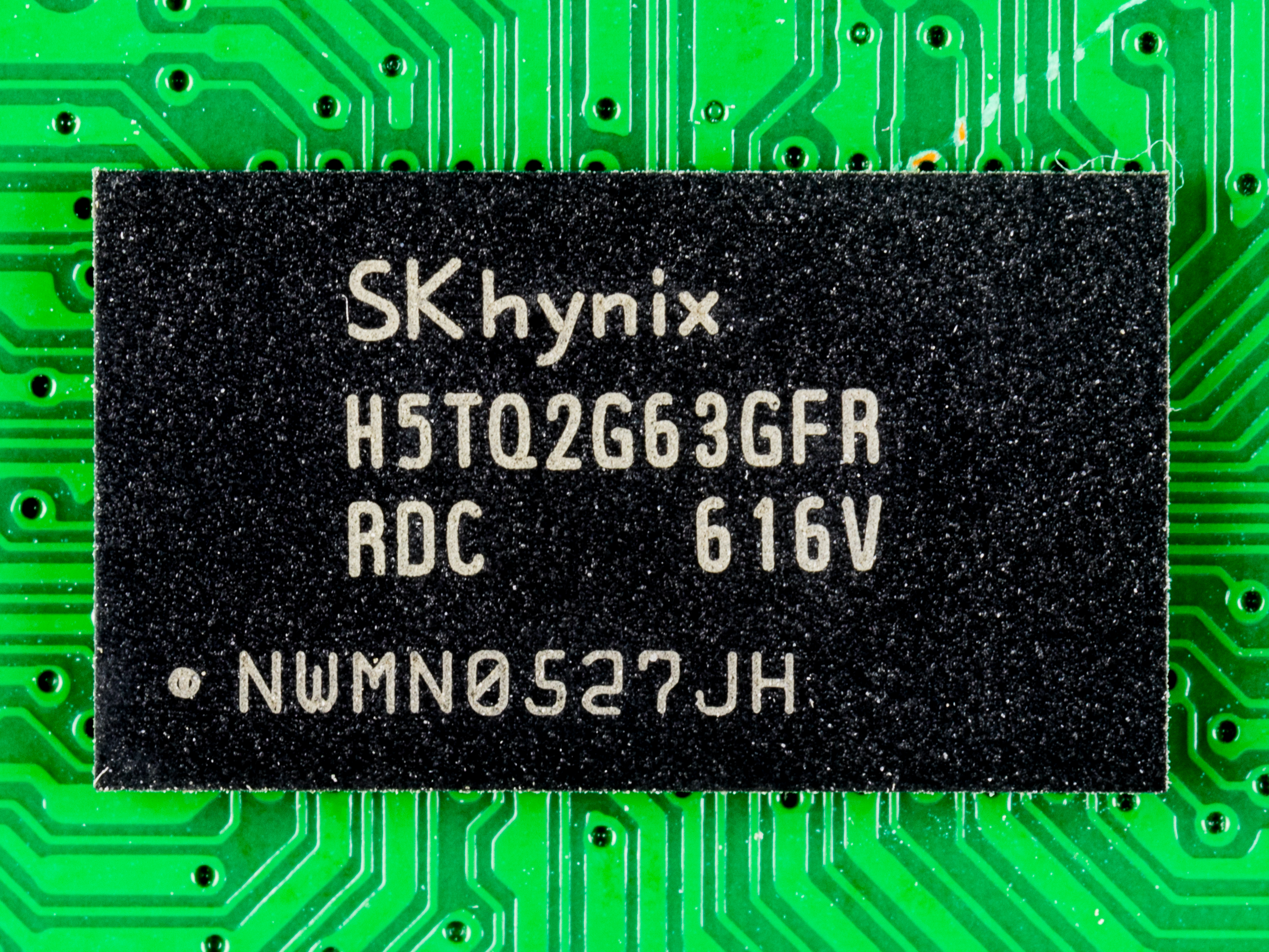
SK Hynix, the world's fourth-largest chipmaker in sales as of 2023

Science & Technology Rankings
Name	Year	Place	Out of #	Reference
Google – Smartphone penetration	2018	4	48	
ClinicalTrials.gov – Stem cell research trials	2014	3	11	
Space Competitiveness Index	2024	7	15	
World Wide Web Foundation – Web index	2014	8	81	
World Economic Forum – Networked Readiness Index	2014	10	145	
United Nations – E-Government Development Index	2022	3	193	
United Nations – E-Participation Index	2022	9	193	
United Nations – Online Service Index	2022	3	193	

== Society & Quality of Life ==
Social and Quality of Life Rankings
Name	Year	Place	Out of #	Reference
Screen Digest – Average number of movies watched	2013	1		
Fragile States Index	2013	18	178	
United Nations – Human Development Index South Korea ranked 20th in UNDP’s 2025 Human Development Report statistical table, with HDI 0.937.	2012	20	187	
Newsweek – "World's best countries"	2010	15	100	
Official Development Assistance aid sent to developing countries	2012	16	23	
The Economist – Where-to-be-born Index	2013	19	80	
Walk Free Foundation – Global Slavery Index	2013	23	160	
World Economic Forum – Human Capital Report	2013	23	122	
OECD – Time devoted to leisure and personal care	2009	25	34	
Legatum Prosperity Index	2014	25	104	
Center for Global Development – Commitment to Development Index	2013	26	166	
Social Progress Index	2014	28	132	
Save the Children State of the World's Mothers report	2014	30	178	
Average annual hours worked per worker	2012–2013	32	35	
OECD – Social expenditure as % of GDP	2014	32	34	
United Nations – World Happiness Report	2013	41	166	
Charities Aid Foundation – World Giving Index	2012	45	145	

== Tourism ==
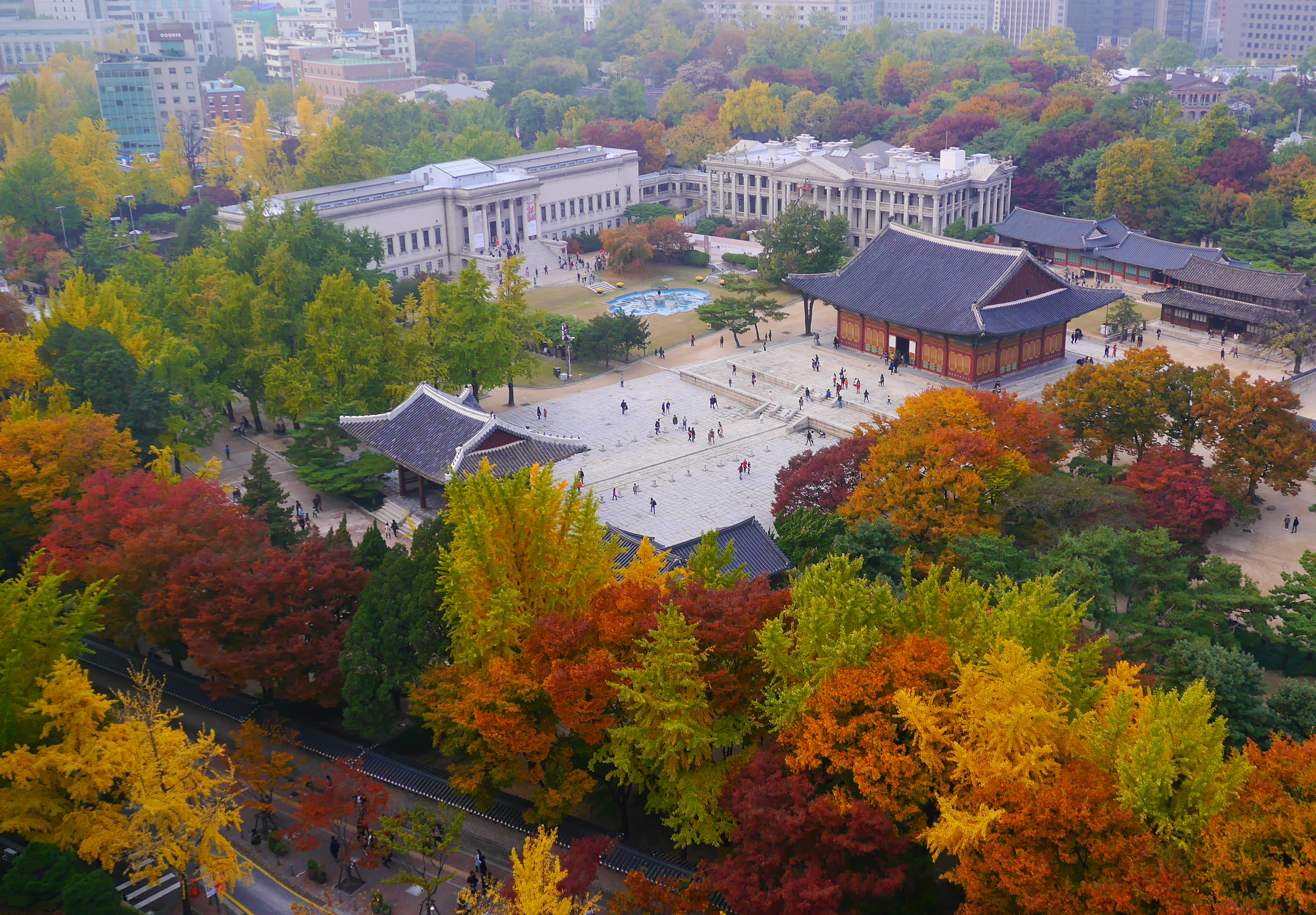
The Deoksugung palace in Seoul, a popular visitor attraction

Tourism Rankings
Name	Year	Place	Out of #	Reference
World Tourism Organization – World Tourism rankings	2013	23	193	
World Economic Forum – Travel and Tourism Competitiveness Report	2013	15	140	
UNESCO – World Heritage Site	2023	22	34	

== Transportation ==
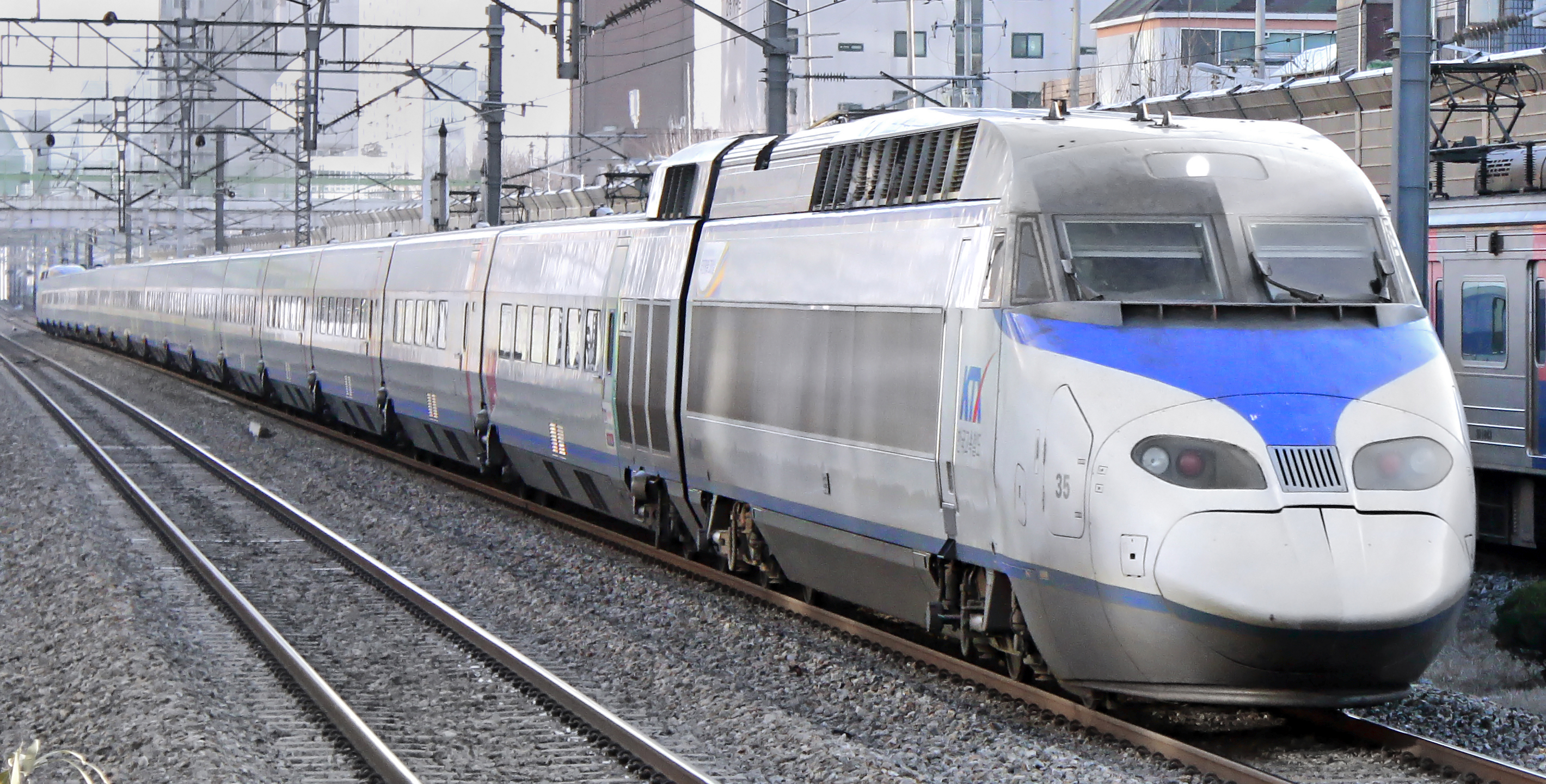
KTX train

Transportation Rankings
Name	Year	Place	Out of #	Reference
The World Factbook – Number of Heliports	2013	2	192	
The World Factbook – Expressway density	2009	8	192	

== Culture ==
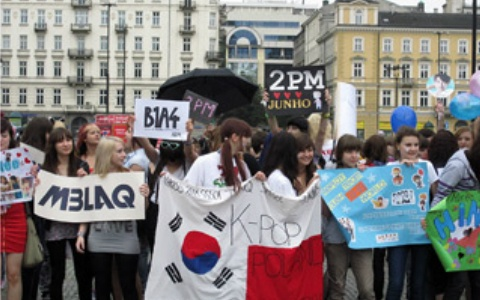
K-pop fans outside the Korean Cultural Center in Warsaw, Poland, in 2011

Culture rankings
Name	Year	Place	Out of #	Reference
Brand Finance – Global Soft Power Index	2023	15	-	

== See also ==
- International rankings of North Korea
- International rankings of China
- International rankings of Japan
