= International rankings of Taiwan =

The following are the international rankings of Taiwan.

== Demographics ==
Item		Year	Ranking	Out of	Source
Birth rate	8.3 (per 1,000 population)	2017	219	226	
Death rate	7.4 (per 1,000 population)	2017	113	226	
Fertility rate	1.13 (per 1,000 population)	2017	222	224	
Life expectancy	80.20	2017	40	224	
Net migration rate	0.9 (per 1,000 population)	2017	58	221	
Population	23,508,428	2017	55	238	
Population density	653.37 (per square kilometer)	2017	18	241	
Population growth rate	0.17%	2017	186	234	
Infant Mortality Rate	4.3 (per 1,000 births)	2017	185	223	
Literacy	98.5%	2017	37	162	

== Economy ==
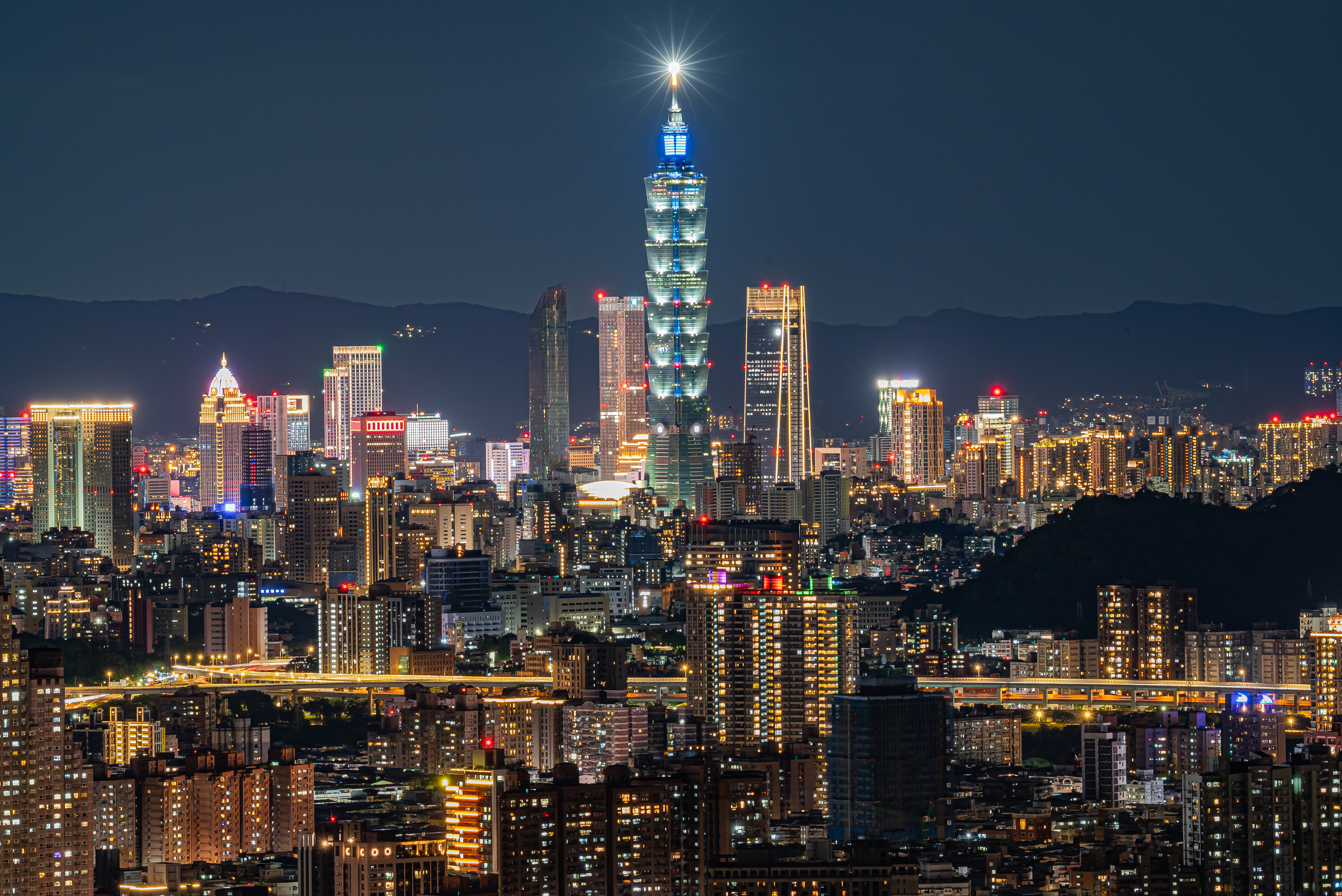
Night skyline of Taipei

Item		Year	Ranking	Out of	Source
Income equality (Gini index)	33.6	2014	111	175	
Industrial growth rate	2.00%	2017	127	203	
Labor force	11,640,000	2017	50	233	
Unemployment rate	3.8%	2017	47	217	
Index of Economic Freedom	80.7	2023	4	177	
The Global Competitiveness Index		2017–18	15	137	

=== GDP ===
Item		Year	Ranking	Out of	Source
GDP (nominal)	814.438 (billion USD)	2025	21	191	
GDP (nominal) Per capita	33,234 (USD)	2024	34	191	
GDP (PPP)	1840 (billion USD)	2024	21	191	
GDP (PPP) Per capita	79,031 (USD)	2024	11	191	
GDP (real) growth rate	2.8%	2017	129	226	

- GDP sector composition in 2017
  - Agriculture: 1.8%
  - Industry: 36%
  - Services: 62.1%

=== Finance ===
Item		Year	Ranking	Out of	Source
Account balance	80,110,000,000 (USD)	2017	6	202	
Central bank interest rate	1.38%	2016	127	161	
Commercial bank prime lending rate	2.7%	2017	175	189	
External Debt	$204,700,000,000	2017	37	208	
Public Debt	35.20% of GDP	2017	150	210	
Gross fixed investment	21.70% of GDP	2010	94	185	
Foreign direct investment	$85,580,000,000	2017	48	134	
FDI abroad	$367,200,000,000	2017	21	118	
Foreign exchange reserves	$468,100,000,000	2017	6	177	
Government budget					
Inflation rate	0.6%	2017	28	227	
Market value of publicly traded shares	$851,200,000,000	2016	14	123	
Stock of Domestic credit	$835,800,000,000	2017	18	193	
Stock of Quasi money	$618,000,000,000	2008	9	164	

=== Trade & Quality of Living ===
Index		Year	Rank	Out of	Source
Exports	$344,600,000,000	2017	15	225	
Imports	$272,600,000,000	2017	20	223	
Cost of Living Survey	Taipei	2017	27	209	
Nation Brands Index		2024	29	50	

== Energy ==
=== Electricity ===
Index		Year	Rank	Out of	Source
Consumption	255,300,000,000(KWH)	2016	15	220	
Production	264,100,000,000(KWH)	2016	18	221	

=== Greenhouse Gas Emissions ===
Index	Year	Rank	Out of	Source
Change (with land use)	2000	52	185	
Change (without land use)	2005	26	185	

=== Natural gas ===
Index		Year	Rank	Out of	Source
Consumption	19,730,000,000(cu m)	2015	37	216	
Imports	19,390,000,000(cu m)	2015	17	216	
Production	310,000,000 (cu m)	2015	76	217	
Reserves	6,229,000,000(cu m)	2017	91	212	

=== Oil ===
Index		Year	Rank	Out of	Source
Consumption	955,300(bbl/day)	2015	23	215	
Exports	0 (bbl/day)	2016	N/A	216	
Imports	858,700(bbl/day)	2016	14	216	
Production	196(bbl/day)	2016	96	217	
Reserves	2,380,000(bbl)	2017	98	217	

=== Renewable Energy ===
Index	Year	Rank	Out of	Source
Utilization of wind power	2009	25	29	

== Geography ==
Index		Year	Rank	Out of	Source
Total Area	35,980(km^{2})	N/A	139	254	
Coastline length	1,566.3 km	N/A	66	239	
Population of urban areas	Taipei 8,605,000 Taichung 2,595,000 Kaohsiung 2,555,000 Tainan 1,195,000 Hsinchu 550,000	2018	43 198 205 439 976	1064	
Land Area of urban areas	Taipei 1,140 (km^{2}) Taichung 492 (km^{2}) Kaohsiung 363 (km^{2}) Tainan 259 (km^{2}) Hsinchu 117(km^{2})	2018	108 265 333 429 800	1064	
Urban Population Density	Taipei 7,600 (per km^{2}) Kaohsiung 7,000 (per km^{2}) Taichung 5,300 (per km^{2}) Hsinchu 4,700 (per km^{2}) Tainan 4,600 (per km^{2})	2018	322 350 527 611 624	1064	
Global Power City Index	Taipei 876.3/1800	2016	36	44	
Environmental Performance Index	72.84	2018	23	180	

== Health ==
- Health expenditure per capita in 2006: ranked 32 out of 194 countries.
- Infant mortality rate in 2011: 4.3 per 1000 births; ranked 187 out 225 countries.

== Crime ==
According to OSAC 2016 safety report Overall Crime and Safety Situation was classifies as low criminality.

== Industry ==
Item	Statistics	Year	Ranking	out of	Source
Steel production	23.2 million metric tons	2017	11	42	
Motor vehicle production	291,563	2017	29	52	
Cement production		2005	42	94	
Shipbuilding total completed ships		2005	6	10	

== Mass media ==
Item / Index	Statistics	Year	Rank	Out of	Source
Academy Awards for Best Foreign Language Film	Number of winning films 1 Number of nominated films 3 Number of submitted films 43	2017	21	124	
Books published	28,084	2010	15	127	
Number of mobile phones in use	28,610,000	2013	36	73	
Number of mobile phones in use/ 100 citizen	123.33	2013	32	73	
E-readiness / Digital economy rankings	7.99	2010	12	70	
Broadband (Fixed-broadband subscriptions)	5,713,568 subscriptions per 100 inhabitants: 24	2017	26	197	
Broadband (Mobile-cellular subscriptions)	10,715,720	2014	25	193	
Internet Hosts	6,272,000	2012	18	233	
Television broadcast stations	76 (46 digital and 30 analog)	2007	34	232	
Networked Readiness Index	5.30	2011	6	138	

== Military ==
Item	Statistics	Year	Rank	Out of	Source
Active troops	215,000	2018	21	172	
Active troops per 1,000	9.1	2018	17	172	
Total military troops	1,657,000	2018	9	172	
Total military troops per 1,000	80.1	2018	5	172	
Military expenditures	10,549 million USD	2017	20	149	
As a percentage of GDP	1.8%	2017	55	149	
Military Expenditures per capita	424 dollars	2016	25	145	
Military Expenditures Share of Government Spending	10.70%	2016	20	148	
Military Strength	0.3765	2017	18	133	
Global Buyers of US Arms	757 million USD	2015–16	8	80	

== Politics ==
Index	Organization	Year	Rank	Out of	Source
Bribe Payers Index	Transparency International	2011	19	28	
Corruption Perceptions Index	Transparency International	2016	31	176	
Democracy Index	Economist Intelligence Unit	2017	33	167	
Ease of Doing Business Index	World Bank	2018	15	190	
Economic Freedom Index	Fraser Institute	2017	21	159	
Economic Freedom Index	The Heritage Foundation	2018	13	180	
Global Competitiveness Report	World Economic Forum	2017–2018	15	137	
Global Peace Index	Institute for Economics and Peace	2018	34	163	
Press Freedom Index	Reporters Without Borders	2018	42	180	
Property Rights Index	Property Rights Alliance	2014	23	97	

== Quality of life ==
Index	Organization	Year	Rank	Out of	Source
Happy Planet Index	New Economics Foundation	2018	26	156	
Human Development Index	United Nations Development Programme	2015	27†	188	2015 Human Development Report National Statistics of Taiwan
Legatum Prosperity Index	Legatum Institute	2015	21	142	
Where-to-be-born Index	Economist Intelligence Unit	2013	14	80	
Satisfaction with Life Index	University of Leicester	2006	68	178	
Global Entrepreneurship Index, GEI	Global Entrepreneurship and development InstituteI	2018	18	137	
World Giving Index	Charity Aids Foundation	2017	52	139	

† if ranked

== Education ==
Index	Organization	Year	Rank	Out of	Source
English Proficiency Index	English First	2018	48	88	

== Sport ==
As Taiwan

Item	Statistics	Year	Ranking	Out of	Source
Asian Games Medals	Gold 17 Silver 19 Bronze 31	2018	7	37	
Asian Games Medals	Gold 10 Silver 18 Bronze 23	2014	9	37	
Asian Games Medals	Gold 13 Silver 16 Bronze 38	2010	7	36	
Asian Games Medals	Gold 9 Silver 10 Bronze 27	2006	10	38	
World Chess Rankings Country rank by average rating of top 10 players	1989	2018	131	178	
World Rankings of Countries in Elite Sport	30530 score	August, 2018	37	206	

== Transportation ==
Item	Statistics	Year	Ranking	Out of	Source
Airports by number	37	2013	107	236	
Merchant marines owned	350	2010	49	177	
Pipeline		2007	93	120	
Railways length	1,613.1 km	2014	81	136	
Rapid transit systems		2009	18	50	
Annual passenger rides Taipei Metro	131.1 km	2017	22	165 metro systems	
Annual passenger rides Kaohsiung MRT	42.7 km	2014	121	165 metro systems	
Roadways length	43,365 km	2013	85	223	

== Tourism ==
Item	Statistics	Year	Ranking	Out of	Source
International Tourism Expenditure	17.9 billion USD	2017	19	25	
International Departures	15.7 million people	2017	8	10	
International Tourism Expenditure per capita	760 USD	2017	14	25	
International tourist arrivals in Asian Pacific region	10,740,000 people	2017	12	48	
Tourism competitiveness	4.47 score	2017	30	136	

== Communications ==
Item	Statistics	Year	Ranking	Out of	Source
Telephone - fixed lines	total subscriptions: 13,770,996 subscriptions per 100 inhabitants: 59	July, 2016	16	221	
Telephone - mobile cellular	total: 29,244,328 subscriptions per 100 inhabitants: 43	2017	44	216	
Internet users	total: 20.601 million percent population: 88%	2017	33	228	

== See also ==
- Lists of countries
- Lists by country
- List of international rankings
- International rankings of South Korea
- International rankings of Japan
