= Outline of China =

Country in East Asia

The Flag of China

The National emblem of China

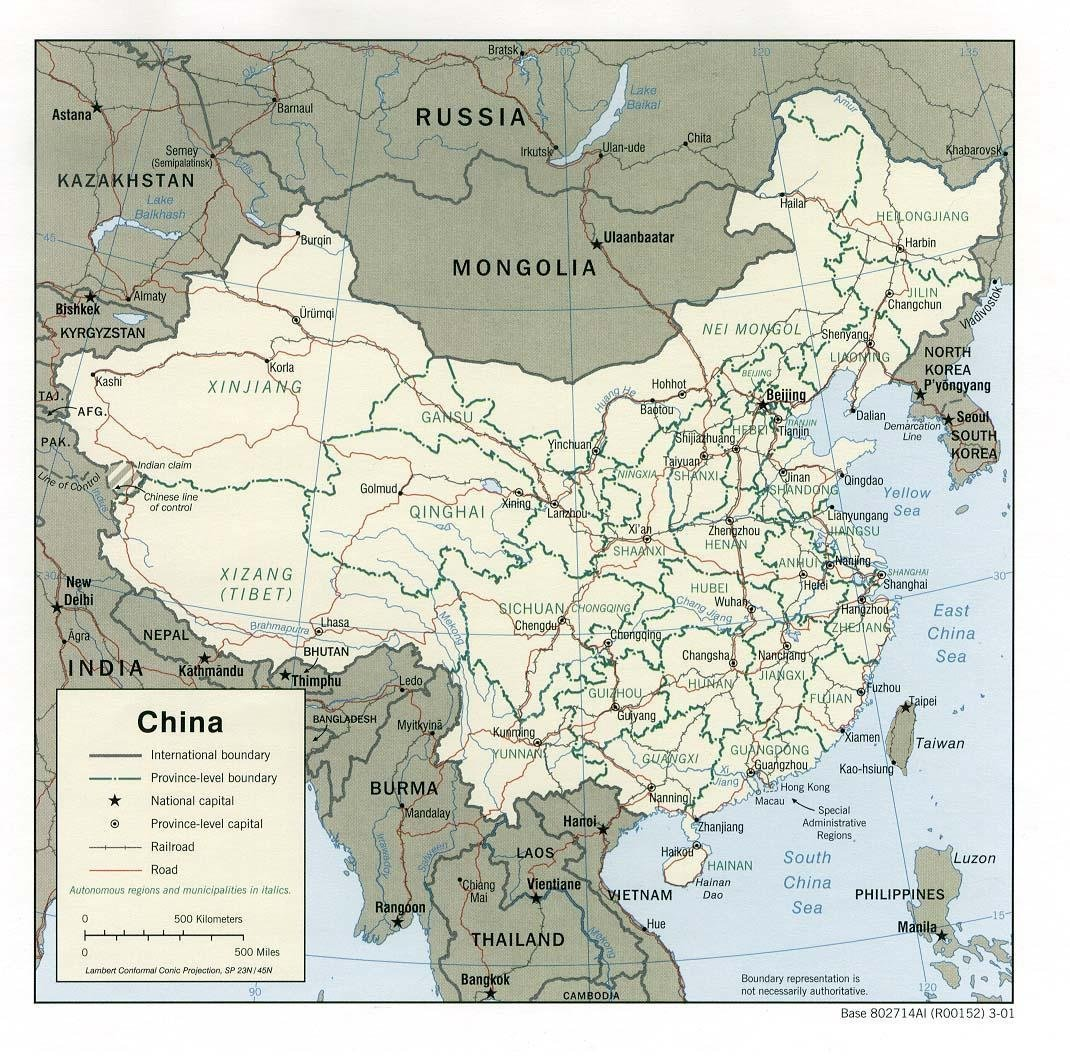
An enlargeable map of the People's Republic of China

The following outline is provided as an overview of and topical guide to China:

The People's Republic of China is the most extensive country in East Asia and the third most extensive country in the world. (Note: Area rank is disputed with the United States and is either ranked third or fourth. See List of countries and dependencies by area for more information.) With a population of over 1,400,000,000, it is the second most populous country in the world.

The Chinese Communist Party (CCP) has led the PRC under a one-party system since the state's establishment in 1949. The PRC is involved in a dispute over the political status of Taiwan. The CCP's rival during the Chinese Civil War, the Kuomintang (KMT), fled to Taiwan and surrounding islands after its defeat in 1949, claiming legitimacy over China, Mongolia, and Tuva while it was the ruling power of the Republic of China (ROC). The term "mainland China" is often used to denote the areas under PRC rule, but sometimes excludes its two special administrative regions: Hong Kong and Macau.

Because of its vast population, rapidly growing economy, and large research and development investments, China is considered an "emerging superpower" or great power. It has the world's second largest economy (largest in terms of purchasing power parity.) China is also a permanent member of the United Nations Security Council and Asia-Pacific Economic Cooperation. Since 1978, China's reform and opening up has brought the poverty rate down from 53% in 1981 to 8% by 2001. However, China is now faced with a number of other socioeconomic problems, including an aging population, an increasing rural-urban income gap, and rapid environmental degradation.

China plays a major role in international trade. The country is the world's largest consumer of steel and concrete, using, respectively, a third and over a half of the world's supply of each. Counting all products, China is the largest exporter and the second largest importer in the world.

== General reference ==
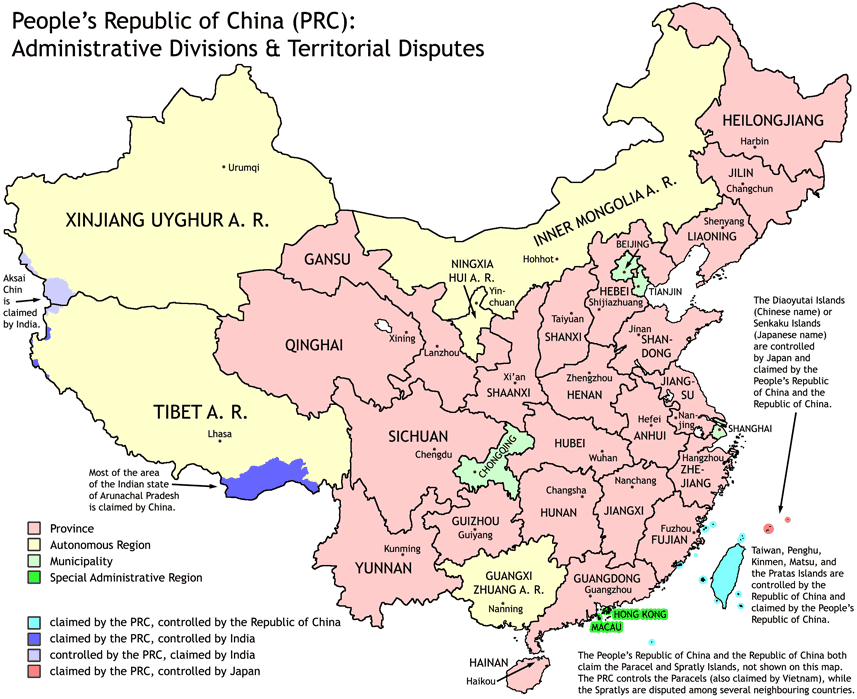
An enlargeable map of the administrative divisions of China

- Pronunciation: /ˈtʃaɪ.nə/
  - Mandarin: [tʂʊŋ˥ kuɔ˧˥]
- Common English country name: China
- Official English country name: The People's Republic of China
- Common endonym: 中国 (Zhōngguó) (The Middle Kingdom or Central Realm)
- Official endonym: 中华人民共和国 (Zhōnghuá Rénmín Gònghéguó)
- Adjectivals: China, Chinese
- Demonym: Chinese
- Etymology: Name of China
- International rankings of China
- ISO country codes: CN, CHN, 156
- ISO region codes: See ISO 3166-2:CN
- Internet country code top-level domain: .cn

== Geography of China ==
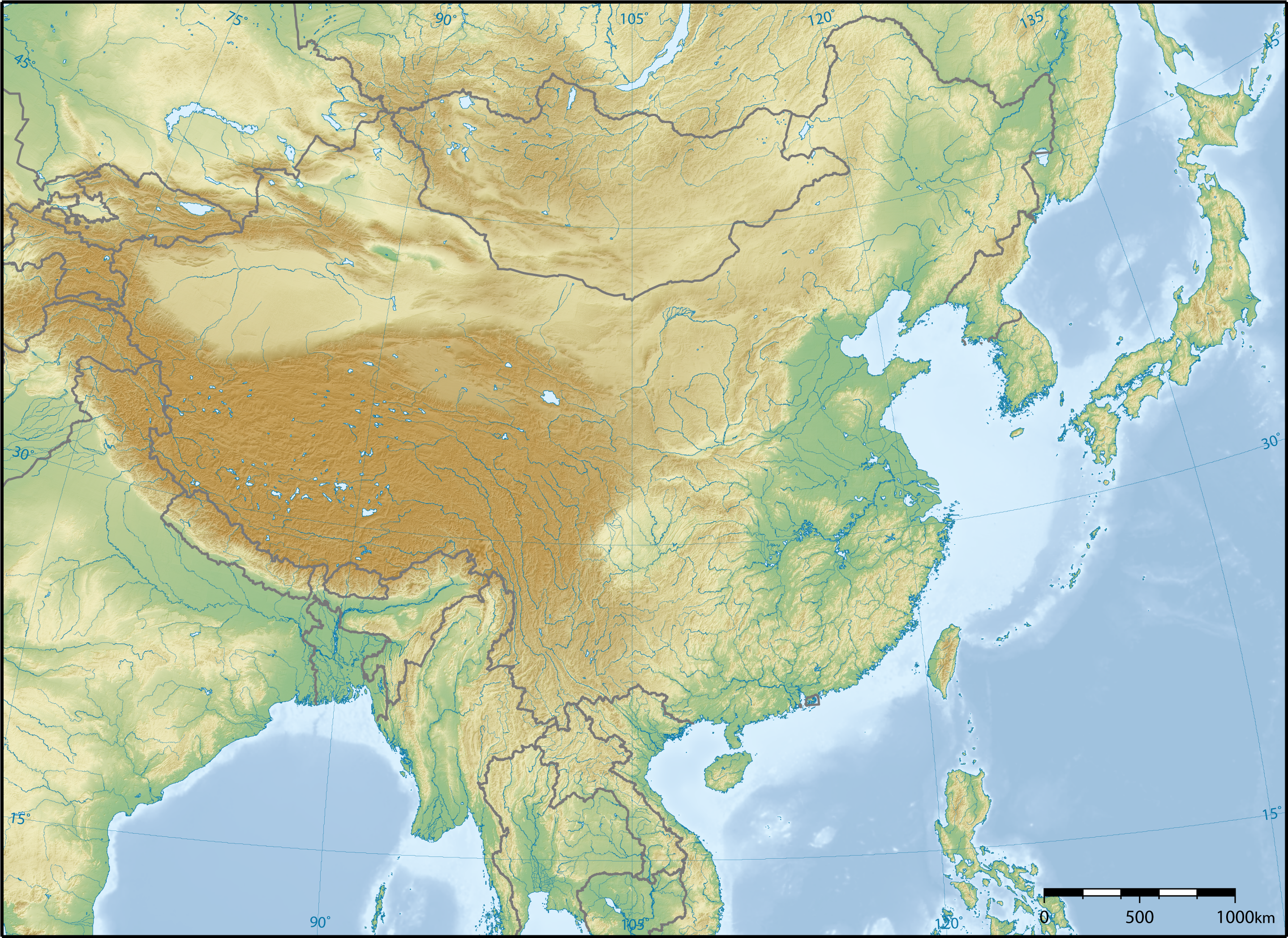
An enlargeable topographic map of China

- China is a megadiverse country
- Location:
  - Northern Hemisphere and Eastern Hemisphere
  - Eurasia
    - Asia
      - East Asia
  - Time zone: China Standard Time (UTC+08)
  - Extreme points of China
    - High: Mount Everest 8,848 m (29,029 ft) – highest point on Earth
    - Low: Turpan Depression −154 m (−505 ft)
  - Land boundaries: 22,117 km (Note: China has the longest total land boundaries of any country.) (Note: China and Russia each border 14 countries, more than any other countries.)

Mongolia 4,677 km
Russia 3,645 km
India (excluding the territorial border disputes; McMahon Line) 3,380 km
Myanmar 2,185 km
Kazakhstan 1,533 km
North Korea 1,416 km
Vietnam 1,281 km
Nepal 1,236 km
Kyrgyzstan 858 km
Pakistan 523 km
Bhutan 470 km
Laos 423 km
Tajikistan 414 km
Afghanistan 76 km

- Coastline: 14,500 km
- Population of China: approximately 1.41 billion (2025 estimate) – the world's second-most populous country, after India.
- Area of China: 9,640,821 square kilometres (3,722,342 sq mi) - 3rd largest country

- Atlas of China

=== Environment of China ===
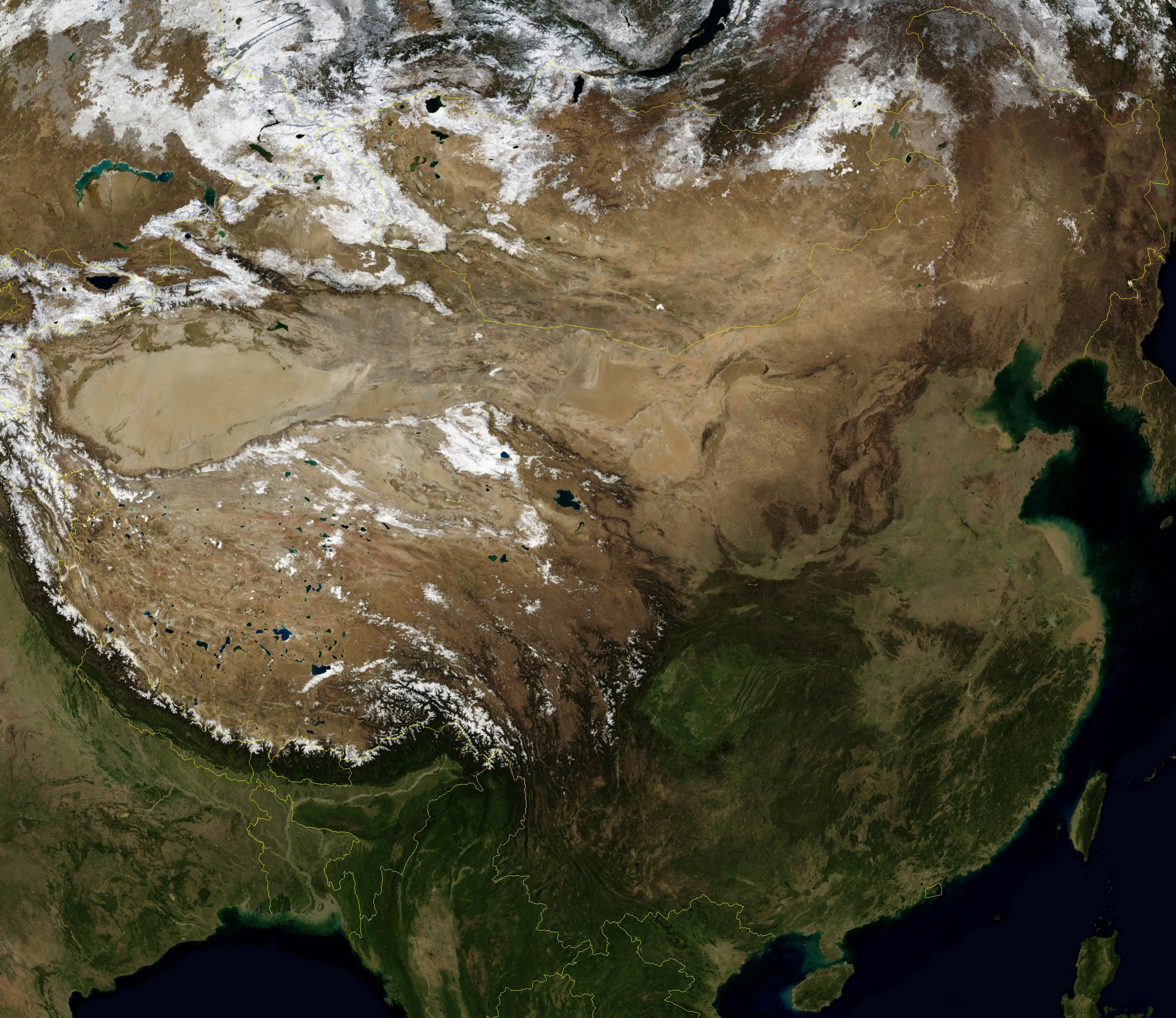
An enlargeable satellite image of China

- Climate of China
  - Climate change in China
- Environmental issues in China
  - Pollution in China
    - Air pollution in China
    - Water pollution in China
- Ecoregions in China
- Renewable energy in China
- Geology of China
  - Earthquakes in China
- Protected areas of China
  - Biosphere reserves in China
  - National parks of China
- Wildlife of China
  - Flora of China
  - Fauna of China
    - Birds of China
    - Mammals of China

==== Natural geographic features of China ====
- Glaciers of China
- Islands of China
- Lakes of China
- Mountains of China
- Rivers of China
- Volcanoes in China
- Waterfalls of China

=== Regions of China ===
==== Administrative divisions of China ====
===== Cities of China =====
- Direct-administered municipalities of China
- Districts of China
- Counties of China
- Villages of China (list)

== Government and politics of China ==
- Form of government: one-party socialist republic.
- Capital of China: Beijing
- Elections in China
- Political parties in China
- Taxation in China
- Democracy in China
  - Democracy movements in China

=== United front ===
- United Front

==== Ruling party ====
- Chinese Communist Party
  - General Secretary (paramount leader): Xi Jinping
  - Politburo (Standing Committee)
  - Secretariat
  - First Secretary: Cai Qi

=== Branches of government ===
==== Ultimate authority and Legislative branch ====
- National People's Congress (unicameral)
  - Standing Committee
    - Chairman: Zhao Leji
  - Head of state (nominal): President, Xi Jinping

==== Administrative branch ====
- Head of government: Premier, Li Qiang
  - State Council, Li's Government

==== Judicial branch ====
- Supreme People's Court
  - President and Chief Justice: Zhang Jun

==== Procuratorial branch ====
- Supreme People's Procuratorate
  - Prosecutor-General: Ying Yong

==== Supervisory branch ====
- Central Commission for Discipline Inspection (National Supervisory Commission)
  - Secretary: Li Xi
  - Director: Liu Jinguo

==== Military branch ====
- Central Military Commission
  - Chairman: Xi Jinping

=== Foreign relations of China ===
- Diplomatic missions in China
- Diplomatic missions of China

==== International organization membership ====
The People's Republic of China is a member of:

- African Development Bank Group (AfDB) (nonregional member)
- African Union/United Nations Hybrid operation in Darfur (UNAMID)
- Arctic Council (observer)
- Asian Development Bank (ADB)
- Asia-Pacific Economic Cooperation (APEC)
- Asia-Pacific Telecommunity (APT)
- Association of Southeast Asian Nations (ASEAN) (dialogue partner)
- Association of Southeast Asian Nations Regional Forum (ARF)
- Bank for International Settlements (BIS)
- Caribbean Development Bank (CDB)
- Central American Integration System (SICA) (observer)
- East Asia Summit (EAS)
- Food and Agriculture Organization (FAO)
- Group of 24 (G24) (observer)
- Group of 77 (G77)
- Group of Twenty Finance Ministers and Central Bank Governors (G20)
- Inter-American Development Bank (IADB)
- International Atomic Energy Agency (IAEA)
- International Bank for Reconstruction and Development (IBRD)
- International Chamber of Commerce (ICC)
- International Civil Aviation Organization (ICAO)
- International Criminal Police Organization (Interpol)
- International Development Association (IDA)
- International Federation of Red Cross and Red Crescent Societies (IFRCS)
- International Finance Corporation (IFC)
- International Fund for Agricultural Development (IFAD)
- International Hydrographic Organization (IHO)
- International Labour Organization (ILO)
- International Maritime Organization (IMO)
- International Mobile Satellite Organization (IMSO)
- International Monetary Fund (IMF)
- International Olympic Committee (IOC)
- International Organization for Migration (IOM)
- International Organization for Standardization (ISO)
- International Red Cross and Red Crescent Movement (ICRM)
- International Telecommunication Union (ITU)
- International Telecommunications Satellite Organization (ITSO)
- International Vaccine Institute (IVI)
- Inter-Parliamentary Union (IPU)
- Latin American Integration Association (LAIA) (observer)
- Multilateral Investment Guarantee Agency (MIGA)
- Nonaligned Movement (NAM) (observer)
- Nuclear Suppliers Group (NSG)
- Organisation for the Prohibition of Chemical Weapons (OPCW)
- Organization of American States (OAS) (observer)
- Pacific Islands Forum (PIF) (partner)
- Permanent Court of Arbitration (PCA)
- Shanghai Cooperation Organisation (SCO)
- South Asian Association for Regional Cooperation (SAARC) (observer)
- United Nations (UN)
- United Nations Conference on Trade and Development (UNCTAD)
- United Nations Educational, Scientific, and Cultural Organization (UNESCO)
- United Nations High Commissioner for Refugees (UNHCR)
- United Nations Industrial Development Organization (UNIDO)
- United Nations Institute for Training and Research (UNITAR)
- United Nations Integrated Mission in Timor-Leste (UNMIT)
- United Nations Interim Force in Lebanon (UNIFIL)
- United Nations Mission for the Referendum in Western Sahara (MINURSO)
- United Nations Mission in Liberia (UNMIL)
- United Nations Mission in the Sudan (UNMIS)
- United Nations Operation in Cote d'Ivoire (UNOCI)
- United Nations Organization Mission in the Democratic Republic of the Congo (MONUC)
- United Nations Security Council (permanent member, since 1971)
- United Nations Truce Supervision Organization (UNTSO)
- Universal Postal Union (UPU)
- World Customs Organization (WCO)
- World Federation of Trade Unions (WFTU)
- World Health Organization (WHO)
- World Intellectual Property Organization (WIPO)
- World Meteorological Organization (WMO)
- World Tourism Organization (UNWTO)
- World Trade Organization (WTO)
- Zangger Committee (ZC)

=== Law and order in China ===
- Capital punishment in China
- Constitution of China
- Crime in China
- Human rights in China
  - Freedom of religion in China
    - Persecution of Christians in China
- Law enforcement in China

=== Military of China ===
- Command
  - Commander-in-chief: Chairman of the Central Military Commission (Note: Article 93 of the Constitution of China places the authority to direct the armed forces of the PRC in the Central Military Commission. However, Article 80 gives the President of China the power to proclaim martial law, proclaim a state of war, and issue mobilization orders. Since the mid-1990s, it has been standard practice to have the President, the CMC Chairman, and the General Secretary of the Chinese Communist Party be the same person although the differences in the start of terms means that there is some overlap between an occupant and his predecessor.)
    - Central Military Commission
- People's Liberation Army
  - Ground Force
    - Ranks of the People's Liberation Army Ground Force
  - Navy
    - Ranks of the People's Liberation Army Navy
  - Air Force
    - Ranks of the People's Liberation Army Air Force
  - Rocket Force
  - Strategic Support Force
- People's Armed Police
- Militia
- Military history of China (pre-1911)

=== Local government in China ===
- Local government in China

== History of China ==
- Bibliographies of the People's Republic of China
- Economic history of China
- Military history of China
- Military history of China before 1912
- List of earthquakes in China

== Culture of China ==
- Architecture of China
- Art in China
- Cinema of China
- Chinese clothing
- Cuisine of China
- Ethnic minorities in China
- Festivals in China
- Languages of China
- Media in China
- National symbols of China
  - Flag of China
  - National emblem of China
  - National anthem of China
- People of China
- Prostitution in China
- Public holidays in China
- Religion in China
  - Buddhism in China
  - Chinese folk religion
  - Christianity in China
  - Hinduism in China
  - Islam in China
  - Judaism in China
  - Taoism in China
- List of World Heritage Sites in China
- Literature of China
- Music of China
- Television in China
- Theatre in China

=== Sports in China ===
- Football in China
- China at the Olympics
- China at the Asian Games

=== Economy and infrastructure of China ===
- Economic rank, by nominal GDP (2026): 2nd (second)
- Agriculture in China
- Banking in China
  - People's Bank of China
- Communications in China
  - Internet in China
    - Asia-Pacific Network Information Centre
- Currency of China: Renminbi Yuan
  - ISO 4217: CNY
- Economic history of China
- Energy in China
  - Energy policy of China
  - Oil industry in China
- Health care in China
  - Abortion in China
- Chinese stock exchanges
- Tourism in China
- Transport in China
  - Airports in China
  - Rail transport in China
  - Roads in China
- Water supply and sanitation in China

=== Education in China ===
- Higher education in China

- List of universities in China

== See also ==
- International rankings of China
- List of China-related topics
- Member state of the Group of Twenty Finance Ministers and Central Bank Governors
- Member state of the United Nations
- Outline of Asia
- Outline of geography
- Outline of Hong Kong
- Outline of Macau
- Outline of Taiwan
- Outline of Tibet
