= Ethnic Chinese =

Ethnic Chinese may refer to:

- Chinese people, people or ethnic groups associated with China
  - Han Chinese people, the largest ethnic group native to China
  - Overseas Chinese, people of Chinese birth or descent living outside greater China
  - Zhonghua minzu, a political term to refer to all ethnic groups native to China

== See also ==
- Chinese (disambiguation)
- Ethnic minorities in China
- List of ethnic groups in China
