= Tang Chinese =

Tang Chinese or Tangren and variants may refer to:

- The people of the Tang dynasty of medieval China
- Middle Chinese, the reconstructed prestige dialect of Tang China
- Han Chinese people, particularly speakers of the southern Chinese branches such as Yue, Hakka, and Min
- Tangren Media, a Chinese media company
- Sugar people, Chinese folk art created using sugar

== See also ==
- Chinese (disambiguation)
