= International rankings of China =

Overview of international rankings of the People's Republic of China

The following are international rankings of China.

== Agriculture ==
| Field | Rank | Date |
|---|---|---|
| Apple production, output of 49,600,000 tons | 1 | 2023 |
| Aquatic plants production, output of 11,163,675 tons | 1 | 2005 |
| Asparagus production, output of 7,683,763 tons | 1 | 2022 |
| Cabbage production, output of 36,166,646 tons | 1 | 2023 |
| Carrot and turnip production, output of 18,463,396 tons | 1 | 2023 |
| Cauliflowers and broccoli production, output of 9,780,243 tons | 1 | 2023 |
| Chestnut production, output of 1,521,017 tons | 1 | 2023 |
| Cotton production, output of 18,500,000 tons | 1 | 2023 |
| Cucumber and gherkin production, output of 80,217,603 tons | 1 | 2023 |
| Eggplant production, output of 39,278,204 tons | 1 | 2023 |
| Fish production, output of 49,467,275 tons | 1 | 2005 |
| Fruit and vegetable production, output of 506,634,000 tons | 1 | 2004 |
| Garlic production, output of 20,743,253 tons | 1 | 2023 |
| Honey production, output of 472,221 tons | 1 | 2023 |
| Livestock of domestic sheep, 163,500,000 heads | 1 | 2019 |
| Livestock of domestic pig, 474,100,000 heads | 1 | 2014 |
| Livestock of donkeys, 8,499,000 heads | 1 | 2003 |
| Livestock of horses, 8,088,000 heads | 1 | 2003 |
| Livestock of mules, 4,194,000 heads | 1 | 2003 |
| Lettuce and chicory production, output of 14,909,060 tons | 1 | 2023 |
| Mushroom and truffle production, output of 47,149,437 tons | 1 | 2023 |
| Onion and shallot production, output of 24,918,069 tons | 1 | 2023 |
| Peach and nectarine production, output of 17,516,500 tons | 1 | 2023 |
| Peanut production, output of 16,500,000 tons | 1 | 2014 |
| Pear and quince production, output of 11,537,000 tons | 1 | 2005 |
| Persimmon production, output of 4,124,311 tons | 1 | 2023 |
| Plum and sloe production, output of 6,895,147 tons | 1 | 2023 |
| Potato production, output of 93,491,818 tons | 1 | 2023 |
| Rapeseed production, output of 14.7 million metric tons | 1 | 2016 |
| Rice production, output of 208,064,200 tons | 1 | 2023 |
| Silk production, output of 290,003 tons | 1 | 2005 |
| Spinach production, output of 11,011,000 tons | 1 | 2005 |
| Tangerine production, output of 14,152,000 tons | 1 | 2007 |
| Tea production, output of 2,400,000 million tons | 1 | 2016 |
| Tobacco production, output of 2,298,800 tons | 1 | 2000 |
| Tomato production, output of 52,600,000 tons | 1 | 2016 |
| Walnut production, output of 1,602,373 tons | 1 | 2014 |
| Watermelon production, output of 79,200,000 tons | 1 | 2016 |
| Wheat production, output of 126.2 million metric tons | 1 | 2014 |

== Communications and Technology ==
| Field | Rank | Date |
|---|---|---|
| Connectivity Scorecard (Nokia Siemens) | 17 | 2009 |
| E-readiness (Economist Intelligence Unit) | 56 | 2008 |
| Internet hosts, 20,602,000 | 5 | 2013 |
| Broadband - fixed subscriptions per 100 inhabitants, 27 | 22 | 2017 |
| Internet users, 1,051,140,000 | 1 | 2022 |
| Internet users - percent of population (%), 73.7% | 74 | 2022 |
| Main line phones, 269,910,000 | 1 | 2011 |
| Mobile phone users, 1,321,930,000 | 1 | 2016 |
| Telephones - mobile cellular, 1,100,000,000 | 1 | 2012 |
| Networked Readiness Index (WEF) | 57 | 2008 |
| Space Competitiveness Index (Futron) | 5 | 2012 |
| Global Innovation Index (WIPO) | 10 | 2026 |

== Consumption ==
| Field | Rank | Date |
|---|---|---|
| Car market, 13.64 million vehicles | 1 | 2009 |
| Rice consumption, 156.3 million metric tons per year | 1 | 2009 |

== Demographics ==
| Field | Rank | Date |
|---|---|---|
| Human Development Index, 0.788 | 75 | 2022 |
| Labour force, 781,731,676 | 1 | 2022 |
| Life expectancy at birth - total, 77.1 years | 70 | 2020 |
| Life expectancy at birth - female, 79.4 years | 76 | 2020 |
| Life expectancy at birth - male, 75.0 years | 62 | 2020 |
| Median age years, 39.8 years | 62 | 2023 |
| Population, 1,409,670,000 people | 2 | 2023 |

== Economics ==
| Field | Rank | Date |
|---|---|---|
| GDP (nominal) | 2 | 2023 |
| GDP (nominal) per capita | 64 | 2023 |
| GDP (PPP) | 1 | 2023 |
| GDP (PPP) per capita | 73 | 2023 |
| GDP growth rate, 5.2% | 30 | 2023 |
| Exports, $3,593,601,000,000 | 1 | 2022 |
| Imports, $2,715,999,000,000 | 2 | 2022 |
| Current account balance, $162,500,000,000 | 3 | 2017 |
| Forex reserves, $3,400,780,000,000 | 1 | 2023 |
| Global Competitiveness Index, 73.9 | 28 | 2019 |
| Index of Economic Freedom, 48.0 | 158 | 2023 |
| Where-to-be-born Index, 5.99 | 49 | 2013 |
| Unemployment rate, 4.1% | 32 | 2013 |
| Gold reserves, 1842.6 metric tons | 6 | 2018 |

== Energy and Environment ==
| Field | Rank | Date |
|---|---|---|
| Carbon dioxide emissions, 12,667,428,400 metric tons | 1 | 2022 |
| Carbon dioxide emissions per capita, 8.85 metric tons per capita | 26 | 2022 |
| Environmental Performance Index | 160 | 2022 |
| Hydroelectricity production, 1,303.1 TW•h per year | 1 | 2022 |
| Renewable energy production, 2,444.5 TW•h per year | 1 | 2021 |

== Geography ==
| Field | Rank | Date |
|---|---|---|
| Countries bordered, 14 | 1 | 2023 |
| Land area | 2 | 2023 |
| Land border length, 22,117 km | 1 | 2023 |
| Total area | 4 | 2023 |

== Globalization ==
| Field | Rank | Date |
|---|---|---|
| Index of Globalization (KOF) | 72 | 2014 |

== Industry ==
| Field | Rank | Date |
|---|---|---|
| Aluminium production, 41,513,000 tons | 1 | 2023 |
| Antimony production, 100,000 tons | 1 | 2016 |
| Arsenic production, 25,000 tons | 1 | 2014 |
| Bismuth production, 7,500 tons | 1 | 2015 |
| Cadmium production, 3,000 tons | 1 | 2005 |
| Cement production, 2,500,000,000 tons | 1 | 2014 |
| Coal production, 3,411.0 million tons | 1 | 2016 |
| Fluorite production, 3,000,000 tons | 1 | 2006 |
| Gold production, 455 tonnes | 1 | 2016 |
| Iron production, 375,000,000 tons | 3 | 2015 |
| Manganese production, 3,000,000 tons | 2 | 2015 |
| Mercury production, 1,150 tons | 1 | 2005 |
| Mica production, 89,000 tons | 1 | 2005 |
| Motor vehicle production, 29,015,434 vehicles | 1 | 2017 |
| Shipbuilding, 25,160,000 GT | 1 | 2015 |
| Solar panel production | 1 | 2009 |
| Steel production, 831,700,000 tons | 1 | 2017 |
| Strontium production, 700,000 tons | 1 | 2005 |
| Tin production, 120,000 tons | 1 | 2005 |
| Tin reserves, 1,500,000 tons | 1 | 2011 |
| Tungsten production, 63,000 tons | 1 | 2023 |
| Wind turbine production | 1 | 2009 |
| Zinc production, 3,100,000 tons | 1 | 2022 |

== Military ==
| Field | Rank | Date |
|---|---|---|
| Active troops, 2.183 million troops | 1 | 2010 |
| Defense spending, $296 billion | 2 | 2023 |
| Frigates in operation, 50 | 1 | 2015 |
| Police forces, 2,000,000 officers | 1 | 2018 |

== Politics ==
Political rankings
| Organization | Survey | Year | Place | Out of | Value | Ref |
|---|---|---|---|---|---|---|
| Transparency International | Corruption Perceptions Index | 2024 | 76 | 180 | Score: 43 | |
| The Economist Intelligence Unit | Democracy Index | 2023 | 148 | 167 | Overall score: 2.12 (Authoritarian) | |
| Institute for Economics and Peace | Global Peace Index | 2023 | 80 | 163 | GPI score: 2.009 | |
| Institute for Economics and Peace | Global Terrorism Index | 2024 | 73 ▲ | 163 | Very low impact of terrorism in 2024 | |
| Reporters Without Borders | Press Freedom Index | 2024 | 172 | 180 | Score: 23.36 (Very serious situation) | |
| Freedom House | Freedom in the World | 2023 | 173 | 195 | Score: 9 (Not free) | |
| Freedom House | Freedom of the Press | 2017 | 187 | 199 | Score: 87 (Not free) | |

== Society ==
Societal rankings
| Organization | Survey | Year | Place | Out of | Value | Ref |
|---|---|---|---|---|---|---|
| World Economic Forum | Gender Gap Index | 2023 | 107 | 146 | Score: 0.678 | |
| Save the Children | State of the World's Mothers | 2015 | 61 | 179 | | |
| World Health Organization | Suicide rate | 2019 | 122 | 183 | Rate: 6.7 per 100,000 | |

== Sports ==
| Field | Rank | Date |
|---|---|---|
| Women's badminton Uber Cup, 14 wins | 1 | 2018 |
| World Badminton Championships, 63 gold medals won | 1 | 2018 |
| World Amateur Go Championship, 18 wins | 1 | 2009 |
| World Table Tennis Championships, 35 team wins | 1 | 2009 |
| World Weightlifting Championships (women), 314 gold medals, 423 total medals | 1 | 2007 |

== Transport ==
| Field | Rank | Date |
|---|---|---|
| Total length of high-speed railways, 25,000 km | 1 | 2018 |
| Total length of waterways, 126,300 km | 1 | 2014 |
