= International rankings of North Korea =

North Korea ranks as the third least democratic country in the world in the Economist Intelligence Unit's Democracy Index, while The Heritage Foundation and The Wall Street Journal's Index of Economic Freedom places the country as the one with least economic freedom. According to the Press Freedom Index, North Korea has the second least free press in the world.

According to the Walk Free Foundation's Global Slavery Index, North Korea has the highest proportion of people in modern slavery. The Open Doors foundation's World Watch List lists the country as the worst persecutor of Christians in the world.

== Economy ==
Economy rankings
Organization	Survey	Year	Place	Out of	Value	Ref
The Heritage Foundation/The Wall Street Journal	Index of Economic Freedom	2023	177	177	Overall score: 4.2 (Repressed)	

== Politics, law and military ==
Political, law and military rankings
Organization	Survey	Year	Place	Out of	Value	Ref
Transparency International	Corruption Perceptions Index	2024	170	180	Score: 15 (Highly corrupt)	
The Economist Intelligence Unit	Democracy Index	2024	165	167	Overall score: 1.08 (Authoritarian)	
Institute for Economics and Peace	Global Peace Index	2023	152	163	GPI score: 2.942	
Institute for Economics and Peace	Global Terrorism Index	2024	140	163	No impact of terrorism in 2024	
Reporters Without Borders	Press Freedom Index	2024	177	180	Score: 20.66 (Very serious situation)	
Freedom House	Freedom in the World	2024	187	195	Score: 3 (Not free)	
Freedom House	Freedom of the Press	2017	198	199	Score: 98 (Not free)	

== Science and technology ==
Science and technology rankings
Organization	Survey	Year	Place	Out of	Value	Ref
United Nations Public Administration Network	E-Government Development Index	2014	149	193	EGDI: 0.2753	
United Nations Public Administration Network	E-Participation Index	2014	186	193	EPART: 0.0196	
United Nations Public Administration Network	E-Government Development Index	2016	153	193	Index: 0.2801	

== Society and quality of life ==
Social and quality of life rankings
Organization	Survey	Year	Place	Out of	Value	Ref
Walk Free Foundation	Global Slavery Index	2016	1	167	4.373% of the population in modern slavery	
United Nations Development Program	Human Development Index	1995	75	174	HDI value: 0.766 (Medium human development)	
Fund for Peace	Fragile States Index	2016	37	179	Total: 87.0 (High warning)	
Bertelsmann Stiftung	Bertelsmann Transformation Index	2022	132	137	Average value: 2.14	
Foundation for the Advancement of Liberty	World Index of Moral Freedom	2016	127	160	Index: 34.50 (Low Moral Freedom)	
International Food Policy Research Institute	Global Hunger Index	2022	97	121	Score: 24.9 (Serious)	
Open Doors	World Watch List (most persecuted Christians)	2025	1	50	Score: 98/100 (Extreme levels of persecution)	

== See also ==
- Outline of North Korea
- International rankings of South Korea
- List of international rankings
