= International rankings of Japan =

The following are international rankings of Japan.

== Cities ==
- Tokyo-Yokohama, Mercer Human Resource Consulting: Most expensive cities 2024, ranked 49
- Tokyo-Yokohama, Population of urban area ranked 3
- Osaka–Kobe–Kyoto, Population of urban area ranked 25
- Osaka, Mercer Human Resource Consulting: Most expensive cities 2008, ranked 11
- Nagoya, Population of urban area ranked 48

== Demographics ==
Japan's population is expected to age and rapidly decline this century.

- Population ranked 11 out of 228 countries and territories
- Population density ranked 37 out of 242 countries and territories
- The World Factbook 2008 estimates Life expectancy ranked 1 out of 191 countries and territories
- Total immigrant population ranked 20 out of 192 countries

== Economy ==
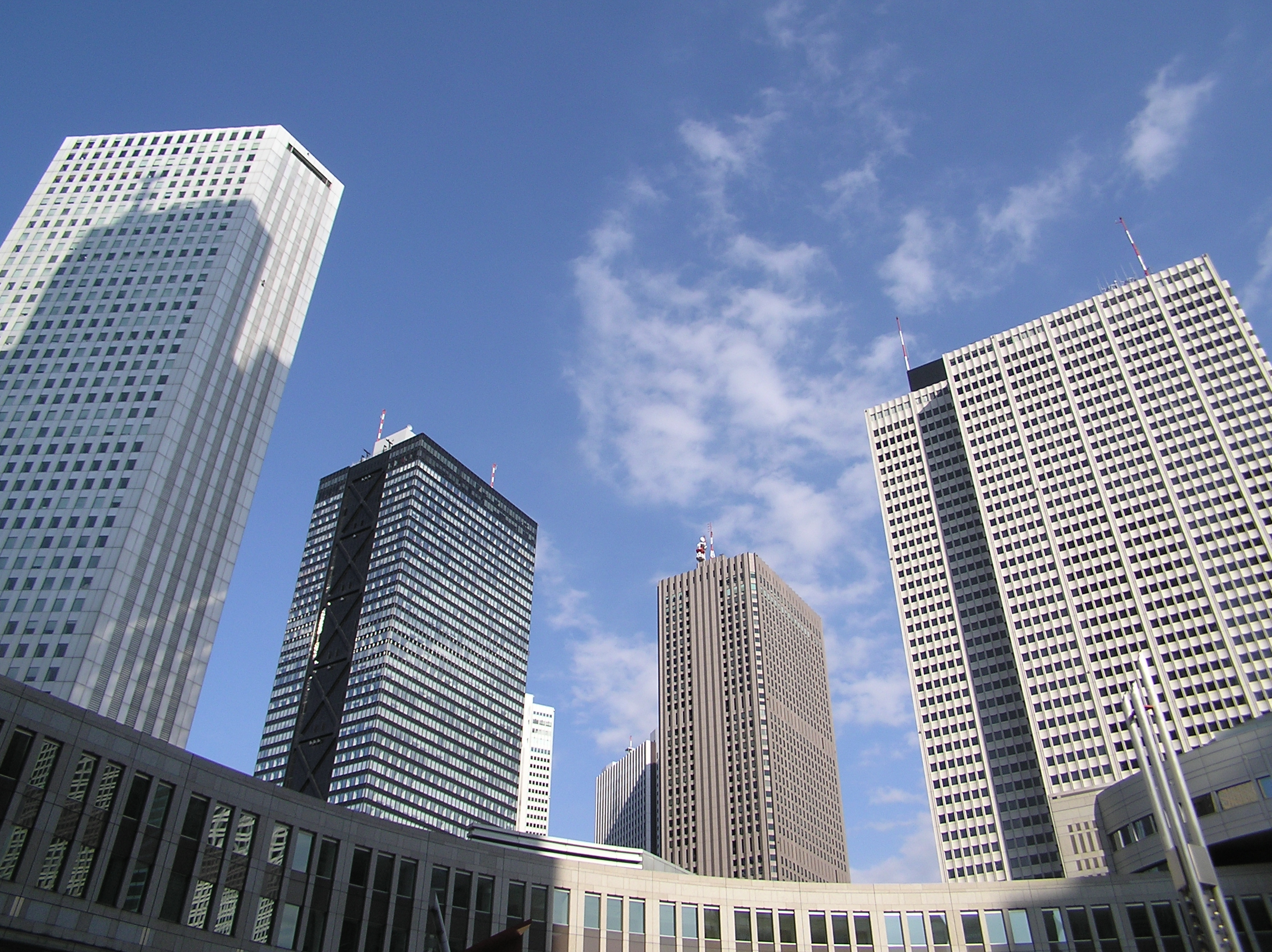
Skyscrapers in Shinjuku

- IMD International: World Competitiveness Yearbook 2005, ranked 19 out of 60 economies
- The Heritage Foundation/The Wall Street Journal: Index of Economic Freedom 2008, ranked 17 out of 157 countries
- The Economist: Quality-of-life Index 2005, ranked 17 out of 111 countries
- World Economic Forum: Global Competitiveness Report 2015-2016, ranked 6 out of 125 countries

== Education ==
- Education Index 2007, ranked 35 out of 181 countries
- OECD Programme for International Student Assessment 2022,
  - ranked 5 out of 85 countries in maths
  - ranked 2 out of 85 countries in sciences
  - ranked 2 out of 85 countries in reading
- Times Higher Education World University Rankings 2025
  - University of Tokyo, ranked 28 in the world, 5 in Asia.
  - Kyoto University, ranked 55 in the world, 13 in Asia.

== Environment ==
- Yale University Center for Environmental Law and Policy and Columbia University Center for International Earth Science Information Network: Environmental Sustainability Index 2012, ranked 23 out of 132 countries

== Geography ==
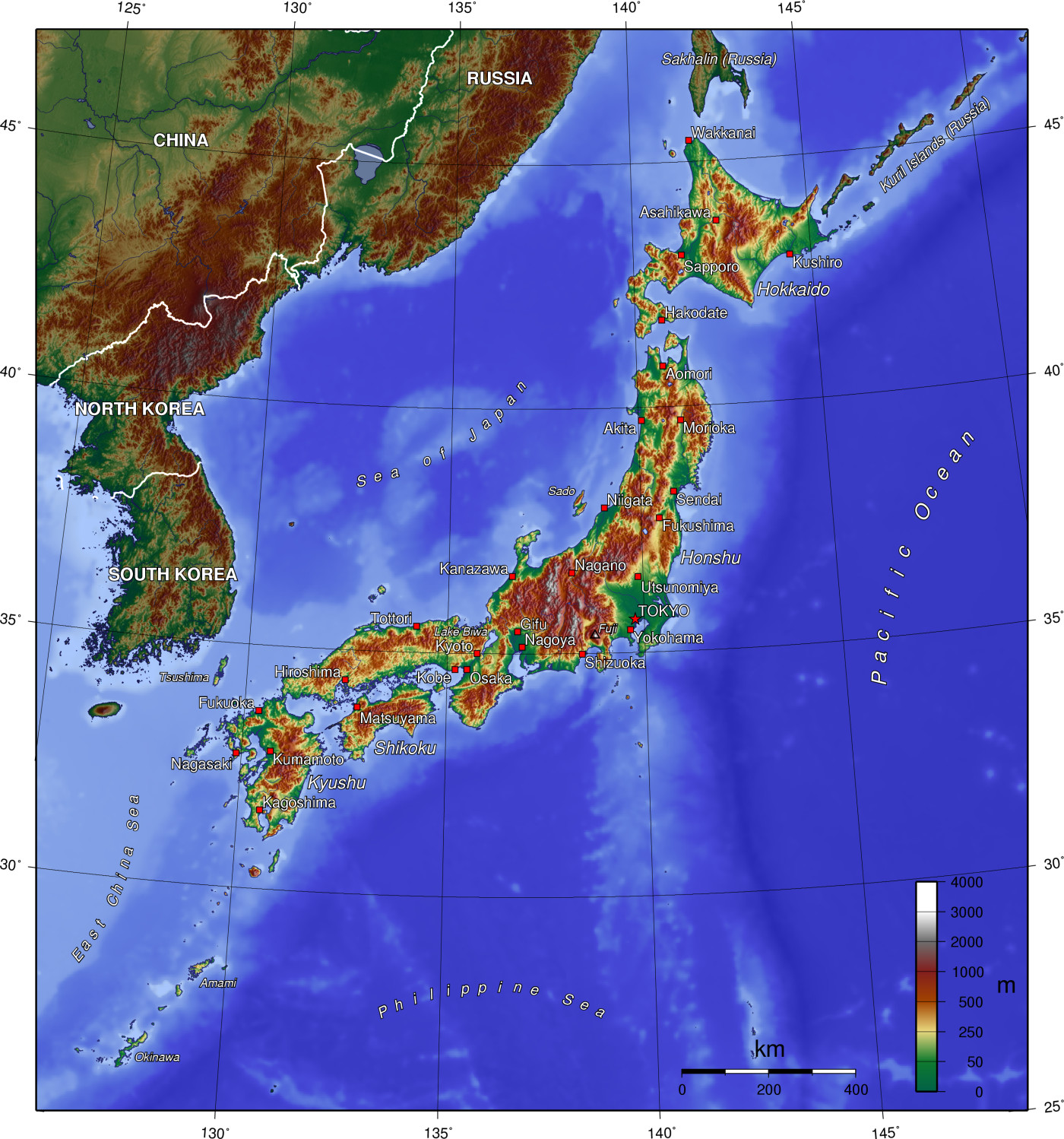
Japan is extremely mountainous, with very little arable land.

- Total area ranked 61 out of 233 countries

== Globalization ==
- KOF: Index of Globalization 2007, ranked 40 out of 122 countries
- A.T. Kearney/Foreign Policy Magazine: Globalization Index 2006, ranked 28 out of 62 countries

== Industry ==
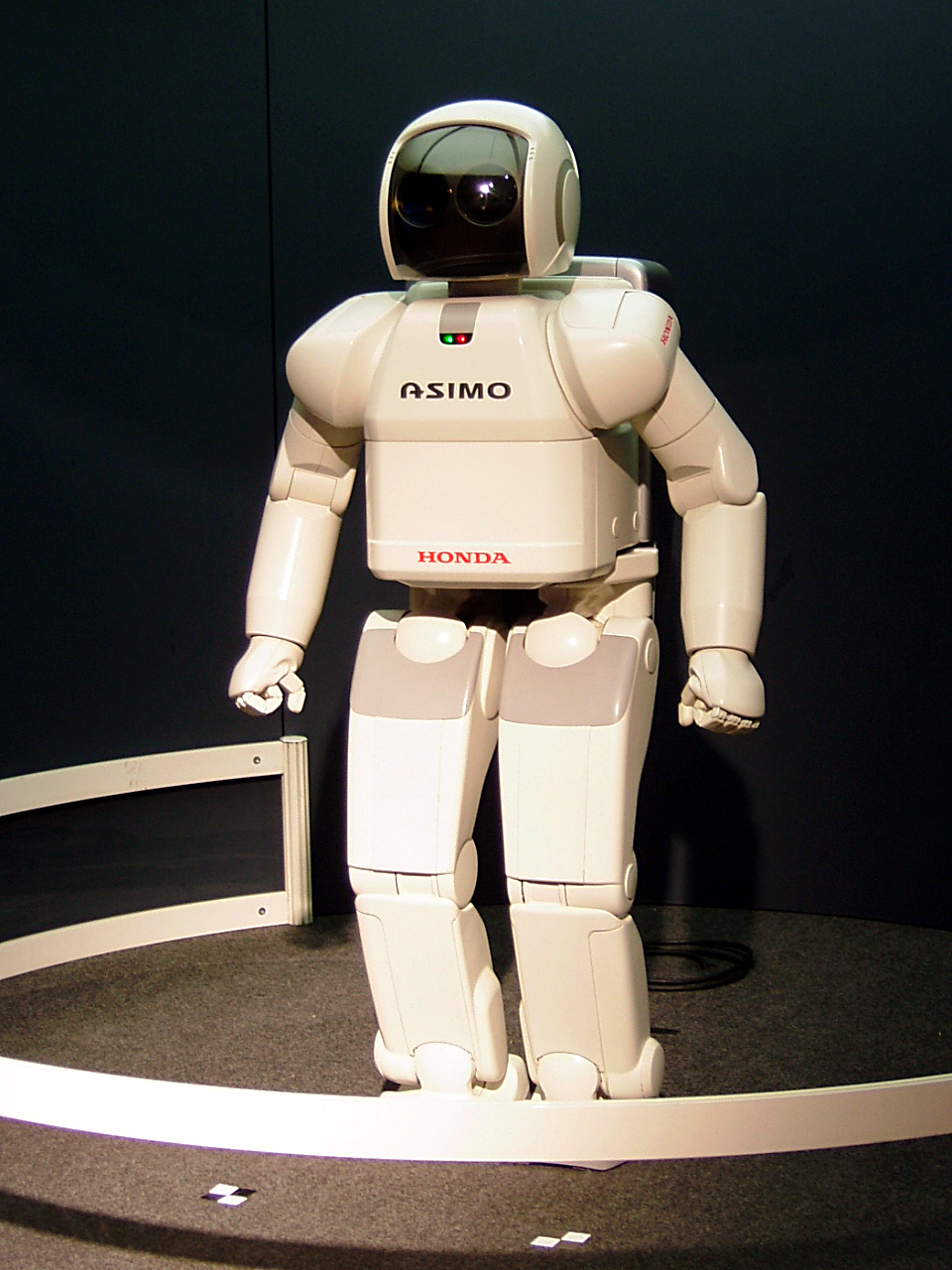
ASIMO is the most advanced humanoid robot.

- Shipbuilding total completed ships 2005, ranked 1
- OICA automobile production 2014, ranked 3 out of 53 countries
- The World Factbook: Steel Production 2014, ranked 2 out of 42 countries
- Electricity Production 2010, ranked 3 out of 210 countries

== Military ==
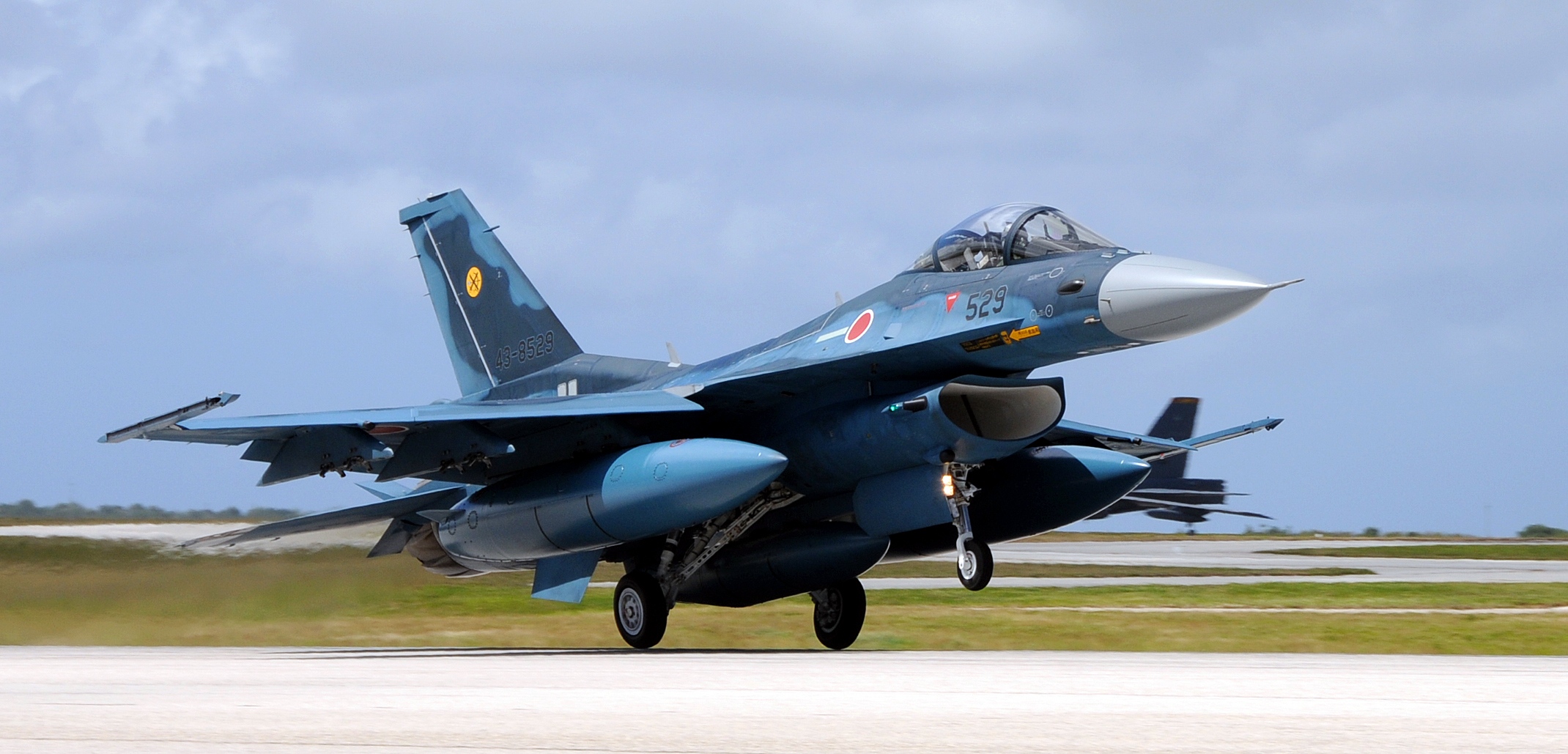
Mitsubishi F-2 fighter jet

- Center for Strategic and International Studies: active troops ranked 22 out of 166 countries

== Political ==
- Transparency International: Corruption Perceptions Index 2017, ranked 20 out of 180 countries
- Reporters without borders: Worldwide press freedom index 2008, ranked 29 out of 173 countries
- V-Dem Democracy indices: ranked 2023 23rd out of 179 countries
- Democracy Index (The Economist) ranked 2022 16th out of 167 countries

== Society ==
- United Nations: Human Development Index, ranked 12 out of 187 countries
- Institute for Economics and Peace: Global Peace Index 2014, ranked 8 out of 162
- New Economics Foundation: Happy Planet Index 2012, ranked 45 out of 151
- Save the Children: State of the World's Mothers report 2007, ranked 29 out of 110 countries
- World Health Organization: suicide rate, ranked 10 out of 100 countries
- University of Leicester: Satisfaction with Life Index 2006, ranked 90 out of 178 countries
- Gallup Global Wellbeing Index 2010, ranked 84 out of 155
- Cigarette consumption ranked 12

== Technology ==
- World Intellectual Property Organization: Patent applications 2012, ranked 1
- World Intellectual Property Organization: Patent granted 2012, ranked 1
- World Intellectual Property Organization: Global Innovation Index 2026, ranked 12 out of 139 countries
- Brown University Taubman Center for Public Policy 2006: ranked 8 in online government services
- Number of mobile phones in use ranked 9
- Number of broadband Internet users ranked 3
- Economist Intelligence Unit: E-readiness 2008, ranked 18 out of 45 countries
- World Economic Forum Networked Readiness Index 2007–2008, ranked 19 out of 127 countries
- United Nations: e-Government Readiness Index, 2008, ranked 11 out of 50 countries
- Futron: Space Competitiveness Index, 2012, ranked 4

== Tourism ==
- World Tourism Organization: World Tourism rankings 2007, ranked 28
- World Economic Forum: Travel and Tourism Competitiveness Report 2013, ranked 14 out of 140
- World Heritage Site 2014, ranked 18

== Transportation ==
- Total rapid transit systems ranked 3
