= List of countries by manganese production =

List of countries by manganese production is a compilation of countries ranked according to their annual output of manganese ore. Manganese is a critical industrial metal primarily used in steel production, as well as in batteries, chemicals, and other metallurgical applications. Global production is concentrated in a small number of countries with significant mineral reserves.

== List of countries ==
This is a list of countries by manganese ore mining (by manganese content) in 2025, based on United States Geological Survey.

Country	Production (tonnes)	Reserves (tonnes)
South Africa	7,600,000	560,000,000
Gabon	5,000,000	61,000,000
Ghana	2,000,000	13,000,000
Australia	1,600,000	580,000,000
Brazil	800,000	300,000,000
India	790,000	34,000,000
China	700,000	260,000,000
Ivory Coast	350,000	N/A
World	20,000,000	1,800,000,000

According to the British Geological Survey, substantial manganese ore mining also takes place in Kazakhstan, Mexico, Malaysia and Iran.
