= List of countries by stem cell research trials =

This is a list of countries by stem cell research trials for the purpose of commercializing treatments as of June 2020, using data from ClinicalTrials.gov.

Rank	Country/Territory	Number of clinical trials
1	Iran	224
2	United States	212
3	South Korea	186
4	Australia	154
5	China	135
6	Spain	134
7	Israel	126
8	Germany	125
9	Canada	100
10	India	89
11	Malaysia	87
12	Panama	79
13	United Kingdom	72
14	Hong Kong	67
