= List of countries by time devoted to leisure and personal care =

This is a list of countries by time devoted to leisure and personal care, as published by the OECD.

The reference year is 2016 for the United States; 2014–15 for the United Kingdom; 2011 for Japan; 2010 for Canada, Norway, South Africa; 2009-10 for Estonia, Finland, France, New Zealand, Spain; 2009 for South Korea; 2008–09 for Austria, Italy; 2006 for Australia; 2005 for Belgium; 2003-04 for Poland; 2003 for Latvia; 2001–02 for Germany; 2001 for Denmark; 2000–01 for Slovenia and Sweden.

As defined by the OECD, "Leisure includes a wide range of indoor and outdoor activities such as walking and hiking, sports, entertainment and cultural activities, socializing with friends and family, volunteering, taking a nap, playing games, watching television, using computers, recreational gardening, etc. Personal care activities include sleeping (but not taking a nap), eating and drinking, and other household or medical or personal services (hygiene, visits to the doctor, hairdresser, etc.) consumed by the respondent. Travel time related to personal care is also included. The information is generally collected through national time use surveys, which involve respondents keeping a diary of their activities over one or several representative days for a given period."

== List ==
Country	Hours spent on leisure and personal care
France	16.36
Spain	15.93
Netherlands	15.90
Denmark	15.87
Belgium	15.77
Norway	15.56
Germany	15.55
Ireland	15.28
Sweden	15.18
Finland	15.17
Luxembourg	15.15
Czech Republic	15.06
Hungary	15.06
Switzerland	15.02
Slovakia	15.01
United Kingdom	14.92
Chile	14.90
Estonia	14.90
Russia	14.90
Italy	14.89
Portugal	14.89
New Zealand	14.87
Japan	14.85
Slovenia	14.75
South Africa	14.73
South Korea	14.70
Greece	14.67
Austria	14.55
Brazil	14.45
United States	14.44
Poland	14.42
Canada	14.41
Australia	14.35
Iceland	14.15
Israel	13.93
Latvia	13.83
Mexico	12.74
Turkey	12.59

== See also ==
- Quality of life
