= List of countries by consultation on rule-making =

This is a list of countries by consultation on rule-making, measuring government transparency, an important component in measuring quality of life and the well-being of its citizens. The indicator published by the OECD for 2008 is a weighted average of yes/no answers to various questions on the existence of law consultation by citizens, of formal procedures enabling general public to impact regulation and governmental actions. The indicator describes the extent to which formal consultation processes are built in at key stages of the design of regulatory proposals, and what mechanisms exist for the outcome of that consultation to influence the preparation of draft primary laws and subordinate regulations.

This indicator has been computed based on responses to the OECD's survey of regulatory management systems, where respondents were government officials in OECD countries. It is based on questions about the existence of formal procedures enabling general public, business and civil society organisations to impact regulation and governmental actions, and on whether citizens’ views on such consultation procedures are made public.

Rank	Country/Territory	Government transparency
1	United Kingdom	11.5
2	Sweden	10.9
3	Germany	10.8
4	Australia	10.5
5	Canada	10.5
6	South Korea	10.4
7	New Zealand	10.3
8	Slovenia	10.3
9	Ireland	9.0
10	Mexico	9.0
11	Finland	9.0
12	Switzerland	8.4
13	United States	8.3
14	Norway	8.1
15	Hungary	7.9
16	Japan	7.3
17	Spain	7.3
18	Austria	7.1
19	Denmark	7.0
20	Czech Republic	6.8
21	Slovakia	6.6
22	Portugal	6.5
23	Greece	6.5
24	Netherlands	6.1
25	Luxembourg	6.0
26	Turkey	5.5
27	Iceland	5.1
28	Italy	5.0
29	Poland	4.5
30	Belgium	4.5
31	Brazil	4.0
32	France	3.5
33	Estonia	3.3
34	Israel	2.5
35	Russia	2.5
36	Chile	2.0

== See also ==
- Government transparency
