= Chinese =

Chinese may refer to:

- Topics related to China
- Chinese people, people identified with China, through nationality, citizenship or ethnicity
  - Han Chinese, the dominant ethnic group of China
  - Zhonghua minzu, the supra-ethnic concept of the Chinese nation
  - List of ethnic groups in China, people of various ethnicities in contemporary China
  - Ethnic minorities in China, people of non-Han Chinese ethnicities in modern China
  - Ethnic groups in Chinese history, people of various ethnicities in historical China
  - Nationals of the People's Republic of China
  - Nationals of the Republic of China
  - Overseas Chinese, Chinese people residing outside the territories of mainland China, Hong Kong, Macau, and Taiwan
- Sinitic languages, the major branch of the Sino-Tibetan language family
  - Chinese language, a group of related languages spoken predominantly in China, sharing a written script (Chinese characters in traditional and simplified forms)
    - Standard Chinese, the standard form of Mandarin Chinese in mainland China, similar to forms of Mandarin Chinese in Taiwan and Singapore
    - Varieties of Chinese, topolects grouped under Chinese languages
    - Written Chinese, writing scripts used for Chinese languages
      - Chinese characters, logograms used for the writing of East Asian languages
- Chinese cuisine, styles of food originating from China or their derivatives
- "Chinese", a song about take out meals by Lily Allen from It's Not Me, It's You

== See also ==
- Tang Chinese (disambiguation)
