= Bribe Payers Index =

Ranking of public sector corruption by Transparency International

Bribe Payers Index (BPI) is a measure of how willing a nation's multinational corporations appear to engage in corrupt business practices. The first BPI was published by Transparency International on October 26, 1999, and the last one in 2011. Spokesperson Shubham Kaushik said the organization "decided to discontinue the survey due to funding issues and to focus on issues that are more in line with our advocacy goals".

According to Lucio Picci, this measure "is marred by fatal methodological flaws because it confuses levels of corruption and propensities to corrupt", and it is an example of how flawed measures of corruption may promote a narratve of "national culpability".

== BPI 2011 ==
=== Methodology ===
The BPI 2011 ranked 28 of the leading exporting countries on the likelihood that their multinational businesses will use bribes when operating abroad. The ranking is calculated from responses by businesses to two questions on the World Economic Forum's Executive Opinion Survey.

The first question asks for the country of origin of foreign-owned companies doing the most business in their country. The second question is: "In your experience, to what extent do firms from the countries you have selected make undocumented extra payments or bribes?" Answers are to be given on a scale of 1 (bribes are common or even mandatory) to 10 (bribes are unknown).

The BPI ranking is the average score, with higher scores suggesting a lower likelihood of using bribery.

These countries were selected as the leading international or regional exporting countries. Their combined global exports represented 75 percent of the world's total in 2006. Countries that paid fewer bribes have higher BPIs.

=== Rankings ===
Rank	Country/Territory	Average score
1	Japan	8.9
2	Netherlands	8.8
2	Switzerland	8.8
4	Belgium	8.7
5	Germany	8.6
6	Australia	8.5
6	Canada	8.4
8	Singapore	8.3
8	United Kingdom	8.3
10	United States	8.1
11	France	8.0
11	Spain	8.0
13	South Korea	7.9
14	Brazil	7.7
15	Hong Kong	7.6
15	Italy	7.6
15	Malaysia	7.6
15	South Africa	7.6
19	Taiwan	7.5
19	India	7.5
19	Turkey	7.5
22	Saudi Arabia	7.4
23	Argentina	7.3
23	United Arab Emirates	7.3
25	Indonesia	7.1
26	Mexico	7.0
27	China	6.5
28	Russia	6.1

== See also ==
- Corruption Perceptions Index
- Foreign Corrupt Practices Act
- Global Corruption Barometer
- OECD Anti-Bribery Convention
- Transparency International
- United Nations Convention against Corruption

== Sources ==
- Bribe Payers Index (BPI) 2006 Analysis Report
