= Networked Readiness Index =

Index published by the World Economic Forum

The Networked Readiness Index is an index published annually by the World Economic Forum in collaboration with INSEAD, as part of their annual Global Information Technology Report. Since 2019, it has been published by The Portulans Institute in collaboration with other organisations. Past collaborations include Saïd Business School, Amazon Web Services and Brazilian National Confederation of Industry among others.

It aims to measure the degree of readiness of countries to exploit opportunities offered by information and communications technology. The Networked Readiness Index was first conceived of and constructed by Geoffrey Kirkman, Jeffrey Sachs and Carlos Osorio in 2002 at Harvard University.

The 2016 edition covers 139 nations. The 2025 edition covers 127 nations. Countries are excluded from the rankings due to limitations in data coverage.
