= International rankings of Hong Kong =

The following are international rankings of Hong Kong by categories.

Note: For rankings with negative connotations, the orders are inverted such that the best country/regions are always ranked "1st".

== Overall ==
Overall Rankings
Name	Year	Place	Out of #	Reference	Remarks
United Nations - Human Development Index	2019	4	189		Norway 1, Singapore 9, S.Korea 22, Japan 19, M.China 85
EIU – Global Liveability Ranking	2019	38	140		Vienna 1, Osaka 4, Tokyo 7, Singapore 40
Mercer – Quality of Living Survey	2019	71	231		Vienna 1, Singapore 25, Tokyo 49, Seoul 77, Shanghai 103
Monocle – Quality of Life Survey	2016	18	25+		Tokyo 1, Singapore 20
The Economist - Where-to-be-born Index	2013	10	80		Singapore 6, S.Korea 19, Japan 25, M.China 49
Legatum Prosperity Index	2019	15	167		Denmark 1, Singapore 16, Japan 19, China 57
Arcadis - Sustainable Cities Index	2019	9	100		Singapore 4, Seoul 13, Tokyo 33, Shanghai 76
IESE - Cities in Motion Index	2019	11	174		Tokyo 6, Singapore 7, Seoul 12, Shanghai 59

== Economy ==
Economic Rankings
Name	Year	Place	Out of #	Reference	Remarks
International Labour Organization – Average monthly earnings (PPP)	2012	30	72		Singapore 14, S.Korea 10, Japan 17, M.China 57
International Finance Corporation/World Bank – Ease of Doing Business Index	2020	3	189		Singapore 2, S.Korea 5, Taiwan 15, China 31
CIA The World Factbook – Exports	2017	10	225		
CIA The World Factbook – Imports	2013	8	222		
World Bank - GDP per Capita (current US$)	2012	27	214		
World Bank - GNI per Capita, PPP (current Intl$)	2012	12	184		
IMF – Official Reserve Assets	2014 Jan	6	75		
WEF – Global Competitiveness Index	2015-2016	7	140		Singapore 2, S.Korea 26, Japan 6, M.China 28
WEF – Global Enabling Trade Index	2014	2	138		
IMD – World Competitiveness Yearbook	2020	5	63		Singapore 1, S.Korea 23, Japan 34, M.China 20
Wall Street Journal / The Heritage Foundation – Index of Economic Freedom	2016	1	178	^{[unfit]}	Singapore 2, S.Korea 27, Japan 22, M.China 144
MIT - Economic Complexity Index	2014	40	144		Singapore 8, S.Korea 6, Japan 1, M.China 37
PwC/World Bank - Overall Paying Taxes	2014	4	189		
Grant Thornton - Global Dynamism Index	2013	16	60		
FedEx Opportunity Index - Access Index® Rank	2008	1	109		
McKinsey - Connectedness Index	2012	2	131		
EIU - Digital economy rankings	2010	7	70		

== Business and Industry ==
Business and Industry Rankings
Name	Year	Place	Out of #	Reference	Remarks
EIU – Business Environment Rankings	2014-2018	3	82		Singapore 1, S.Korea 26, Japan 27, M.China 50
Forbes - Best Countries for Business	2015	11	145		Singapore 8, Japan 23, S.Korea 33, M.China 94
World Tourism Organization - World Tourism rankings	2014 May	14	193		
WEF – Financial Development Index	2012	1	62		
WEF - Travel and Tourism Competitiveness Report	2013	15	140		
EIU – IT industry competitiveness index	2011	19	66		Singapore 3, S.Korea 19, Japan 16, M.China 38
World Bank - Logistics Performance Index	2014	15	160		

== Education ==
Education Rankings
Name	Year	Place	Out of #	Reference	Remark
OECD Programme for International Student Assessment - Maths
OECD Programme for International Student Assessment - Maths	2012	3	65		Singapore 2, S.Korea 5, Japan 7, Shanghai 1
OECD Programme for International Student Assessment - Maths	2009	3	65		
OECD Programme for International Student Assessment - Maths	2006	3	57		
OECD Programme for International Student Assessment - Reading
OECD Programme for International Student Assessment - Reading	2012	2	65		Singapore 3, S.Korea 5, Japan 4, Shanghai 1
OECD Programme for International Student Assessment - Reading	2009	4	65		
OECD Programme for International Student Assessment - Reading	2006	3	57		
OECD Programme for International Student Assessment - Science
OECD Programme for International Student Assessment - Science	2012	2	65		Singapore 3, S.Korea 7, Japan 4, Shanghai 1
OECD Programme for International Student Assessment - Science	2009	3	65		
OECD Programme for International Student Assessment - Science	2006	3	57		
OECD Programme for International Student Assessment - Problem Solving
OECD Programme for International Student Assessment - Problem Solving	2012	5	65		Singapore 1, S.Korea 2, Japan 3, Shanghai 6

== Environment ==
Environmental Rankings
Name	Year	Place	Out of #	Reference	Remarks
South Pacific Applied Geoscience Commission – Environmental Vulnerability Index	2004	128	234		
New Economics Foundation – Happy Planet Index	2016	123	140	Child care leave application	Singapore n/a, S Korea 80, Japan 58, China 72

== Health & Safety ==
Health & Safety Rankings
Name	Year	Place	Out of #	Reference	Remarks
WHO - Infant mortality (1=lowest)	2005-2010	1	193		
WHO - Life expectancy (1=highest)	2005-2010	1	193		
UNODC - Intentional homicide rate	2012 or latest data available	6	219		
The Economist - Safe Cities Index	2015	11	50		Singapore 2, Seoul 24, Tokyo 1, Shanghai 30

== Infrastructure ==
Infrastructure Rankings
Name	Year	Place	Out of #	Reference	Remark
Mercer - Cities with the best infrastructure	2014	6	50		
Airports Council International, Airport Service Quality Awards - Asia Pacific	2013	below 5	75		
Skytrax, World Airport Award	2014	4	410+		
Skytrax, World Airlines Awards	2014	1 (Cathay Pacific)	100+		
The World Factbook – Number of Heliports	2013	24	115		
The World Factbook - Expressway density	2012 (for HK)	194	222		
United Nations - ICT Development Index	2015	11	167		S.Korea 1, Japan 11, Singapore 19, M.China 82
Akamai Technologies – Internet connection speed	2013	4	188+		
Google - Smartphone penetration	2012	8	47		
WEF - Networked Readiness Index	2014	8	148		

== Innovation ==
Innovation Rankings
Name	Year	Place	Out of #	Reference	Remark
Global Open Data Index - Overview	2016	23	94		Singapore 16, Japan 13
World Intellectual Property Indicators - Patents by origin (residents & abroad)	2014	38	122		Singapore 26, M.China 1, Japan 3, S.Korea 4
World Intellectual Property Indicators - Patents by origin (residents only)	2014	59	97		Singapore 30, M.China 1, Japan 3, S.Korea 4
World Intellectual Property Indicators - Trademarks by origin (residents & abroad)	2014	22	122		Singapore 34, M.China 1, Japan 5, S.Korea 10
World Intellectual Property Indicators - Trademarks by origin (residents only)	2014	23	95		Singapore 49, M.China 1, Japan 7, S.Korea 9
World Intellectual Property Indicators - Designs by origin (residents & abroad)	2014	25	125		Singapore 33, M.China 1, Japan 7, S.Korea 3
World Intellectual Property Indicators - Designs by origin (residents only)	2014	31	93		Singapore 44, M.China 1, Japan 6, S.Korea 3
World Intellectual Property Indicators - Resident application design counts per population	2014	15	20+		Singapore 19, M.China 20+, Japan 16, S.Korea 1
Bloomberg Innovation Index	2015	34	50		
The Boston Consulting Group - International Innovation Index	2009	6	110		
World Intellectual Property Organization - Global Innovation Index	2026	14	139		
World Bank - Research and development spending as % of GDP	Most recent value	44	123		S.Korea 2, Japan 3, M.China 16, Singapore 17
HackerRank - Which Country Has the Best Developers	2016	17	50		M.China 1, Japan 6, Singapore 13, S.Korea 22

== Governance ==
Governance Rankings
Name	Year	Place	Out of #	Reference	Remark
Transparency International – Bribe Payers Index	2011	15	28		
World Justice Project – Rule of Law Index	2014	16	102		Singapore 9, M.China 71, Japan 13, S.Korea 11
The Economist Intelligence Unit – Democracy Index	2015	63	167		
Reporters without Borders – World Press Freedom Index	2014	70	180		Singapore 153, M.China 176, Japan 61, S.Korea 60
Property Rights Alliance – International Property Rights Index	2013	14	130		
Transparency International – Corruption Perception Index	2013	15	177		
Wasada IAC – Joint E-Government Ranking	2014	26	61		Singapore 2, S.Korea 3, Japan 5, M.China 39

== Society ==
Social Rankings
Name	Year	Place	Out of #	Reference	Remark
The World Factbook - Distribution of Family Income (Gini Index)	2011 for HK	129 (1=lowest)	141		Singapore 110, S.Korea 30, Japan 66, M.China 115
Gallup – Potential Net Migration Index (Asia Pacific)	2010-2012	10 (1 meaning highest potential immigration)	28		Singapore 3, S.Korea 18, Japan 15, M.China 12
Walk Free Foundation - Global Slavery Index	2013	22	162		
United Nations - World Happiness Report	2022	81	157		Singapore 27, Japan 54, S.Korea 59, M.China 72
Charities Aid Foundation - World Giving Index	2012	19	145		

== Rankings by Years ==
The following are international rankings of Hong Kong by years.

Date	Contest	Host organisation	Ranking	Note
2002 and 2006	National IQ Rankings	IQ and the Wealth of Nations, the University of Ulster	1/185 countries	Controversial
2001–05	World's Best Airports	Skytrax	1/155 countries	
2006	6th Annual Global e-Government Study (Brown University)	Global e-Government	20/198 countries	
2006	Annual Worldwide Press Freedom Index 2006	Reporters Without Borders	59/168 countries	
2006	Corruption Perceptions Index	Transparency International	15/163 countries	
2006	World Competitiveness Yearbook 2006	IMD International	2/61 economies	Economies include those of countries and regions
2006	World City's Skyline/Skyscrapers	Emporis Data Committee (EDC)	1/100 major cities	Cities ranked by the visual impact of their skylines
2006	Global Competitiveness Report - Growth Competitiveness Index Ranking	World Economic Forum	11/125 countries	
2006	World's Best Airports	Skytrax	2/165 countries	
2006	Business Competitiveness Index - BCI	World Economic Forum	10/121 countries	
2006	Human Development Index - HDI	United Nations	22/177 countries	
2006	Access Index (p.19)]	FedEx: The Power of Access - 2006 Access Index	1/75 countries	
2007	Travel and Tourism Competitiveness Index	World Economic Forum	6/124 countries	
2007	Index of Economic Freedom	The Heritage Foundation/The Wall Street Journal: 2008^{[unfit]}	1/157 countries	Ranked 1st for 14 years in a row
2007	Leading Centers of Commerce	"MasterCard study". Forbes. Archived from the original on June 4, 2011.	5/63 countries	rated 63 cities according to their legal and political framework, economic stability, ease of doing business, financial flow, business center status, and knowledge creation and information flow
2007	World's most expensive cost-of-living	Mercer Human Resource Consulting	5/143 cities	
2007	World's Best Airports	Skytrax	1/155 countries	
2007	World Competitiveness Yearbook 2007	IMD International	3/55 economies	The IMD World Competitiveness Yearbook 2007 analyses and ranks the ability of nations to create and maintain an environment that sustains the competitiveness of enterprises
2007	E-readiness	Economist Intelligence Unit	4/69 countries	e-Readiness is the ability to use Information and Communication Technologies (ICT) to develop one's economy and to foster one's welfare
2007	World's best place for doing business	World Bank	4/178 countries	Economies are ranked on their ease of doing business, from 1–178, with first place being the best. A high ranking on the ease of doing business index means the regulatory environment is conducive to the operation of business. This index averages the country's percentile rankings on 10 topics, made up of a variety of indicators, giving equal weight to each topic
2007	Asia's best corporate governance survey	Asian Corporate Governance Association	1/11 countries	
2007	Global Financial Centre Index	City of London	3/10 cities	The GFCI is a ranking of the competitiveness of financial centres based on a number of existing indices in combination with a regular survey of senior industry figures from around the world. Hong Kong ranked third behind New York and London.
2007	IT industry competitiveness index	Economist Intelligence Unit	21/64 countries	Index measures a supply of skills, an innovation-friendly culture, world-class technology infrastructure, a legal regime and well-balanced government support, as well as a competition-friendly business environment. Those countries possessing most of these “competitiveness enablers” are also home to high-performance IT industries: all but four of the top 22 countries in the EIU are also among the world's top countries in terms of IT labour productivity
2007	Asian Cities of the Future 07/08	Financial Time	1/38 cities	
2008	Capital Access Index 2007	Milken Institute	1/122 countries	
2008	Location Ranking Survey	ECA International	15/254 locations	
2008	World Competitiveness Yearbook	IMD	3/55 economies	
2008	Mortalities Due to Air Pollution	WHO	8th	
