= Competitiveness Index =

Competitiveness Index may refer to:

- Global Competitiveness Report based on the Global Competitiveness Index, published by the World Economic Forum
- World Competitiveness Yearbook published by the Swiss International Institute for Management Development
- Space Competitiveness Index, published annually since 2008 by Futron Corporation
- Travel and Tourism Competitiveness Report (Vietnam)
- India City Competitiveness Index
- IT industry competitiveness index

See also

- Competition (disambiguation)
