= Outline of Hong Kong =

Special administrative region of China

The Flag of Hong Kong

The Emblem of Hong Kong

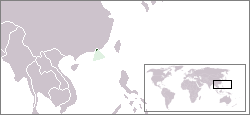
The location of Hong Kong

An enlargeable political map of the Hong Kong Special Administrative Region of the People's Republic of China

The following outline is provided as an overview of and topical guide to Hong Kong:

Hong Kong – one of two special administrative regions of China, the other being Macau. The territory lies on the eastern side of the Pearl River Delta, bordering Guangdong province in the north and facing the South China Sea in the east, west and south. Beginning as a trading port in the 19th century, Hong Kong has developed into one of the world's leading financial centres.

Hong Kong was a Crown colony of the United Kingdom from 1842 to 1981 and was a British dependent territory from 1981 until the transfer of its sovereignty to the People's Republic of China in 1997. The Sino-British Joint Declaration and the Basic Law of Hong Kong stipulate that Hong Kong operate with a high degree of autonomy until at least 2047, fifty years after the transfer.

Under the “one country, two systems” policy, the Central People's Government is responsible for the territory's defence and foreign affairs, while the Government of Hong Kong is responsible for its own legal system, police force, monetary system, customs policy, immigration policy, and delegates to international organisations and events.

== General reference ==
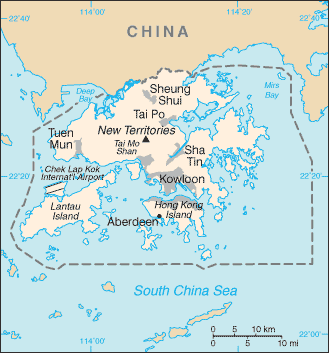
An enlargeable basic map of Hong Kong

- Pronunciation: /ˈhɒŋkɒŋ/
- Common English country name: Hong Kong
- Official English country name: The Hong Kong Special Administrative Region of the People's Republic of China
- Common endonym(s):
- Official endonym(s):
- Adjectives: Hong Kong, Hongkonger
- Demonym(s): Hongkonger, Hongkongese
- Etymology: Refer to Name of Hong Kong.
- International rankings of Hong Kong
- ISO country codes: HK, HKG, 344
- ISO region codes: See ISO 3166-2:HK
- Internet country code top-level domain: .hk

== Geography of Hong Kong ==
- Hong Kong is: de jure, a Chinese special administrative region
- Location:
  - Northern Hemisphere and Eastern Hemisphere
  - Eurasia
    - Asia
      - East Asia
        - Pearl River Delta
  - Time zone: Hong Kong Time (UTC+08)
  - Extreme points of Hong Kong
    - High: Tai Mo Shan 958 m (3,143 ft)
    - Low: South China Sea 0 m
- Population of Hong Kong: 7,108,100 (June 30, 2011)
- Area of Hong Kong: 1,104 km^{2}
- Atlas of Hong Kong

=== Environment of Hong Kong ===
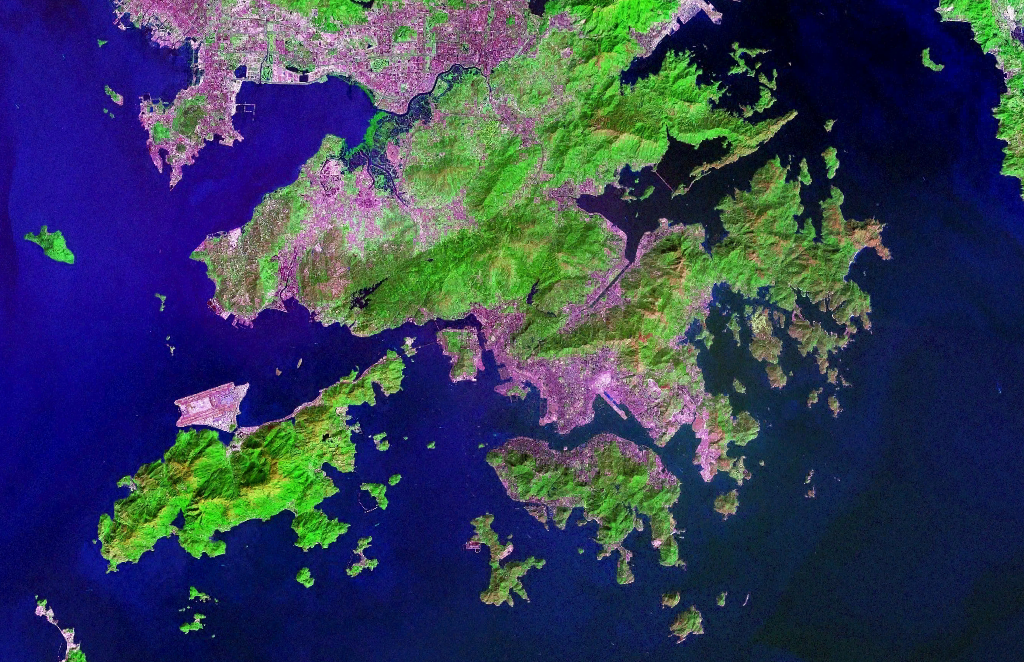
An enlargeable false colour satellite image of Hong Kong

- Climate of Hong Kong
- Renewable energy in Hong Kong
- Geology of Hong Kong
- Protected areas of Hong Kong
  - Biosphere reserves in Hong Kong
  - National parks of Hong Kong
- Wildlife of Hong Kong
  - Fauna of Hong Kong
    - Birds of Hong Kong
    - Mammals of Hong Kong

==== Natural geographic features of Hong Kong ====
- Glaciers of Hong Kong: none
- Islands of Hong Kong
- Lakes of Hong Kong
- Mountains of Hong Kong
  - Volcanoes in Hong Kong: none
- Rivers of Hong Kong
- World Heritage Sites in Hong Kong: None

=== Regions of Hong Kong ===
==== Administrative divisions of Hong Kong ====
- Districts of Hong Kong

===== Municipalities of Hong Kong =====
- Capital of Hong Kong: Hong Kong Central
- Cities of Hong Kong

== Government and politics of Hong Kong ==
Politics of Hong Kong

- Form of government:
- Capital of Hong Kong: Hong Kong Central
- Elections in Hong Kong
- Political parties in Hong Kong
- Taxation in Hong Kong
- Transfer of sovereignty over Hong Kong
  - Hong Kong handover ceremony

=== Branches of the government of Hong Kong ===
Government of Hong Kong

==== Executive branch of the government of Hong Kong ====
- Head of state and Head of government: Chief Executive of Hong Kong, Donald Tsang
- Cabinet of Hong Kong
  - Government departments and agencies in Hong Kong
    - Department of Health
    - Department of Justice
    - Immigration Department
    - Customs and Excise Department
    - Food and Environmental Hygiene Department
    - Leisure and Cultural Services Department
    - Housing Department
    - More...

==== Legislative branch of the government of Hong Kong ====
- Legislative Council (unicameral)
  - President of the Legislative Council (Speaker): Andrew Leung

==== Judicial branch of the government of Hong Kong ====
Judiciary of Hong Kong

- Department of Justice
- Court of Final Appeal
- High Court
  - Court of Appeal
  - Court of First Instance
- District Court
- Magistrates' court

=== Foreign relations of Hong Kong ===
Foreign relations of Hong Kong

- Diplomatic missions in Hong Kong

==== International organization membership ====
International organization membership of Hong Kong The Hong Kong Special Administrative Region is a member of:

- Asian Development Bank (ADB)
- Asia-Pacific Economic Cooperation (APEC)
- Bank for International Settlements (BIS)
- International Chamber of Commerce (ICC)
- International Hydrographic Organization (IHO)
- International Maritime Organization (IMO) (associate)
- International Monetary Fund (IMF)
- International Olympic Committee (IOC)
- International Organization for Standardization (ISO) (correspondent)
- International Trade Union Confederation (ITUC)
- Universal Postal Union (UPU)
- World Confederation of Labour (WCL)
- World Customs Organization (WCO)
- World Federation of Trade Unions (WFTU)
- World Meteorological Organization (WMO)
- World Tourism Organization (UNWTO) (associate)
- World Trade Organization (WTO)

=== Law and order in Hong Kong ===
Law of Hong Kong

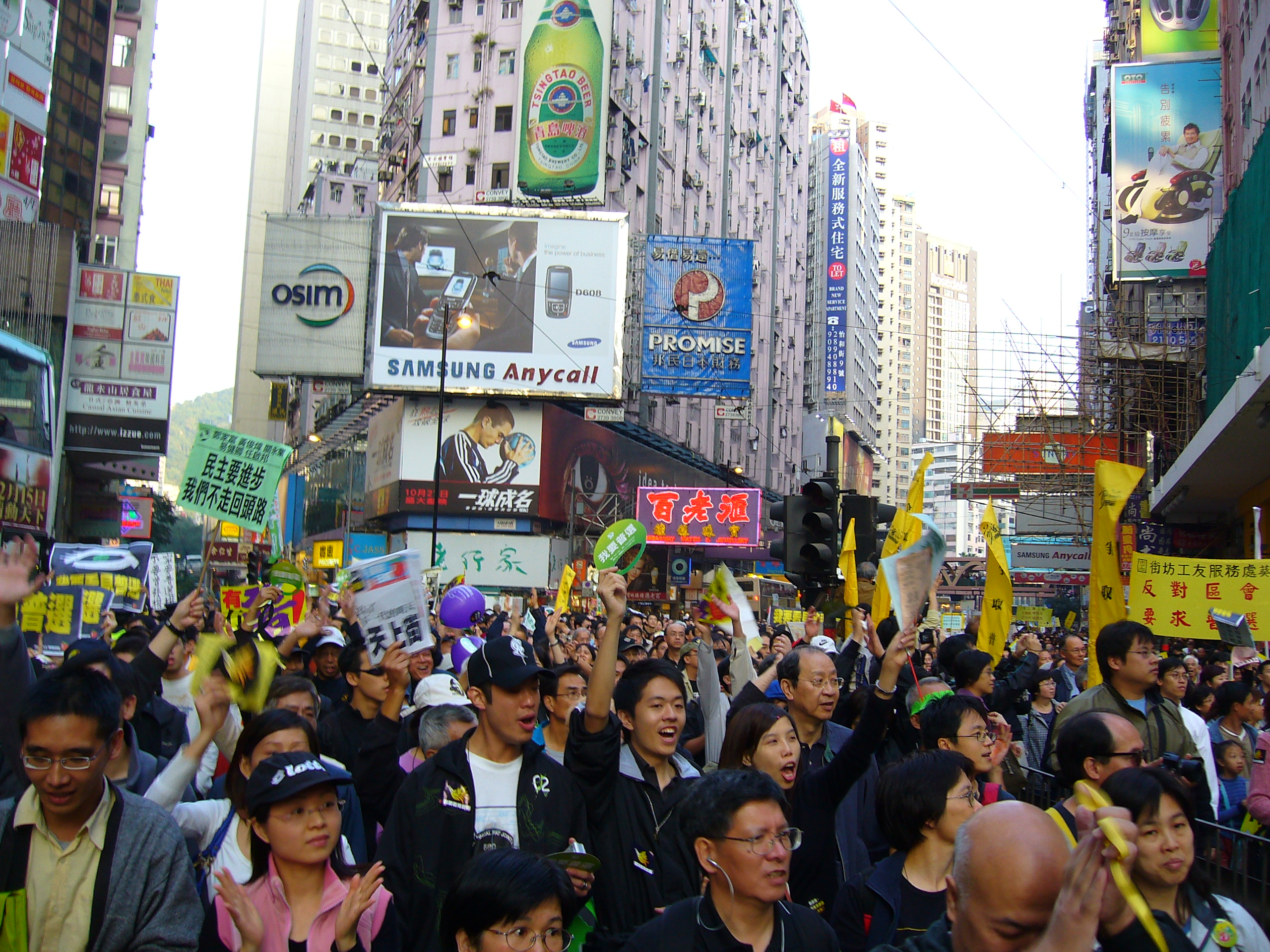
December 2005 protest for democracy in Hong Kong.

- Hong Kong Basic Law
  - Hong Kong Basic Law Article 23
  - Hong Kong Basic Law Article 45
  - Hong Kong Basic Law Article 46
  - Hong Kong Basic Law Article 69
  - Hong Kong Basic Law Annex Two
- Hong Kong trade mark law
- Hong Kong copyright law
- Legislation of the Provisional Government of Hong Kong
- Alcohol laws of Hong Kong
- Capital punishment in Hong Kong
- Constitution of Hong Kong
- Crime in Hong Kong
  - Organized crime in Hong Kong
  - Prostitution in Hong Kong
  - Human trafficking in Hong Kong
- Human rights in Hong Kong
  - Hong Kong Human Rights Monitor
  - Hong Kong 1 July marches
  - December 2005 protest for democracy in Hong Kong
  - Internet censorship in Hong Kong
  - LGBT rights in Hong Kong
  - Freedom of religion in Hong Kong
- Law enforcement in Hong Kong
  - Department of Justice
  - Hong Kong Police Force
    - Commissioner of Police: Stephen Lo Wai-chung

=== Military of Hong Kong ===
Military of Hong Kong

- Command
  - Commander of the People's Liberation Army Hong Kong Garrison
- Forces
  - People's Liberation Army Hong Kong Garrison
- Military history of Hong Kong

=== Local government in Hong Kong ===
Districts of Hong Kong

- District Councils of Hong Kong

18 districts of the Hong Kong Special Administrative Region of the People's Republic of China

District	Population (2021)	Area (km^{2})	Density (/km^{2})
Hong Kong (全港)	7 413 070	1080.18	6 801
Hong Kong Island (香港島)	1 195 529	79.68	14 957
Central and Western (中西區)	235 953	12.44	18 808
Wan Chai (灣仔)	166 695	9.83	15 791
Eastern (東區)	529 603	18.56	29 440
Southern (南區)	263 278	38.85	6 779
Kowloon (九龍)	2 232 339	46.93	47 557
Yau Tsim Mong (油尖旺)	310 647	6.99	44 458
Sham Shui Po (深水埗)	431 090	9.35	46 067
Kowloon City (九龍城)	410 634	10.02	40 994
Wong Tai Sin (黃大仙)	406 802	9.30	43 730
Kwun Tong (觀塘)	673 166	11.27	59 704
New Territories (新界)	3 984 077	953.48	4 137
Kwai Tsing (葵青)	495 798	23.34	21 246
Tsuen Wan (荃灣)	320 094	61.71	5 168
Tuen Mun (屯門)	506 879	82.89	5 908
Yuen Long (元朗)	668 080	138.46	4 825
North (北區)	309 631	136.61	2 269
Tai Po (大埔)	316 470	136.15	2 325
Sha Tin (沙田)	692 806	68.71	10 082
Sai Kung (西貢)	489 037	129.65	3 771
Islands (離島)	185 282	175.12	1 021

== History of Hong Kong ==
History of Hong Kong

- Military history of Hong Kong

== Culture of Hong Kong ==
Culture of Hong Kong

- LGBT culture in Hong Kong
  - LGBT history in Hong Kong
  - LGBT rights in Hong Kong
- Architecture of Hong Kong
- Cuisine of Hong Kong
- Languages of Hong Kong
- Media in Hong Kong
- National symbols of Hong Kong
  - Emblem of Hong Kong
  - Flag of Hong Kong
- People of Hong Kong
- Indonesians in Hong Kong
- Thais in Hong Kong
- Foreign domestic helpers in Hong Kong
- Prostitution in Hong Kong
- Public holidays in Hong Kong
- Religion in Hong Kong
  - Buddhism in Hong Kong
  - Christianity in Hong Kong
  - Hinduism in Hong Kong
  - Islam in Hong Kong
  - Judaism in Hong Kong
- World Heritage Sites in Hong Kong: None

=== Art in Hong Kong ===
- Art in Hong Kong see also category:Hong Kong artists.
- Cinema of Hong Kong
- Hong Kong Lesbian & Gay Film Festival
- Literature of Hong Kong
- Music of Hong Kong
- Television in Hong Kong

=== Sports in Hong Kong ===
Sports in Hong Kong

- Football in Hong Kong

== Economy and infrastructure of Hong Kong ==
Economy of Hong Kong

- Economic rank, by nominal GDP: 42nd (IMF 2022)
- Agriculture in Hong Kong
- Banking in Hong Kong
  - National Bank of Hong Kong
- Communications in Hong Kong
  - Internet in Hong Kong
- Companies of Hong Kong
- Currency of Hong Kong: Dollar
  - ISO 4217: HKD
- Energy in Hong Kong
- Health care in Hong Kong
- Mining in Hong Kong
- Hong Kong Stock Exchange
- Tourism in Hong Kong
- Transport in Hong Kong
  - Airports in Hong Kong
  - Rail transport in Hong Kong
  - Roads in Hong Kong
  - Taxicabs of Hong Kong
- Water supply and sanitation in Hong Kong

== Education in Hong Kong ==
Education in Hong Kong

== Health in Hong Kong ==
Health in Hong Kong

== See also ==
- Hong Kong–Taiwan relations
- Index of Hong Kong-related articles
- List of Hong Kong-related topics
- List of international rankings
- Outline of Asia
- Outline of China
- Outline of geography
- Place names of Hong Kong
