= International rankings of Brazil =

The following are international rankings of Brazil.

== Economy ==
- International Monetary Fund: GDP (nominal) 2012, ranked 7 out of 181 countries
- International Monetary Fund: GDP (nominal) per capita 2011, ranked 53 out of 183 countries
- The Wall Street Journal and The Heritage Foundation: Index of Economic Freedom 2006, ranked 81 out of 157 countries
- World Economic Forum: Global Competitiveness Index 2011-2012, ranked 53 out of 142 countries
- Motor Vehicle Production (OICA): ranked 6

== Environment ==
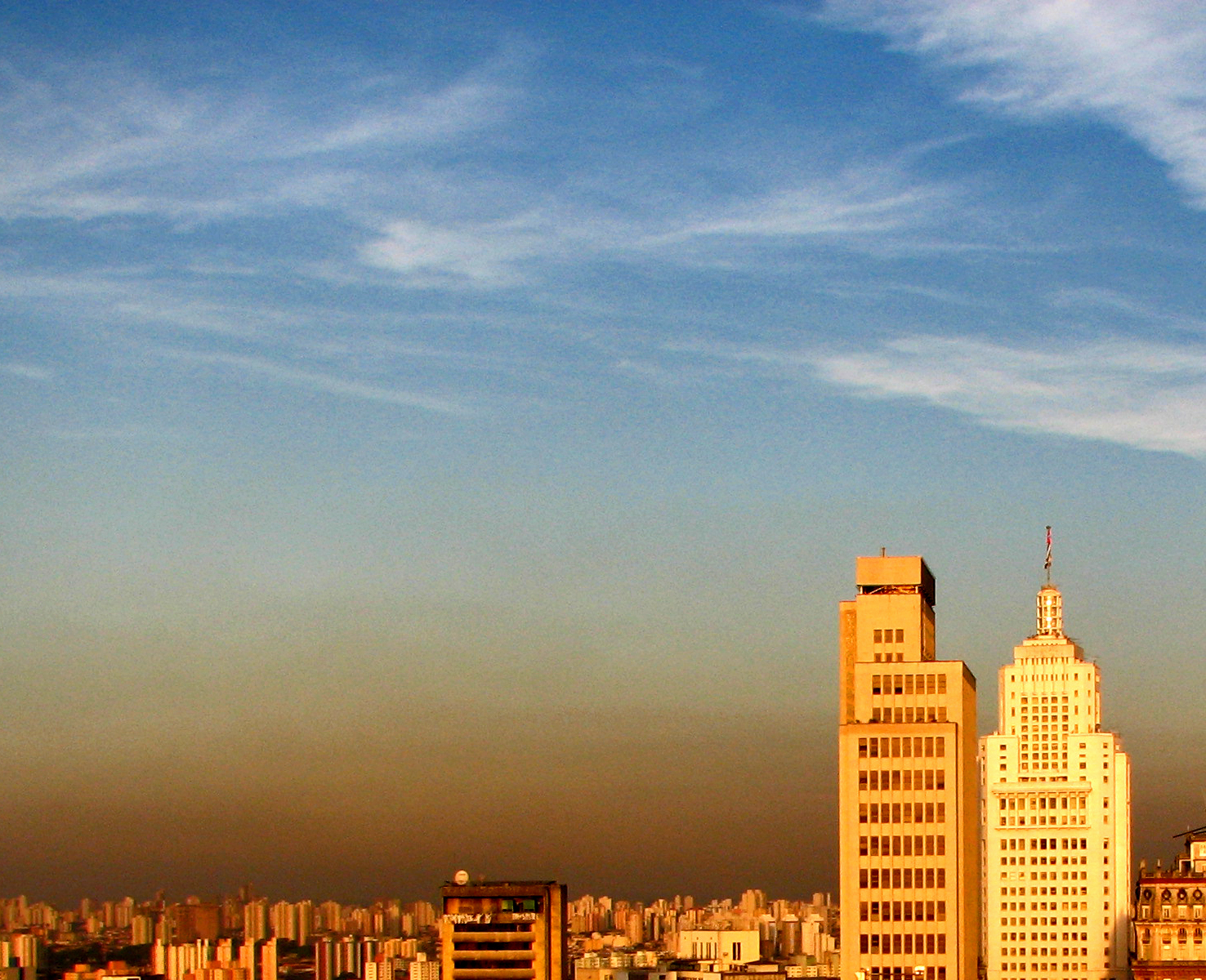
Smog in São Paulo

- Yale University and Columbia University: 2012 Environmental Performance Index, ranked 30 out of 132

== Globalization ==
- 2010 KOF Index of Globalization ranked 75 out of 181

== Military ==
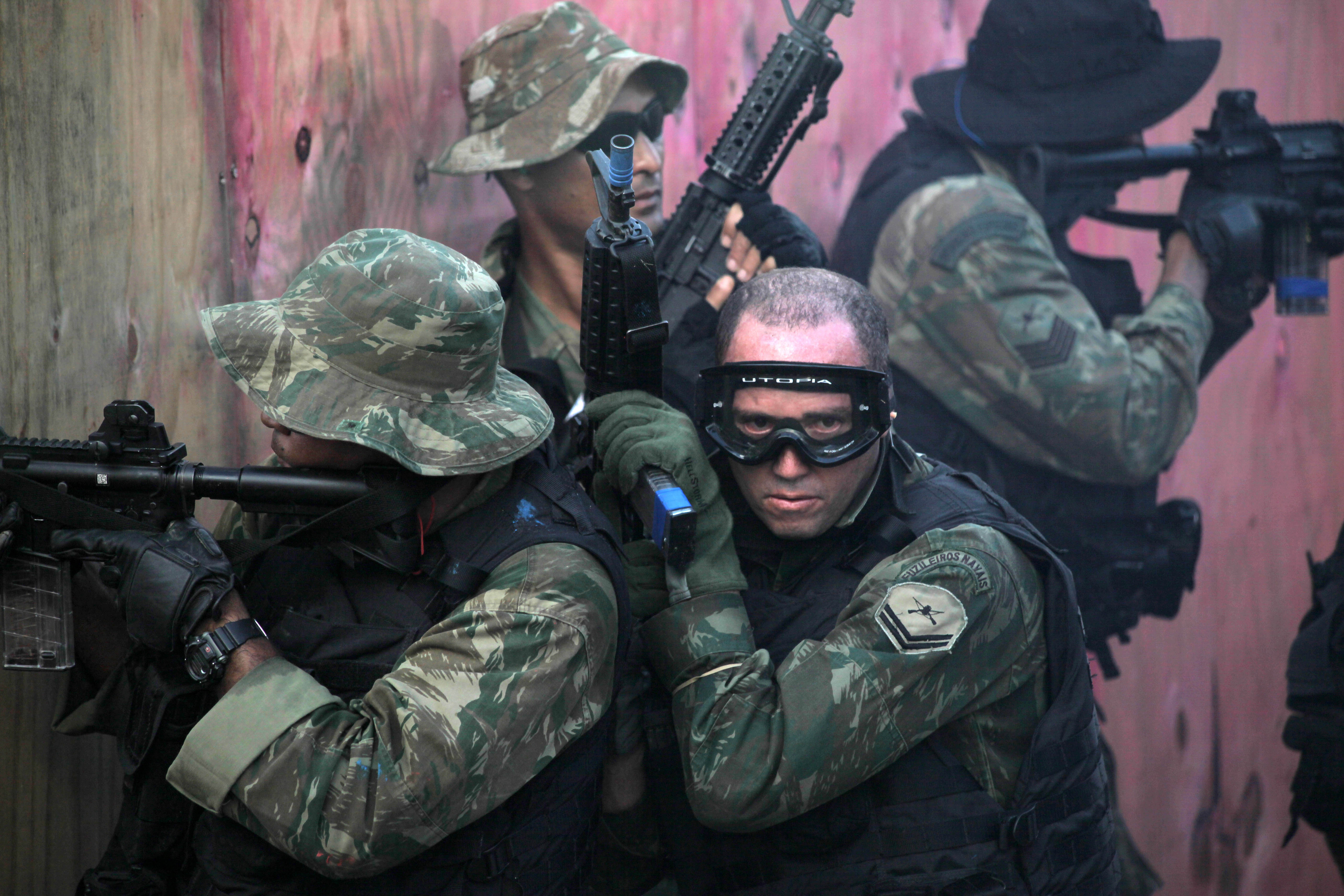
Members of the Brazilian Marine Corps Special Operations Battalion practice clearing a house

- Institute for Economics and Peace Global Peace Index ranked 85 out of 144

== Politics ==
- Transparency International: 2011 Corruption Perceptions Index, ranked 73 out of 182 countries
- Reporters Without Borders: 2011-2012 Press Freedom Index, ranked 99 out of 179 countries

== Technology ==
- Economist Intelligence Unit: E-readiness 2008, ranked 41 out of 70 countries
- Futron: Space Competitiveness Index 2010, ranked 10th in the world
- World Intellectual Property Organization: Global Innovation Index 2026, ranked 53 out of 139 countries

== Society ==
- United Nations: 2011 Human Development Index, ranked 84 out of 187 countries
