= E-readiness =

Preparedness for ICT capabilities

E-readiness refers to a country's capacity and state of preparedness to participate in the electronic world. The state of maturity is commonly measured by the country's information and communications technology (ICT) infrastructure and the ability of its government and citizens to use the positive impacts of ICT for sustainable development.

== Measures ==
The measures to evaluate the electronic preparedness may vary from country to country or even depending on the level of analysis to which one is interested (micro, meso, or macro,) considering not only the need to recognize the electronic preparedness of the country but also some specific environments/areas.

The common factors that are taken into consideration for measuring e-readiness of a country are:

- Information and communications technology (ICT) infrastructure.
- Degree of preparedness of a country's government, citizens, businesses, and NGOs to use ICT for sustainable development.
- Digital economy rankings

== See also ==
- e-Government
- ICT Development Index
