= India City Competitiveness Index =

This list ranks the top 50 most competitive cities in India as of the latest release by the Institute for Competitiveness in 2012. The list aligns with popular economist, Dr. Michael E Porter's Diamond Model for Competitiveness. Delhi topped the list followed by Mumbai, Chennai, Hyderabad and Kolkata.

== List ==
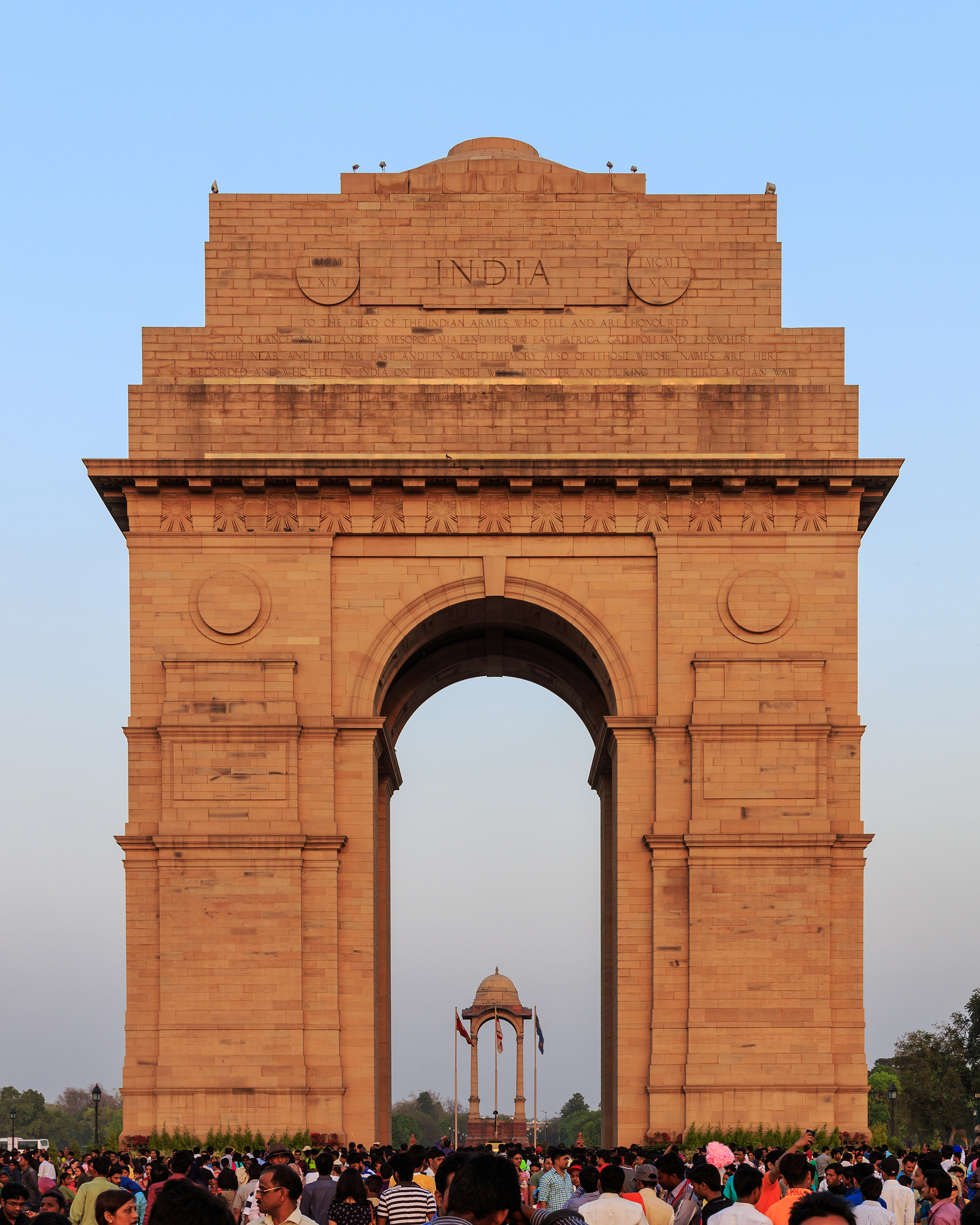
Delhi

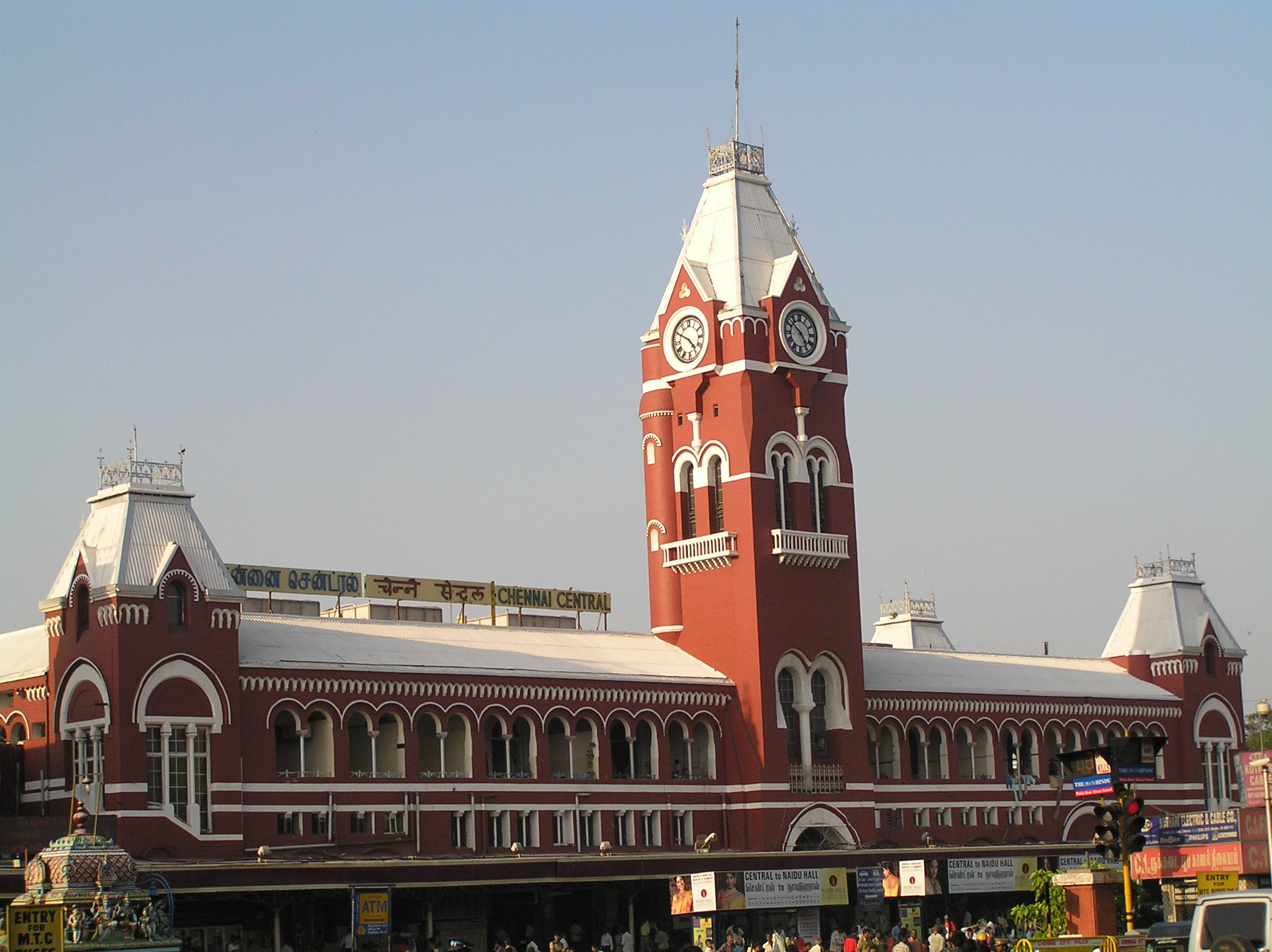
Chennai

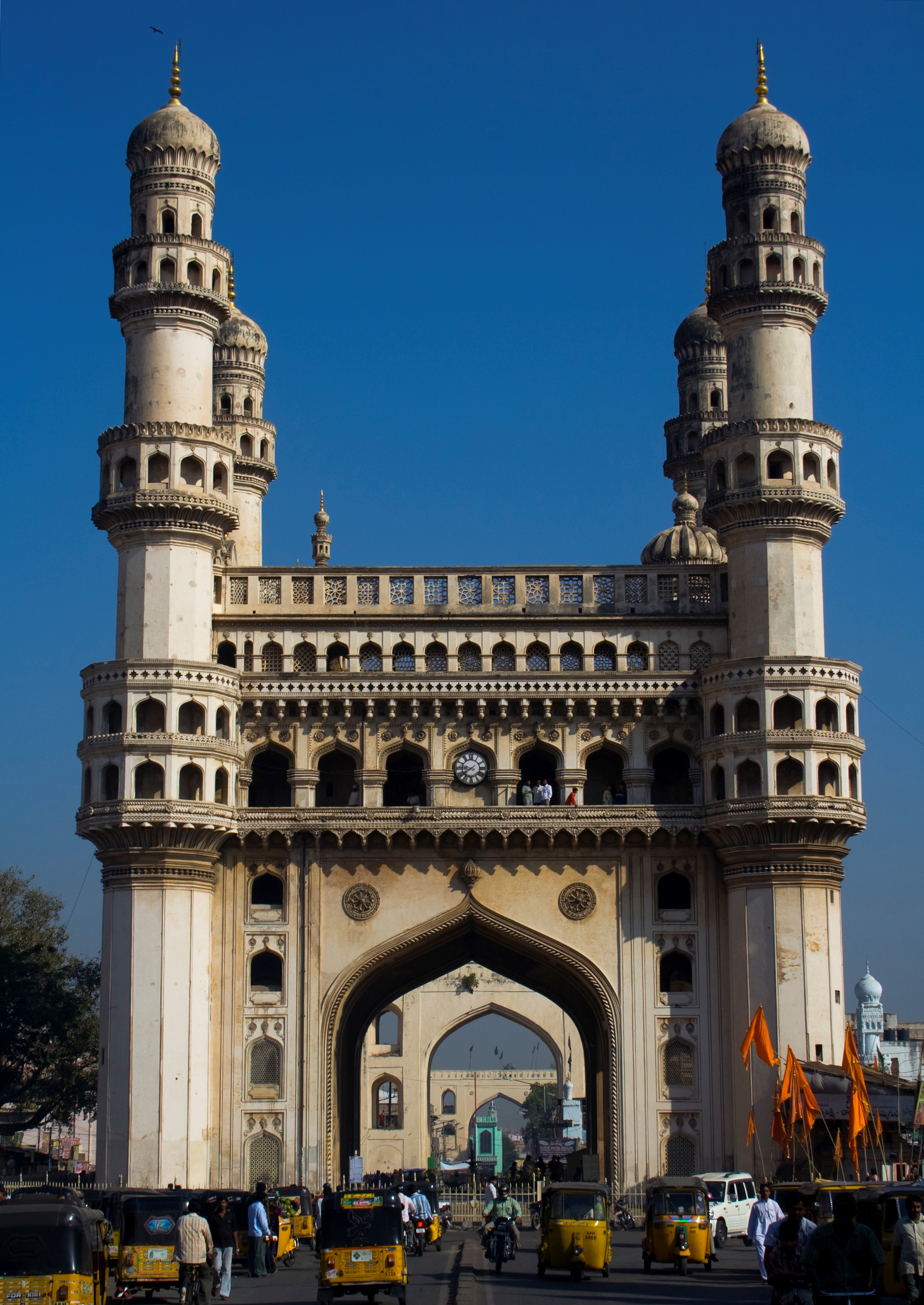
Hyderabad

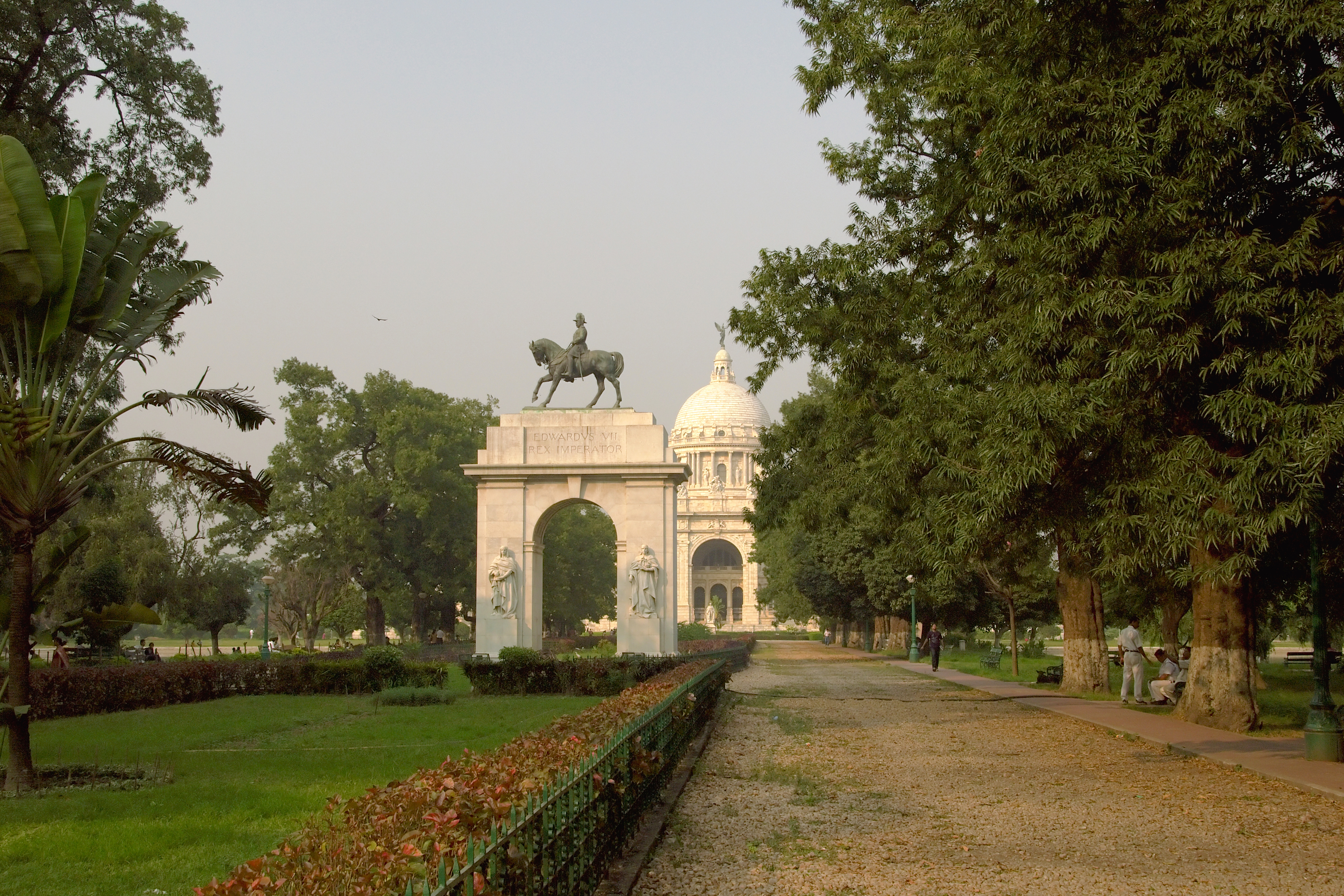
Kolkata

Sr No	City	State	Status
1	Delhi	Delhi	Capital
2	Mumbai	Maharashtra	State Capital
3	Chennai	Tamil Nadu	State Capital
4	Hyderabad	Telangana	State Capital
5	Kolkata	West Bengal	State Capital
6	Gurgaon	Haryana	Major City of the State
7	Bengaluru	Karnataka	State Capital
8	Noida	Uttar Pradesh	Major City of the State
9	Pune	Maharashtra	Major City of the State
10	Ahmedabad	Gujarat	Major City of the State
11	Nagpur	Maharashtra	Major City of the State
12	Chandigarh	Chandigarh	State Capital (Union Territory)
13	Jaipur	Rajasthan	State Capital
14	Coimbatore	Tamil Nadu	Major City of the State
15	Kochi	Kerala	Major City of the State
16	Surat	Gujarat	Major City of the State
17	Nashik	Maharashtra	Major City of the State
18	Indore	Madhya Pradesh	Major City of the State
19	Thiruvananthapuram	Kerala	State Capital
20	Kozhikode	Kerala	Major City of the State
21	Mangalore	Karnataka	Major City of the State
22	Bhubaneshwar	Orissa	State Capital
23	Vadodara	Gujarat	Major City of the State
24	Rajkot	Gujarat	Major City of the State
25	Lucknow	Uttar Pradesh	State Capital
26	Madurai	Tamil Nadu	Major City of the State
27	Bhopal	Madhya Pradesh	State Capital
28	Kanpur	Uttar Pradesh	Major City of the State
29	Faridabad	Haryana	Major City of the State
30	Ludhiana	Punjab	Major City of the State
31	Vijayawada	Andhra Pradesh	Major City of the State
32	Guwahati	Assam	Major City of the State
33	Raipur	Chhattisgarh	State Capital
34	Vishakhapatnam	Andhra Pradesh	Major City of the State
35	Patna	Bihar	State Capital
36	Jabalpur	Madhya Pradesh	Major City of the State
37	Agra	Uttar Pradesh	Major City of the State
38	Varanasi	Uttar Pradesh	Major City of the State
39	Meerut	Uttar Pradesh	Major City of the State
40	Pondicherry	Puducherry	Union Territory
41	Asansol	West Bengal	Major City of the State
42	Dehradun	Uttarakhand	State Capital
43	Ranchi	Jharkhand	State Capital
44	Allahabad	Uttar Pradesh	Major City of the State
45	Shimla	Himachal Pradesh	State Capital
46	Amritsar	Punjab	Major City of the State
47	Jammu	Jammu and Kashmir	Major City of the State
48	Jamshedpur	Jharkhand	Major City of the State
49	Dhanbad	Jharkhand	Major City of the State
50	Srinagar	Jammu and Kashmir	State Capital
51	Bareily	Uttar Pradesh	Major City of the State
52	Aligarh	Uttar Pradesh	Major City of the State
