= Digital economy rankings =

Digital economy rankings was published as a one-off exercise by the Economist Intelligence Unit as the follow-up to their previous e-readiness rankings. This was done to reflect the increasing influence of ICT in economic (and social) progress. The report was titled "Beyond e-readiness".

As of 2014, the Economist has not published a follow-up to the 2010 report, leaving it substantially outdated. A much more comprehensive and up-to-date index is the UN's ICT Development Index.

== See also ==
- e-Government
- ICT Development Index
