= Military history of Hong Kong =

The Military history of Hong Kong dates back to the Qin conquest. As Hong Kong is on the sea routes to the city of Guangzhou, the territories of Hong Kong served as an outer port. Amounts of pearl and salt are also located within the shores of Hong Kong as well. Thus, there is a long history of military and navy garrisoning the territory.

== Imperial China ==
Qin conquered southern China in 214 BCE, followed by the establishment kingdom of Nanyue. However, there are neither historical records nor archaeological finding on military in Hong Kong during this period.

The Empire of Han conquered the kingdom of Nanyue in 111 BCE. The extensive shore in the territories of Hong Kong attracted the government office to build fields for the production of salt. It is believed that there was military presence to guard against this important mineral though there is little evidence about it.

The Empire of Jin later rules the territories of Hong Kong. In 403, Lo Tun (盧循) occupies the city of Pun Yue, the present-day Guangzhou, and surrounding area. He led a fleet to attack Jin but deadly failed in 411. His followers occupied the Lantau Island.

In 621, the Empire of Tang finished conquest the southern China. The empire built a military and naval base in Tuen Mun to ensure the safety of Guangzhou and the seas around Hong Kong. The navy of Tuen Mun pacified the water against pirates.

== British force ==
Hong Kong has never had its own military forces because it has never been a sovereign state, except voluntary auxiliary force like The Royal Hong Kong Regiment (The Volunteers). All defence matters have been dependent on the state which controls Hong Kong. Before the British handover to PRC sovereignty, defence was provided by the British military, who stationed soldiers in barracks throughout Hong Kong, including the British Forces Overseas Hong Kong. Its finance was supported by the Hong Kong Government.

During the Japanese occupation of Hong Kong, the Hong Kong Defence Force was the main element of garrison. The other Japanese military units stationed in Hong Kong from early 1942 were the small Hong Kong Artillery Force and the Imperial Japanese Navy's Hong Kong Base Force, which formed part of the 2nd China Expeditionary Fleet.

== PRC PLA ==
The People's Republic of China's State Council assumed sovereignty over Hong Kong on 1 July 1997 and stationed a garrison of the People's Liberation Army (PLA) to manage its defence affairs. Although the garrison has little practical military value, the stationing of the PLA troops in Hong Kong is a significant symbol of the PRC government's assumption of sovereignty over Hong Kong.

According to Hong Kong's Basic Law, military forces stationed in Hong Kong shall not interfere with local civil affairs; the Hong Kong Government shall remain responsible for the maintenance of public order. The Hong Kong Garrison, composed of ground, naval, and air forces, is under the command of the Chinese Central Military Commission. The garrison subsequently opened its barracks on Stonecutters Island and Stanley to the public to promote understanding and trust between the troops and residents.
