= Space Competitiveness Index =

The Space Competitiveness Index (SCI) was a self-financed, independently researched, annual report that compared and ranked how countries invested in and benefited from the space industry. The report was published annually between 2008 and 2012 by Futron Corporation, a U.S. consulting firm.

The report grew over the years from the top 10 leading space markets in 2008 to 15 in 2012. While the full reports was available for purchase, the executive summary was distributed freely.

== Overview ==
Traditionally, the report included the top 10 leading markets which included Brazil, Canada, China, Europe, India, Israel, Japan, Russia, South Korea, and the United States. In the 2012, the report introduced 5 more countries which include Argentina, Australia, Iran, South Africa, and Ukraine. The report treats Europe as integrated whole.

A set of over 40 metrics that have the greatest economic determinants were compiled for each entity individually. The metrics were separated into three major areas:

- Government
- Human Capital
- Industry

== Report by year ==
=== 2008 ===
The 2008 report was the first edition of the Space Competitiveness Index. The report ranked the top 10 global space participant countries across over 40 greatest economic determinants metrics.

Total Aggregate Scores by Country:

1. United States 91.43
2. Europe 48.07
3. Russia 34.06
4. China 17.88
5. India 17.52
6. Canada 16.94
7. Japan 14.46
8. South Korea 8.89
9. Israel 8.38
10. Brazil 4.96

=== 2009 ===
The second edition of the report was able to contrast with the first edition. While the United States still led the index, they declined marginally based on increase by other countries.

Total Aggregate Scores by Country:

1. United States 90.32
2. Europe 46.81
3. Russia 32.44
4. Japan 21.17 (▲3)
5. China 19.46 (▼1)
6. Canada 18.13
7. India 15.33 (▼2)
8. South Korea 12.04
9. Israel 8.7
10. Brazil 7.09

=== 2010 ===
The 3rd edition continued to show decline from the dominant players and increase from the smaller countries. The report found that countries such as the U.S. and Canada has its technological leadership buoyed by the contribution of the industrial sector, which effectively markets, uses, and sells technology assets to government and commercial clients worldwide. Conversely, other countries such as China do not effectively leverage its high space technology achievement capability. some of the factors that influence that are government commercial policy and a limited private-sector industrial activity.

Total Aggregate Scores by Country:

1. United States
2. Europe
3. Russia
4. Japan
5. Canada (▲1)
6. India (▲1)
7. South Korea (▲1)
8. China (▼3)
9. Israel
10. Brazil

=== 2011 ===
In the 2011, while global activity overall increase, the dominant players continued to decrease for the fourth straight year as middle-tier nations ascend.

=== 2012 ===
The 2012 report marks the fifth anniversary edition of the study, which called for a half-decade review of international space trends based on quantitative and qualitative data. In the 2012 report, in addition to the 10 traditional leading markets, Futron included a second tier for emerging space leaders. The new tier, which is evaluate alongside the 10 original markets include Argentina, Australia, Iran, South Africa, and Ukraine. Brazil being surpassed by Australia. While the US remains the overall leader in space competitiveness its relative position has fallen for the fifth straight year as other countries enhance their capabilities. In contrast, other countries such as China, Japan, Russia and India have improved their space competitiveness by 41 percent, 37, 11 and 10 percent respectively since the first edition of the Space Competitiveness Index.

Total Aggregate Scores by Country:

1. United States 99.67
2. Europe 50.11
3. Japan 48.76
4. Russia 45.29
5. China 41.85
6. Canada 39.10
7. India 28.64
8. South Korea 15.22
9. Israel 9.30
10. Australia 5.22
