= IT industry competitiveness index =

Index published by the Business Software Association

The IT industry competitiveness index was an index published by the Business Software Alliance (BSA) in conjunction with The Economist that benchmarked 66 countries for their Information Technology industry. It was last published in 2011, where the United States ranked 1st, followed by Finland, Singapore, Sweden, and the United Kingdom.

It measured factors like business environment, IT infrastructure, human capital, legal framework, Research and Development, and government support.

It was first published by the BSA in 2007 and the last version was published was in 2011.
