= ICT Development Index =

Index published by the UN International Telecommunication Union

The ICT Development Index (IDI) is an index published by the United Nations International Telecommunication Union based on internationally agreed information and communication technologies (ICT) indicators. This makes it a valuable tool for benchmarking the most important indicators for measuring the information society. The IDI is a standard tool that governments, operators, development agencies, researchers and others can use to measure the digital divide and compare ICT performance within and across countries.

Having the role to analyze the level of development of the information and communication technology sector (ICT), the ICT Development Index (IDI) is a composite indicator published by ITU between 2009 and 2017. It was discontinued in 2018, owing to issues of data availability and quality. In October 2022, ITU’s Plenipotentiary Conference 2022 in Bucharest adopted a revised text of Resolution 131, which defines, inter alia, the main features of the process for developing and adopting a new IDI methodology and of the IDI itself. In November 2023, the revised IDI methodology was approved by the Member States and is valid for four years. In December 2023, the 2023 edition of the IDI based on the new methodology was released. The 2024 edition of the IDI was released in June 2024.

== List of countries by ICT Development Index (IDI) ==
The following table shows the most recent values of the ICT Development Index, based on data published by International Telecommunication Union in 2024. Sorting is alphabetical by country code, according to ISO 3166-1 alpha-3.

Country/Territory	Aggregate Scores (0-100)				IDI 2024 Indicator values (2022)										Normalized Progress Scores (0-100)									
Country/Territory	ICT Development Index (IDI)		Universal Connectivity Pillar	Meaningful Connectivity Pillar	Individuals using the Internet (Note: Proportion of individuals who used the Internet from any location in the last three months. The Internet is a worldwide public computer network. It provides access to a number of communication services including the World Wide Web and carries e-mail, news, entertainment and data files, irrespective of the device used (not assumed to be only via a computer − it may also be by mobile telephone, tablet, PDA, games machine, digital TV etc.). Access can be via a fixed or mobile network.)	Households with Internet access at home (Note: Proportion of households with Internet access at home. Internet access at home means that the Internet is generally available for use by all members of the household at any time, regardless of whether it is actually used. The connection and devices may or may not be owned by the household but should be considered household assets. If one member of the household has a mobile phone with connection to the Internet and makes it available for all members, then it should be considered that the household has access to the Internet. An Internet connection in the household should be working at the time of the survey.)	Active mobile-broadband subscriptions per 100 inhabitants (Note: Active mobile-broadband subscriptions per 100 inhabitants. Active mobile-broadband subscriptions refers to the sum of standard mobile-broadband and dedicated mobile-broadband subscriptions to the public Internet. It covers actual subscribers, not potential subscribers, even though the latter may have broadband enabled-handsets. Subscriptions must include a recurring subscription fee or if in the prepayment modality, pass a usage requirement – users must have accessed the Internet in the last three months.)	Population covered by at least a 3G mobile network (Note: Percentage of the population covered by at least a 3G mobile network refers to the percentage of inhabitants that are within range of at least a 3G mobile-cellular signal, irrespective of whether or not they are subscribers. This is calculated by dividing the number of inhabitants that are covered by at least a 3G mobile-cellular signal by the total population and multiplying by 100.)	Population covered by at least a 4G/LTE mobile network (Note: Percentage of the population covered by at least a 4G/LTE mobile network refers to the percentage of inhabitants that live within range of LTE/LTE-Advanced, mobile WiMAX/WirelessMAN or other more advanced mobile-cellular networks, irrespective of whether or not they are subscribers. This is calculated by dividing the number of inhabitants that are covered by the previously mentioned mobile-cellular technologies by the total population and multiplying by 100. It excludes people covered only by HSPA, UMTS, EV-DO and previous 3G technologies, and also excludes fixed WiMAX coverage.)	Mobile broadband Internet traffic per subscription (Note: Mobile broadband Internet traffic per mobile-broadband subscription (GB). Mobile-broadband Internet traffic (within the country) refers to broadband traffic volumes originated within the country from 3G networks or other more advanced mobile-networks, including 3G upgrades, evolutions or equivalent standards in terms of data transmission speeds. Traffic should be collected and aggregated at the country level for all 3G or more advanced mobile networks within the country. Download and upload traffic should be added up and reported together. Traffic should be measured at the end-user access point. Wholesale and walled-garden traffic should be excluded. The indicator is calculated by dividing mobile-broadband Internet traffic (within the country) by active mobile-broadband subscriptions.)	Fixed broadband Internet traffic per subscription (Note: Fixed broadband Internet traffic per fixed broadband subscription (GB). Fixed (wired)- broadband Internet traffic refers to traffic generated by fixed-broadband subscribers measured at the end-user access point. It should be measured by adding up download and upload traffic. This should exclude wholesale traffic, walled garden, IPTV and cable TV traffic. The indicator is calculated by dividing fixed-broadband Internet traffic by total fixed broadband subscriptions.)	Mobile data and voice high-consumption basket price (Note: Mobile-broadband data and voice high-consumption basket price as a percentage of GNI per capita (p.c.). The basket refers to the cheapest mobile broadband plan (and add-on) providing at least 2 GB of monthly data using at least 3G technology, 140 minutes of voice and 70 SMSs. See ITU ICT price statistics website for detailed data collection rules.)	Fixed-broadband Internet basket price (Note: Entry-level fixed-broadband basket price as percentage of GNI per capita. The basket is composed of the cheapest plan providing at least 5GB of monthly high-speed data (256Kbit/s or higher) from the operator with the largest market share in each economy. See ITU ICT price statistics website for detailed data collection rules.)	Individuals who own a mobile phone (Note: Proportion of individuals who own a mobile phone. An individual owns a mobile cellular phone if he/she has a mobile cellular phone device with at least one active SIM card for personal use. It includes mobile cellular phones supplied by employers that can be used for personal reasons (to make personal calls, access the Internet, etc.) and those who have a mobile phone for personal use that is not registered under his/her name. It excludes individuals who have only active SIM card(s) and not a mobile phone device.)	Individuals using the Internet	Households with Internet access at home	Active mobile-broadband subscriptions per 100 inhabitants	3G and 4G/LTE Network Coverage	Mobile broadband Internet traffic per subscription	Fixed broadband Internet traffic per subscription	Mobile data and voice high-consumption basket price	Fixed-broadband Internet basket price	Individuals who own a mobile phone	
Country/Territory	Value	Change	Universal Connectivity Pillar	Meaningful Connectivity Pillar	%	%		%	%	GB	GB	% of GNI per capita	% of GNI per capita	%	%	%		%	GB	GB	% of GNI per capita	% of GNI per capita	%	
Country/Territory	Afghanistan	33.1	▲ ^{(4.2)}	27.5	38.6	N/A	N/A	55.5	58.0 (Note: Lagged value from 2021.)	26.0	9.8	N/A	21.1	15.0	N/A	N/A	N/A	37.0	38.8	38.3	N/A	1.2	56.8	N/A
Angola	49.9	▲ ^{(5.8)}	35.3	64.5	39.3 (Note: ITU estimate.)	44.6	26.3	87.2	57.9	18.6	861.3	4.5	12.2	45.6	41.4	47.0	17.5	69.6	47.8	73.4	82.8	65.4	48.0	
Albania	84.7	▲ ^{(3.1)}	79.1	90.3	82.6	96.5	75.3	99.0	99.0	86.2	1734.8	1.5	1.3	88.2	87.0	100.0	50.2	99.0	71.9	81.0	97.8	99.2	92.8	
Andorra	88.8	▲ ^{(1.6)}	87.6	90.0	94.5	98.9	95.2	99.5	97.0	28.1	3172.8	0.5	0.8	96.6	99.5	100.0	63.5	98.0	54.2	87.5	100.0	100.0	100.0	
United Arab Emirates	97.5	▲ ^{(1.1)}	100.0	94.9	100.0	100.0	234.9	100.0	99.8	100.1	6614.6	1.1	0.7	100.0	100.0	100.0	100.0	99.9	74.3	95.5	99.8	100.0	100.0	
Argentina	83.4	▲ ^{(1.9)}	79.5	87.3	88.4	92.1	72.9	98.5	97.7	47.5	N/A	0.6	5.7	89.3	93.0	97.0	48.6	98.0	62.4	N/A	100.0	85.6	94.0	
Armenia	86.4	▲ ^{(1.3)}	81.2	91.6	77.0	89.7	102.1	100.0	100.0	91.6	5207.7	0.9	4.2	89.0	81.1	94.4	68.0	100.0	72.9	92.9	100.0	90.1	93.7	
Antigua and Barbuda	79.7	—	71.7	87.8	87.1	84.4	51.8	99.0	99.0	N/A	N/A	3.1	5.0	94.3	91.7	88.8	34.5	99.0	N/A	N/A	89.5	87.6	99.3	
Australia	95.1	▲ ^{(1.1)}	94.7	95.4	94.9	97.0	126.4	99.8	99.7	161.7	4516.3	0.5	1.2	97.3	99.9	100.0	84.3	99.8	81.9	91.4	100.0	99.4	100.0	
Austria	94.3	▲ ^{(1.8)}	92.5	96.1	93.6	93.2	121.3	98.0	98.0	354.0	2276.4	0.2	0.7	97.0	98.5	98.1	80.9	98.0	94.5	83.9	100.0	100.0	100.0	
Azerbaijan	80.4	▲ ^{(1.4)}	77.7	83.1	86.0	86.5	77.1	99.8	94.0	35.1	314.8	1.8	1.8	84.0	90.5	91.1	51.4	96.3	57.7	62.5	96.0	97.7	88.4	
Burundi	24.4	▲ ^{(1.4)}	12.6	36.1	11.3	19.5	8.3	50.6	32.2	85.7	1396.2	53.1	N/A	25.6	11.9	20.5	5.6	39.6	71.8	78.6	0.0	N/A	26.9	
Belgium	89.3	▲ ^{(1.1)}	87.2	91.4	94.0	94.4	94.9	100.0	100.0	63.2	2952.4	0.6	0.7	90.0	99.0	99.4	63.3	100.0	67.0	86.8	100.0	100.0	94.8	
Benin	45.4	▲ ^{(7.1)}	37.1	53.7	33.8	45.4	42.2	80.0	46.0	36.1	790.1	12.6	23.0	53.9	35.5	47.7	28.1	59.6	58.1	72.5	43.2	32.0	56.8	
Burkina Faso	30.1	▲ ^{(1.6)}	25.5	34.7	19.9	14.1	60.9	53.2	36.6	1.3	N/A	18.3	31.1	58.2	21.0	14.8	40.6	43.2	13.5	N/A	15.0	6.9	61.3	
Bangladesh	62.0	▲ ^{(0.9)}	39.4	84.5	38.9	38.1	55.9	98.5	98.5	78.7	1195.5	1.4	1.5	61.8	41.0	40.1	37.3	98.5	70.4	77.0	98.0	98.3	65.1	
Bulgaria	88.7	▲ ^{(3.1)}	84.1	93.4	79.1	87.3	115.6	100.0	99.9	102.0	3139.7	0.9	1.5	95.7	83.3	91.9	77.1	99.9	74.6	87.4	100.0	98.4	100.0	
Bahrain	97.5	▲ ^{(1.0)}	100.0	95.1	100.0	100.0	157.6	100.0	100.0	316.9	3092.5	1.7	3.0	100.0	100.0	100.0	100.0	100.0	92.7	87.3	96.6	93.9	100.0	
Bahamas	89.3	▲ ^{(0.8)}	86.1	92.5	94.4	88.6	98.5	98.0	95.0	139.1	1928.1	1.1	1.6	94.5	99.4	93.3	65.7	96.2	79.5	82.1	99.6	98.2	99.4	
Bosnia and Herzegovina	78.6	▲ ^{(2.0)}	68.7	88.6	78.8	75.9	64.9	99.0	99.0	42.0	N/A	2.3	2.1	89.1	83.0	80.0	43.3	99.0	60.5	N/A	93.5	96.6	93.8	
Belarus	88.5	▲ ^{(1.6)}	84.5	92.6	89.5	89.5	97.8	99.9	98.0	143.5	1502.1	1.6	0.7	97.0	94.2	94.2	65.2	98.8	80.0	79.4	97.2	100.0	100.0	
Bolivia	69.4	▲ ^{(1.4)}	62.4	76.5	66.0	56.9	86.7	87.8	74.5	N/A	N/A	7.4	8.3	83.0	69.5	59.9	57.8	79.8	N/A	N/A	68.7	77.4	87.4	
Brazil	82.0	▲ ^{(0.1)}	77.1	87.0	80.5	80.2	93.1	92.4	92.4	48.2	1674.1	0.9	3.1	88.1	84.8	84.5	62.0	92.4	62.7	80.6	100.0	93.7	92.7	
Barbados	77.5	▲ ^{(0.2)}	70.1	85.0	76.2	82.4	64.8	100.0	99.0	38.1	N/A	3.6	3.6	84.3	80.2	86.7	43.2	99.4	59.0	N/A	87.3	92.1	88.7	
Brunei	95.7	▲ ^{(0.9)}	93.1	98.4	99.0	96.7	118.8	98.6	98.6	610.0	4995.7	0.7	1.2	98.1	100.0	100.0	79.2	98.6	100.0	92.5	100.0	99.4	100.0	
Bhutan	85.9	▲ ^{(9.4)}	85.2	86.6	85.6	99.6	98.0	97.0	97.0	170.9	246.4	2.2	2.9	87.2	90.1	100.0	65.3	97.0	82.8	59.8	94.2	94.2	91.8	
Botswana	78.7	▲ ^{(4.7)}	78.7	78.8	77.3	78.3	108.2	98.0	91.0	21.8	767.8	3.2	10.1	90.8	81.4	82.5	72.1	93.8	50.3	72.1	89.2	71.9	95.5	
Canada	88.6	▲ ^{(1.4)}	84.3	93.0	94.0	96.1	81.0	99.7	99.5	64.2	4427.6	0.9	1.1	96.4	99.0	100.0	54.0	99.6	67.2	91.2	100.0	99.9	100.0	
Switzerland	92.4	▲ ^{(0.8)}	89.9	94.9	95.6	96.2	104.6	100.0	100.0	204.2	2194.0	0.7	0.8	97.8	100.0	100.0	69.8	100.0	85.6	83.5	100.0	100.0	100.0	
Chile	91.7	▲ ^{(1.0)}	88.4	95.0	90.7	91.9	109.5	95.0	89.0	230.7	5606.5	0.8	1.8	94.8	95.5	96.7	73.0	91.4	87.6	93.7	100.0	97.4	99.8	
China	85.8	▲ ^{(1.4)}	79.0	92.6	75.6	81.2	107.8	99.9	99.9	174.8	2575.1	1.0	0.5	83.0	79.6	85.5	71.9	99.9	83.2	85.3	100.0	100.0	87.4	
Ivory Coast	65.3	▲ ^{(6.3)}	58.0	72.5	38.4	68.9	91.4	97.2	91.1	29.8	1787.2	5.9	13.0	63.1	40.4	72.6	60.9	93.5	55.1	81.3	76.0	62.9	66.4	
Cameroon	44.2	▲ ^{(7.4)}	40.3	48.1	43.9	48.1	36.0	70.0	70.0	4.2	230.9	15.9	19.8	60.9	46.2	50.7	24.0	70.0	26.6	59.1	26.6	41.9	64.1	
Democratic Republic of the Congo	31.0	▲ ^{(1.9)}	24.6	37.4	27.2	N/A	26.2	55.0	45.0	18.7	N/A	31.0	N/A	49.4	28.7	N/A	17.5	49.0	48.0	N/A	0.0	N/A	52.0	
Republic of the Congo	30.7	▲ ^{(1.5)}	30.7	30.6	36.2	N/A	15.8	87.0	85.0	0.3	0.0	15.6	31.0	55.6	38.2	N/A	10.5	85.8	3.6	0.2	28.0	7.2	58.6	
Colombia	73.2	▲ ^{(1.3)}	63.3	83.1	72.8	59.5	76.2	100.0	99.8	72.6	265.9	1.5	3.8	75.8	76.6	62.6	50.8	99.9	69.2	60.7	97.5	91.3	79.8	
Comoros	46.5	▲ ^{(3.0)}	45.7	47.4	N/A	N/A	61.5	87.0	85.0	20.9	19.1	14.1	29.2	N/A	N/A	N/A	41.0	85.8	49.7	32.6	35.6	12.9	N/A	
Cape Verde	69.1	▲ ^{(1.0)}	68.4	69.8	72.1	75.7	74.6	93.8	80.2	60.2	2172.0	20.1	2.9	79.4	75.9	79.7	49.7	85.7	66.2	83.4	6.0	94.3	83.5	
Costa Rica	84.8	▲ ^{(0.9)}	79.6	89.9	82.6	83.3	96.6	89.0	91.0	66.2	3075.1	1.0	1.6	91.6	87.0	87.6	64.4	90.2	67.7	87.2	100.0	98.0	96.4	
Cuba	55.3	—	44.0	66.7	71.1	33.3	33.1	73.0	49.2	45.8	491.6	8.4	6.8	63.0	74.9	35.1	22.1	58.7	61.9	67.3	63.6	82.1	66.3	
Cyprus	88.6	▲ ^{(33.3)}	83.6	93.7	89.6	94.0	86.1	100.0	100.0	108.4	2997.6	0.5	0.9	98.0	94.3	98.9	57.4	100.0	75.5	86.9	100.0	100.0	100.0	
Czech Republic	88.0	▲ ^{(0.6)}	83.0	93.0	84.5	85.4	105.0	99.8	99.8	79.6	3253.6	0.9	1.0	98.8	89.0	89.9	70.0	99.8	70.6	87.8	100.0	100.0	100.0	
Germany	87.8	▲ ^{(1.7)}	85.5	90.2	91.6	91.4	95.5	99.9	99.9	84.3	3225.1	0.3	1.0	77.9	96.5	96.2	63.7	99.9	71.5	87.7	100.0	100.0	82.0	
Djibouti	61.6	▼ ^{(−25.7)}	54.7	68.5	65.0	68.4	35.6	90.0	76.0	19.0	816.3	10.4	8.8	74.4	68.5	72.0	23.7	81.6	48.2	72.8	54.0	75.9	78.3	
Dominica	78.4	▲ ^{(14.8)}	72.2	84.5	83.4	79.5	67.8	100.0	100.0	N/A	N/A	5.9	5.6	88.4	87.8	83.7	45.2	100.0	N/A	N/A	76.1	85.9	93.0	
Denmark	97.1	▲ ^{(20.2)}	98.4	95.9	97.9	95.2	142.7	100.0	100.0	190.6	4260.7	0.4	0.7	97.9	100.0	100.0	95.1	100.0	84.5	90.7	100.0	100.0	100.0	
Dominican Republic	75.4	▼ ^{(−21.5)}	62.0	88.8	85.2	46.1	71.6	98.7	97.6	135.5	5757.4	3.3	2.7	74.4	89.7	48.5	47.8	98.0	79.1	94.0	88.6	94.9	78.4	
Algeria	80.9	▲ ^{(5.9)}	75.4	86.3	71.2	80.6	99.7	98.1	85.9	78.5	1948.4	2.4	3.9	85.9	75.0	84.9	66.5	90.8	70.4	82.3	93.0	91.1	90.4	
Ecuador	70.0	▼ ^{(−7.8)}	58.9	81.1	69.7	60.4	59.4	95.7	93.9	63.6	2323.9	3.0	4.7	58.8	73.4	63.6	39.6	94.6	67.0	84.2	90.3	88.4	61.9	
Egypt	76.8	▲ ^{(8.6)}	65.4	88.1	72.2	73.2	64.8	99.7	98.0	40.4	1413.8	1.6	2.8	97.4	76.0	77.1	43.2	98.7	59.9	78.8	97.1	94.5	100.0	
Spain	92.5	▲ ^{(16.7)}	91.1	93.9	94.5	96.1	110.8	99.7	99.7	117.7	3617.3	1.3	1.3	99.2	99.5	100.0	73.9	99.7	76.8	89.0	98.6	99.2	100.0	
Estonia	97.9	▲ ^{(6.5)}	98.6	97.3	91.0	95.0	209.6	100.0	99.0	246.5	N/A	0.5	0.8	98.6	95.8	100.0	100.0	99.4	88.7	N/A	100.0	100.0	100.0	
Ethiopia	39.8	▼ ^{(−57.1)}	18.6	61.0	16.7	19.4	26.9	98.5	33.0	19.8	1400.6	4.9	16.3	43.9	17.6	20.4	17.9	59.2	48.8	78.7	80.7	52.5	46.2	
Fiji	73.2	—	72.5	73.9	81.9	76.3	76.4	96.0	80.0	N/A	N/A	10.4	4.7	85.0	86.2	80.3	50.9	86.4	N/A	N/A	53.6	88.5	89.4	
Finland	98.1	▲ ^{(64.3)}	99.3	96.9	93.0	97.6	160.5	100.0	100.0	443.2	2199.0	0.7	0.9	98.2	97.9	100.0	100.0	100.0	98.1	83.6	100.0	100.0	100.0	
France	89.8	▼ ^{(−6.9)}	84.3	95.3	85.3	87.3	107.0	99.0	99.0	160.6	N/A	0.6	1.2	94.9	89.8	91.8	71.3	99.0	81.8	N/A	100.0	99.4	99.9	
Gabon	74.7	▲ ^{(1.5)}	74.3	75.2	73.7	78.3	94.4	98.0	98.0	N/A	N/A	2.9	7.2	84.6	77.6	82.4	62.9	98.0	N/A	N/A	90.7	80.7	89.0	
United Kingdom	93.6	▲ ^{(4.2)}	92.2	94.9	95.3	96.4	115.1	99.9	99.9	111.9	5716.5	0.4	1.2	95.9	100.0	100.0	76.7	99.9	76.0	93.9	100.0	99.5	100.0	
Georgia	87.8	▲ ^{(14.9)}	83.0	92.6	78.7	88.4	109.5	100.0	99.7	107.6	3534.2	1.2	2.4	91.9	82.9	93.0	73.0	99.8	75.4	88.7	99.2	95.8	96.8	
Ghana	66.2	▼ ^{(−26.6)}	57.9	74.5	68.6	53.2	68.4	95.8	67.7	61.3	1335.7	3.7	12.8	69.8	72.2	56.0	45.6	78.9	66.5	78.2	86.5	63.6	73.5	
Guinea-Bissau	36.9	▼ ^{(−48.2)}	32.4	41.3	31.6	21.3	62.5	48.0	23.0	19.8	N/A	8.0	67.0	57.9	33.2	22.4	41.7	33.0	48.8	N/A	65.7	0.0	61.0	
Equatorial Guinea	44.8	▼ ^{(−21.1)}	40.7	48.8	66.8	48.7	0.9	65.0	65.0	384.3	0.0	N/A	12.9	65.3	70.3	51.2	0.6	65.0	95.8	0.3	N/A	63.3	68.7	
Greece	86.5	▲ ^{(53.4)}	81.4	91.7	83.2	85.5	100.1	99.7	99.2	94.8	2175.9	1.4	1.9	93.3	87.6	90.0	66.7	99.4	73.4	83.4	98.3	97.3	98.2	
Grenada	78.6	▲ ^{(41.0)}	73.8	83.4	79.9	82.0	76.6	98.5	98.5	N/A	N/A	5.2	4.9	85.7	84.1	86.3	51.1	98.5	N/A	N/A	79.5	88.0	90.3	
Guatemala	51.7	▼ ^{(−32.0)}	32.2	71.2	50.8	30.0	17.0	95.0	89.0	N/A	N/A	3.1	6.3	63.5	53.5	31.6	11.4	91.4	N/A	N/A	89.6	83.7	66.9	
Hong Kong	97.4	▲ ^{(24.0)}	100.0	94.8	95.6	96.1	158.0	99.0	99.0	137.0	4174.0	0.2	0.5	98.2	100.0	100.0	100.0	99.0	79.3	90.5	100.0	100.0	100.0	
Honduras	60.9	▲ ^{(6.1)}	48.0	73.7	59.7	45.5	49.8	86.2	86.2	132.9	1408.7	9.5	12.8	72.9	62.9	47.9	33.2	86.2	78.8	78.7	58.4	63.6	76.8	
Croatia	89.6	▼ ^{(−6.9)}	86.9	92.3	82.1	85.5	126.5	99.9	99.7	206.4	3120.7	0.5	0.5	76.8	86.4	90.0	84.3	99.8	85.8	87.4	100.0	100.0	80.8	
Hungary	87.4	▲ ^{(31.1)}	81.5	93.3	89.1	91.4	81.6	99.2	99.2	133.8	2035.5	1.1	0.7	94.5	93.8	96.3	54.4	99.2	78.9	82.7	99.5	100.0	99.5	
Indonesia	82.8	▼ ^{(−4.3)}	79.6	86.0	66.5	86.5	116.5	96.5	96.5	91.0	6267.6	1.7	6.1	67.9	70.0	91.1	77.7	96.5	72.7	94.9	96.5	84.1	71.5	
Ireland	90.7	▲ ^{(3.9)}	92.8	88.6	95.6	94.5	118.6	95.0	90.0	52.7	1189.2	0.4	1.5	96.6	100.0	99.5	79.1	92.0	64.1	76.9	100.0	98.6	100.0	
Iran	82.2	▲ ^{(2.1)}	81.2	83.3	78.6	79.5	115.6	85.0	81.0	103.3	457.4	N/A	N/A	72.4	82.7	83.7	77.1	82.6	74.8	66.5	N/A	N/A	76.2	
Iraq	73.9	▼ ^{(−15.0)}	69.0	78.8	78.7	88.7	46.2	98.2	96.6	9.7	1694.2	2.6	N/A	65.7	82.9	93.4	30.8	97.2	38.2	80.7	92.4	N/A	69.2	
Iceland	95.9	▲ ^{(15.0)}	94.7	97.0	99.7	98.4	126.1	100.0	100.0	270.0	5353.6	0.4	1.4	98.7	100.0	100.0	84.1	100.0	90.1	93.2	100.0	98.8	100.0	
Israel	92.5	▲ ^{(23.0)}	90.0	95.0	91.9	86.2	123.6	99.0	97.0	162.4	N/A	0.3	0.9	98.8	96.7	90.7	82.4	97.8	82.0	N/A	100.0	100.0	100.0	
Italy	87.7	▼ ^{(−7.1)}	80.3	95.0	85.1	83.1	95.9	100.0	100.0	189.1	2707.6	0.6	1.0	95.6	89.5	87.5	63.9	100.0	84.4	85.8	100.0	100.0	100.0	
Jamaica	76.9	▼ ^{(−14.2)}	70.2	83.7	82.4	75.4	66.7	99.0	99.0	37.1	5744.7	5.8	8.9	93.7	86.7	79.3	44.5	99.0	58.6	94.0	76.3	75.5	98.6	
Jordan	84.9	▼ ^{(−1.5)}	79.1	90.6	90.5	92.2	67.6	99.8	99.8	234.2	4133.2	3.5	6.7	91.1	95.3	97.1	45.1	99.8	87.8	90.4	87.5	82.3	95.9	
Japan	93.2	▲ ^{(16.2)}	94.6	91.9	84.9	89.5	234.4	99.9	96.6	82.9	2781.3	1.5	1.1	93.8	89.4	94.3	100.0	97.9	71.3	86.1	97.6	99.8	98.8	
Kazakhstan	90.1	▲ ^{(11.6)}	87.1	93.0	92.3	96.2	96.2	97.7	87.3	229.2	1982.7	1.1	0.6	92.7	97.2	100.0	64.1	91.5	87.5	82.4	99.3	100.0	97.6	
Kenya	58.5	▼ ^{(−33.5)}	45.0	72.0	40.8	50.2	59.0	98.0	97.0	36.9	1950.5	6.0	16.6	63.2	43.0	52.8	39.4	97.4	58.5	82.3	75.6	51.7	66.5	
Kyrgyzstan	88.3	▼ ^{(−0.6)}	94.1	82.5	79.8	93.4	175.3	98.0	96.9	37.6	377.1	2.7	6.2	94.2	84.0	98.3	100.0	97.3	58.8	64.4	91.5	83.8	99.1	
Cambodia	72.6	▲ ^{(18.4)}	62.8	82.5	56.7	57.7	102.0	92.1	92.1	212.8	N/A	3.1	11.6	77.3	59.7	60.7	68.0	92.1	86.3	N/A	89.7	67.2	81.4	
Kiribati	52.1	▼ ^{(−32.6)}	51.7	52.5	54.4	62.2	48.4	73.0	64.0	43.5	N/A	15.1	N/A	67.3	57.3	65.5	32.3	67.6	61.0	N/A	30.9	N/A	70.8	
Saint Kitts and Nevis	84.9	▲ ^{(16.4)}	79.8	90.0	76.5	86.5	101.7	100.0	100.0	N/A	N/A	2.5	3.2	89.1	80.5	91.0	67.8	100.0	N/A	N/A	92.8	93.3	93.8	
South Korea	94.4	▲ ^{(48.9)}	93.4	95.5	97.2	100.0	120.1	99.9	99.9	168.8	4131.7	0.8	1.0	97.2	100.0	100.0	80.1	99.9	82.6	90.4	100.0	99.9	100.0	
Kuwait	100.0	▲ ^{(17.7)}	100.0	99.9	99.7	99.4	151.5	100.0	100.0	664.5	10003.1	0.7	1.2	99.2	100.0	100.0	100.0	100.0	100.0	100.0	100.0	99.4	100.0	
Laos	65.3	▼ ^{(−28.5)}	59.6	71.0	62.0	72.0	56.4	85.0	52.0	42.0	532.6	8.2	7.2	82.7	65.3	75.8	37.6	65.2	60.5	68.2	64.5	80.7	87.1	
Liberia	37.1	—	33.5	40.8	30.1	N/A	41.2	76.0	67.0	28.2	N/A	27.1	N/A	50.5	31.7	N/A	27.5	70.6	54.3	N/A	0.0	N/A	53.2	
Libya	88.1	▲ ^{(8.7)}	88.2	87.9	88.4	N/A	125.6	93.5	90.0	N/A	N/A	1.2	0.9	89.1	93.1	N/A	83.7	91.4	N/A	N/A	99.0	100.0	93.8	
Saint Lucia	73.9	▲ ^{(0.6)}	66.8	81.0	74.2	83.4	51.8	100.0	96.0	N/A	N/A	5.4	4.7	77.5	78.1	87.8	34.5	97.6	N/A	N/A	78.4	88.5	81.6	
Liechtenstein	92.3	▲ ^{(0.4)}	94.1	90.4	96.8	95.0	123.6	99.0	98.3	26.9	4109.9	0.2	0.4	96.8	100.0	100.0	82.4	98.6	53.5	90.4	100.0	100.0	100.0	
Sri Lanka	71.3	▲ ^{(1.4)}	58.3	84.3	44.5	61.7	94.9	97.0	97.0	79.6	429.6	0.7	0.8	68.6	46.8	65.0	63.3	97.0	70.6	65.9	100.0	100.0	72.2	
Lesotho	48.8	▲ ^{(4.5)}	32.7	64.9	47.0	N/A	67.1	95.8	85.1	5.6	439.8	11.7	6.1	N/A	49.5	N/A	44.8	89.4	30.4	66.1	47.6	84.2	N/A	
Lithuania	94.2	▲ ^{(1.8)}	91.2	97.3	87.7	87.7	133.3	100.0	100.0	297.4	N/A	0.4	0.8	95.7	92.3	92.3	88.8	100.0	91.7	N/A	100.0	100.0	100.0	
Luxembourg	92.6	▲ ^{(0.5)}	92.4	92.8	98.2	97.6	115.7	100.0	100.0	100.7	N/A	0.2	0.7	98.6	100.0	100.0	77.1	100.0	74.4	N/A	100.0	100.0	100.0	
Latvia	94.3	▲ ^{(0.5)}	90.7	97.8	91.0	91.4	120.1	99.0	95.0	486.0	4727.8	0.4	1.4	96.7	95.8	96.2	80.1	96.6	99.5	91.9	100.0	98.9	100.0	
Macau	94.1	▲ ^{(0.8)}	95.9	92.3	88.5	89.9	174.5	99.8	99.8	52.8	N/A	0.3	0.8	94.6	93.1	94.7	100.0	99.8	64.1	N/A	100.0	100.0	99.6	
Morocco	86.8	▲ ^{(1.7)}	81.9	91.7	89.9	87.4	88.6	99.5	99.4	130.4	3129.5	2.3	3.8	96.5	94.6	92.0	59.1	99.4	78.5	87.4	93.7	91.2	100.0	
Monaco	92.6	—	89.6	95.5	98.4	99.1	103.4	100.0	100.0	192.7	3394.0	0.3	0.2	96.4	100.0	100.0	68.9	100.0	84.7	88.3	100.0	100.0	100.0	
Moldova	78.3	▲ ^{(1.2)}	65.2	91.4	63.5	67.5	86.5	99.9	99.2	91.8	N/A	0.9	2.0	89.1	66.9	71.1	57.6	99.5	72.9	N/A	100.0	96.9	93.8	
Madagascar	29.9	▲ ^{(3.5)}	18.0	41.8	20.6	15.6	24.1	67.2	27.3	17.9	4590.3	15.5	92.6	38.1	21.7	16.4	16.1	43.3	47.3	91.6	28.5	0.0	40.1	
Maldives	81.5	▲ ^{(2.5)}	73.6	89.5	83.9	91.9	53.6	100.0	100.0	53.4	2489.2	2.5	2.5	96.0	88.3	96.7	35.7	100.0	64.3	84.9	92.4	95.2	100.0	
Mexico	80.7	▲ ^{(2.7)}	72.5	88.8	78.6	68.5	94.0	96.1	95.3	64.7	4444.7	1.2	2.1	79.2	82.8	72.1	62.7	95.6	67.3	91.2	98.9	96.5	83.4	
North Macedonia	82.0	▲ ^{(2.4)}	74.0	89.9	84.2	82.6	69.7	99.9	99.6	91.0	2568.3	2.2	3.2	89.7	88.7	86.9	46.4	99.7	72.7	85.2	94.3	93.1	94.4	
Mali	40.4	▲ ^{(2.2)}	39.7	41.1	33.1	43.0	58.5	70.0	53.0	N/A	N/A	17.0	24.1	67.3	34.8	45.2	39.0	59.8	N/A	N/A	21.3	28.6	70.8	
Malta	93.5	▲ ^{(6.5)}	92.4	94.6	91.5	93.4	123.7	100.0	100.0	122.4	N/A	0.5	0.9	96.2	96.4	98.3	82.5	100.0	77.5	N/A	100.0	100.0	100.0	
Myanmar	63.8	▼ ^{(−1.9)}	65.8	61.8	N/A	N/A	97.1	95.4	94.3	0.6	87.6	4.9	15.3	N/A	N/A	N/A	64.7	94.8	7.1	48.7	80.7	55.6	N/A	
Montenegro	87.9	▲ ^{(4.0)}	82.1	93.6	88.2	81.0	102.5	98.0	97.9	161.7	2644.6	1.0	1.7	93.7	92.9	85.2	68.4	97.9	81.9	85.6	99.8	97.7	98.7	
Mongolia	87.0	▲ ^{(1.1)}	82.9	91.1	81.6	80.0	117.6	100.0	99.0	120.2	1678.3	1.9	1.7	91.3	85.9	84.2	78.4	99.4	77.2	80.6	95.7	97.8	96.1	
Mozambique	32.0	▲ ^{(6.2)}	18.1	46.0	21.2	15.6	23.2	85.0	60.0	39.0	N/A	18.7	33.7	77.3	22.3	16.4	15.4	70.0	59.3	N/A	12.9	0.0	81.4	
Mauritania	55.5	▲ ^{(1.8)}	52.6	58.5	44.4	N/A	73.4	43.9	34.7	44.2	1657.2	8.6	19.2	61.3	46.7	N/A	49.0	38.4	61.3	80.5	62.4	43.7	64.5	
Mauritius	84.2	▲ ^{(2.5)}	78.4	89.9	75.5	73.8	117.3	99.0	99.0	66.9	2297.3	1.4	1.4	87.0	79.5	77.6	78.2	99.0	67.9	84.0	98.1	98.7	91.6	
Malawi	33.1	▲ ^{(1.6)}	23.5	42.7	27.7	14.9	38.3	85.9	70.2	16.7	117.3	14.9	63.7	47.5	29.1	15.7	25.6	76.5	46.2	51.8	31.6	0.0	50.1	
Malaysia	95.0	▲ ^{(0.5)}	95.0	95.0	97.4	96.0	127.4	96.9	96.9	269.4	3342.6	1.1	2.5	98.2	100.0	100.0	84.9	96.9	90.1	88.1	99.8	95.4	100.0	
Namibia	68.8	▲ ^{(0.7)}	61.2	76.3	62.2	63.2	77.4	89.0	79.0	11.0	N/A	2.6	8.7	79.6	65.5	66.6	51.6	83.0	40.0	N/A	92.3	76.2	83.8	
Nigeria	46.9	▲ ^{(2.7)}	34.9	58.8	35.5	37.9	41.4	86.8	80.9	5.7	9.4	3.5	19.3	78.5	37.3	39.9	27.6	83.2	30.6	25.4	87.5	43.3	82.6	
Nicaragua	61.6	▲ ^{(5.5)}	52.0	71.3	61.1	46.5	64.0	85.0	72.9	51.6	646.2	6.1	12.5	72.8	64.3	49.0	42.7	77.8	63.8	70.3	75.1	64.3	76.6	
Netherlands	92.5	▼ ^{(−1.0)}	93.2	91.7	92.5	95.6	123.3	99.0	99.0	75.5	N/A	0.5	1.1	87.4	97.4	100.0	82.2	99.0	69.8	N/A	100.0	99.8	92.0	
Norway	93.4	▲ ^{(2.5)}	92.7	94.2	99.0	99.0	117.1	99.9	99.9	119.9	N/A	0.4	1.1	96.0	100.0	100.0	78.0	99.9	77.1	N/A	100.0	99.6	100.0	
New Zealand	90.3	▲ ^{(0.8)}	88.0	92.5	95.7	98.0	96.2	98.5	97.5	60.3	4402.2	0.5	0.8	95.8	100.0	100.0	64.1	97.9	66.2	91.1	100.0	100.0	100.0	
Oman	91.7	▲ ^{(1.2)}	92.4	91.0	97.8	97.1	115.9	100.0	99.0	73.0	4157.2	2.0	3.7	97.8	100.0	100.0	77.3	99.4	69.2	90.5	95.1	91.8	100.0	
Pakistan	55.6	▲ ^{(6.9)}	36.7	74.4	32.9	39.0	51.5	79.9	76.4	82.8	2175.3	1.5	12.7	50.3	34.7	41.0	34.4	77.8	71.2	83.4	97.5	63.7	52.9	
Panama	77.6	▲ ^{(2.8)}	76.2	79.0	73.6	82.3	96.9	95.0	84.0	N/A	N/A	1.9	3.8	88.8	77.5	86.7	64.6	88.4	N/A	N/A	95.7	91.5	93.5	
Peru	76.4	▲ ^{(3.0)}	64.5	88.3	74.7	55.2	85.3	86.6	81.2	140.6	N/A	1.4	3.0	84.9	78.6	58.1	56.9	83.4	79.7	N/A	98.1	93.8	89.4	
Philippines	74.4	▲ ^{(9.4)}	67.2	81.7	75.2	76.9	62.4	96.0	80.0	99.6	N/A	2.3	11.3	80.7	79.2	81.0	41.6	86.4	74.2	N/A	93.5	68.2	84.9	
Poland	95.8	▲ ^{(1.2)}	96.6	94.9	86.9	93.3	202.7	100.0	100.0	99.0	6729.9	0.5	1.1	95.7	91.5	98.2	100.0	100.0	74.1	95.7	100.0	99.7	100.0	
Portugal	87.4	▲ ^{(1.8)}	81.9	92.9	84.5	88.2	95.7	100.0	100.0	86.5	2946.7	0.7	1.5	97.1	88.9	92.8	63.8	100.0	71.9	86.7	100.0	98.5	100.0	
Paraguay	74.1	▲ ^{(2.4)}	60.2	88.0	76.3	50.4	71.0	98.4	97.6	N/A	N/A	3.0	4.0	85.0	80.3	53.1	47.3	98.0	N/A	N/A	90.0	90.7	89.5	
Qatar	97.8	▲ ^{(0.5)}	100.0	95.6	100.0	96.2	174.0	100.0	99.8	138.4	7980.4	0.3	2.0	99.6	100.0	100.0	100.0	99.9	79.4	97.6	100.0	96.9	100.0	
Romania	87.6	▲ ^{(0.6)}	82.2	93.0	85.5	89.4	93.6	100.0	98.6	100.5	2467.2	0.6	0.6	98.0	90.0	94.1	62.4	99.2	74.3	84.8	100.0	100.0	100.0	
Russia	90.6	▲ ^{(1.7)}	86.7	94.4	90.4	86.6	110.9	96.6	92.6	220.6	2540.2	0.7	0.7	98.8	95.2	91.1	73.9	94.2	86.9	85.1	100.0	100.0	100.0	
Rwanda	46.8	▲ ^{(6.7)}	33.1	60.5	34.4	21.9	60.1	98.8	98.8	15.5	5429.8	7.1	41.6	53.3	36.3	23.1	40.1	98.8	45.1	93.4	69.9	0.0	56.1	
Saudi Arabia	95.7	▲ ^{(0.8)}	94.7	96.8	100.0	100.0	126.0	100.0	100.0	420.7	6888.8	1.3	4.5	100.0	100.0	100.0	84.0	100.0	97.2	96.0	98.3	89.3	100.0	
Senegal	69.3	▲ ^{(2.8)}	64.2	74.3	60.0	60.8	98.1	99.4	95.4	35.9	1533.7	5.5	17.8	81.0	63.1	64.0	65.4	97.0	58.1	79.7	77.9	48.1	85.3	
Singapore	97.8	▲ ^{(0.4)}	100.0	95.6	96.0	98.7	163.6	100.0	100.0	95.1	N/A	0.3	0.6	98.8	100.0	100.0	100.0	100.0	73.5	N/A	100.0	100.0	100.0	
Sierra Leone	34.3	—	23.6	45.1	30.4	23.4	21.2	79.9	48.6	N/A	N/A	26.2	N/A	40.8	32.0	24.6	14.2	61.1	N/A	N/A	0.0	N/A	43.0	
El Salvador	66.1	—	49.3	82.9	62.9	30.2	74.9	92.0	76.0	N/A	N/A	2.9	6.7	81.0	66.2	31.8	49.9	82.4	N/A	N/A	90.7	82.5	85.3	
San Marino	92.7	—	92.9	92.5	85.1	93.1	136.7	99.0	99.0	69.6	3114.8	0.5	0.9	97.0	89.5	98.0	91.1	99.0	68.5	87.3	100.0	100.0	100.0	
Somalia	28.7	▲ ^{(7.3)}	15.1	42.3	27.6	13.9	2.5	70.0	30.0	N/A	N/A	5.3	80.0	26.6	29.1	14.6	1.7	46.0	N/A	N/A	78.7	0.0	28.1	
Serbia	87.7	▲ ^{(2.6)}	82.9	92.5	83.5	83.2	109.5	99.5	98.7	114.6	2185.8	0.9	2.3	95.5	87.9	87.6	73.0	99.0	76.4	83.5	100.0	95.9	100.0	
São Tomé and Príncipe	55.9	▲ ^{(1.4)}	50.4	61.4	57.0	61.0	40.6	95.0	0.0	19.3	2885.2	7.8	15.6	70.0	60.0	64.3	27.1	38.0	48.4	86.5	66.7	54.9	73.7	
Suriname	82.5	▲ ^{(5.7)}	82.4	82.7	75.8	80.2	124.4	95.0	82.0	681.2	N/A	7.6	3.6	89.0	79.8	84.4	82.9	87.2	100.0	N/A	67.4	91.9	93.7	
Slovakia	87.1	^{(0.0)}	81.6	92.6	87.2	90.3	86.7	99.0	99.0	104.0	2229.2	1.4	0.9	97.7	91.8	95.1	57.8	99.0	74.9	83.7	98.2	100.0	100.0	
Slovenia	90.8	▲ ^{(2.4)}	85.0	96.5	88.9	92.6	96.0	99.8	99.8	157.2	10323.5	0.4	1.8	97.8	93.6	97.5	64.0	99.8	81.5	100.0	100.0	97.6	100.0	
Sweden	95.3	▲ ^{(1.4)}	95.3	95.4	95.0	92.7	132.4	100.0	100.0	214.8	N/A	0.5	1.1	88.5	100.0	97.6	88.3	100.0	86.5	N/A	100.0	99.6	93.2	
Eswatini	70.4	▼ ^{(−1.3)}	68.1	72.8	58.3	63.8	113.5	99.1	81.0	6.9	N/A	4.7	13.4	87.1	61.3	67.2	75.7	88.2	33.2	N/A	82.1	61.7	91.7	
Seychelles	84.7	▲ ^{(3.8)}	81.8	87.7	86.7	83.5	99.2	99.0	99.0	84.9	851.5	4.3	1.1	93.7	91.2	87.9	66.2	99.0	71.6	73.3	83.9	99.6	98.7	
Syria	59.6	▲ ^{(10.0)}	38.7	80.5	N/A	N/A	21.9	98.9	75.7	97.8	N/A	5.9	1.1	N/A	N/A	N/A	14.6	85.0	73.9	N/A	75.9	99.7	N/A	
Chad	21.3	▲ ^{(1.3)}	6.7	35.9	12.2	4.7	3.4	68.0	36.0	34.5	N/A	38.6	N/A	38.9	12.8	4.9	2.3	48.8	57.4	N/A	0.0	N/A	41.0	
Togo	46.2	▲ ^{(6.0)}	39.9	52.4	37.6	52.2	38.0	99.0	96.0	19.2	3281.5	17.4	32.6	56.6	39.6	54.9	25.3	97.2	48.4	87.9	19.3	2.1	59.6	
Thailand	91.0	▲ ^{(2.3)}	89.7	92.4	88.0	90.4	121.8	98.8	98.1	275.5	3816.6	2.9	3.5	88.3	92.6	95.2	81.2	98.4	90.4	89.5	90.6	92.4	92.9	
Timor-Leste	39.2	▲ ^{(0.2)}	40.2	38.2	40.8	N/A	29.9	96.5	45.0	N/A	N/A	18.6	30.3	65.4	42.9	N/A	19.9	65.6	N/A	N/A	13.6	9.3	68.8	
Tonga	58.2	^{(0.0)}	45.5	70.9	57.5	33.8	60.7	99.0	96.0	2.0	343.4	3.1	3.6	62.4	60.6	35.6	40.5	97.2	17.6	63.4	89.6	92.0	65.7	
Trinidad and Tobago	78.8	▲ ^{(2.2)}	68.2	89.3	79.0	80.6	54.7	100.0	94.0	126.2	3702.0	2.7	3.4	83.9	83.2	84.8	36.5	96.4	77.9	89.2	91.5	92.7	88.3	
Tunisia	77.2	▲ ^{(1.8)}	65.0	89.5	73.8	57.0	85.8	99.0	95.0	77.3	2570.6	1.5	2.6	87.9	77.7	60.0	57.2	96.6	70.2	85.3	97.4	95.0	92.5	
Turkey	87.5	▲ ^{(1.7)}	81.0	94.1	83.4	94.1	84.0	99.8	99.5	153.5	2621.2	0.8	1.3	94.3	87.8	99.1	56.0	99.6	81.1	85.5	100.0	99.1	99.3	
Tanzania	43.1	▲ ^{(5.9)}	29.3	57.0	31.9	33.4	28.6	85.0	58.0	40.3	9.0	6.9	20.7	74.5	33.6	35.2	19.0	68.8	59.8	25.0	71.1	38.9	78.4	
Uganda	40.4	▲ ^{(5.6)}	32.7	48.1	10.0	N/A	54.4	85.0	31.0	15.3	697.3	10.9	50.5	65.0	10.5	N/A	36.2	52.6	44.9	71.1	51.4	0.0	68.4	
Ukraine	81.0	▲ ^{(0.2)}	74.6	87.3	79.2	82.7	80.1	91.0	91.0	N/A	N/A	1.5	1.9	90.7	83.4	87.0	53.4	91.0	N/A	N/A	97.7	97.3	95.5	
Uruguay	89.9	▲ ^{(2.8)}	89.3	90.5	89.9	91.1	115.8	93.7	93.7	126.3	2922.9	2.7	2.3	92.3	94.6	95.9	77.2	93.7	78.0	86.7	91.7	96.0	97.2	
United States	96.7	▲ ^{(0.1)}	99.0	94.4	97.1	92.2	173.5	99.6	99.5	114.6	N/A	0.7	0.9	96.0	100.0	97.1	100.0	99.5	76.4	N/A	100.0	100.0	100.0	
Uzbekistan	84.9	▲ ^{(3.2)}	86.5	83.3	83.9	95.5	106.7	96.0	85.0	50.9	439.4	1.0	1.7	79.0	88.3	100.0	71.2	89.4	63.5	66.1	99.9	97.8	83.2	
Saint Vincent and the Grenadines	70.7	▼ ^{(−2.3)}	67.3	74.1	77.7	77.1	58.5	100.0	90.0	N/A	N/A	6.3	6.7	90.3	81.8	81.2	39.0	94.0	N/A	N/A	74.0	82.3	95.1	
Venezuela	67.7	▲ ^{(3.5)}	63.4	72.0	N/A	N/A	52.1	82.0	65.0	26.9	1755.1	5.1	13.5	N/A	N/A	N/A	34.8	71.8	53.5	81.1	79.7	61.4	N/A	
Vietnam	85.0	▲ ^{(4.4)}	79.1	90.8	78.6	85.5	96.9	99.9	99.9	113.5	4079.8	0.9	2.6	79.3	82.7	90.0	64.6	99.9	76.3	90.3	100.0	94.9	83.5	
Vanuatu	70.2	▲ ^{(2.3)}	82.2	58.3	69.9	69.3	324.8	70.0	70.0	13.9	1004.6	7.5	30.0	79.0	73.6	72.9	100.0	70.0	43.4	75.1	68.2	10.2	83.2	
West Bank and Gaza Strip (Note: Palestine is not an ITU Member State; the status of Palestine in ITU is the subject of Resolution 99 (Rev. Dubai, 2018) of the ITU Plenipotentiary Conference.)	69.3	▲ ^{(2.0)}	68.4	70.3	88.6	92.3	21.9	58.3	0.0	85.6	5028.8	7.6	6.6	79.2	93.3	97.2	14.6	23.3	71.8	92.5	67.8	82.7	83.4	
Samoa	67.8	▲ ^{(4.7)}	61.0	74.7	75.3	77.1	33.7	99.0	99.0	N/A	N/A	5.3	15.1	82.7	79.3	81.2	22.4	99.0	N/A	N/A	78.8	56.4	87.1	
Yemen	43.5	—	24.7	62.4	17.7	N/A	29.2	73.7	45.0	9.2	1440.6	6.1	4.0	34.6	18.6	N/A	19.5	56.5	37.3	79.0	74.7	90.6	36.4	
South Africa	83.6	▲ ^{(3.1)}	82.6	84.6	74.7	75.3	135.1	99.9	98.5	32.2	2983.5	3.5	3.9	81.9	78.6	79.3	90.0	99.0	56.3	86.9	87.8	91.1	86.3	
Zambia	55.6	▲ ^{(6.1)}	39.3	71.8	31.2	45.9	55.3	95.5	91.2	38.9	704.0	3.8	14.7	60.6	32.9	48.3	36.8	92.9	59.3	71.2	86.1	57.6	63.8	
Zimbabwe	47.7	▲ ^{(5.0)}	44.9	50.6	32.6	57.6	59.6	84.3	40.1	11.7	1117.5	28.6	9.5	52.3	34.3	60.6	39.7	57.8	40.9	76.2	0.0	73.8	55.0	
Note (ITU World Telecommunication): The reference year is 2022, unless otherwise indicated.
