= International rankings of Thailand =

The following are international rankings of Thailand.

== General ==
- Human Development Index (2021): Thailand ranked 66 of 191 countries.
- Satisfaction with Life Index: Ranked 76 of 178 countries.
- Where-to-be-born Index: Thailand ranked 50 of 80 countries.

== Aging ==
- Thailand in 2012 ranked number three of 66 nations with the most rapidly aging populations (1=most rapidly aging, 66=least rapidly aging).
- The Global AgeWatch Index for 2015 ranked Thailand 34 of 96 nations (1=best, 96=worst). The AgeWatch Index purports to measure "...how well...aging populations are faring."

== Air quality ==
- The Air Quality Life Index (AQLI) by the Energy Policy Institute at the University of Chicago (EPIC) tracks ambient particulate pollution, measured in PM_{2.5}, and calculates its impact on life expectancy. The World Health Organization's guideline is 10 micrograms per cubic meter (μg/m^{3}). The 2016 index ranks Thailand as the seventh most polluted of 226 nations (1=highest μg/m^{3}; 226=lowest μg/m^{3}). Other ASEAN nations ranked were Laos, 8; Singapore, 12; Myanmar, 18; Indonesia, 19; Vietnam, 24; Malaysia, 41; Cambodia, 43; Brunei, 121; Philippines, 132.

== Airports ==
- World's Top Airports: Bangkok's Suvarnabhumi Airport (BKK) was ranked number 36 among the world's top 100 airports in 2018. Other ASEAN airports for 2018 were ranked: Singapore Changi Airport, 1; Kuala Lumpur International Airport, 44; Jakarta, 45; Hanoi, 82. Suvarnabhumi was ranked 38 in 2017 and 36 in 2016.

== Aquaculture ==
- Thailand was the world's tenth ranked aquaculture producer in 2015, having produced 0.9 million tonnes. Other ASEAN nations among the top ten were ranked: Indonesia, 3; Vietnam, 4; Myanmar, 9.

== Artificial intelligence readiness ==
- The Government Artificial Intelligence Readiness Index 2019 seeks to answer the question, "how well placed are national governments to take advantage of the benefits of AI in their operations and delivery of public services?" In its survey of 194 nations, research firm Oxford Insights conducted research on behalf of Canada's International Development Research Centre (IDRC). Thailand ranked 56 of 194 nations. Other ASEAN members were ranked: Singapore, 1; Malaysia, 22; Philippines, 50; Indonesia, 57; Vietnam, 70; Brunei, 121; Cambodia, 124; Laos, 137; and Myanmar, 159.

== Best countries ==
- Best Countries: U.S. News & World Report in early-2016 ranked 60 nations on nine criteria. Thailand ranked 21 of 60 (1=best, 60=worst). Other ASEAN nations ranked in the top 60 were Singapore, 15; Malaysia, 28; Vietnam, 32; The Philippines, 33; and Indonesia, 42.

== Black market ==
- Black Market Country Risk Ranking: Thailand ranked number 20 of 93 countries (1=most at risk; 93=least at risk).

== Carbon dioxide emissions ==
- The BP Statistical Review of World Energy 2019 ranked Thailand the second highest CO_{2} emitter in ASEAN in 2018, estimating its emissions at 302 million tonnes. The other five largest ASEAN economies generated: Indonesia, 543 Mt; Malaysia, 250 Mt; Singapore, 230 Mt; Vietnam, 225 Mt; and Philippines, 134 Mt. In 1965, Thailand's CO_{2} emissions were 7.4 Mt.
- Global Carbon Project: In the Global Carbon Atlas 2014, of 216 nation states/territories, Thailand ranked 18 (1=most emissions, 216=fewest emissions) in CO_{2} emissions, up from 19 in 2013.

== Cement exports ==
- Thailand was the second leading exporter of cement by dollar value in 2014. It exported US$655.8 million of cement, or 5.5 percent of total worldwide exports.

== Chemicals in agriculture ==
- According to the Thai government's The Eleventh National Economic and Social Development Plan (2012-1016), Thailand is number one in the world in the application of chemicals in agriculture. The report stated, "The use of chemicals in the agricultural and industrial sectors is growing while control mechanisms are ineffective making Thailand rank first in the world in the use of registered chemicals in agriculture."

== Child drownings ==
- As of 2020, Thailand leads ASEAN in child drownings and its death rate for drowning by children less than 15 years of age is twice the world average. From 2000 to 2018, there were more than 22,700 drowned children, averaging about 1,262 children per year or five per day. Drownings are decreasing—in 2018, 727 children drowned, down from 1,244 a decade earlier. Most drownings occur around the time of the Songkran holiday.

== Childhood ==
- Save the Children's End of Childhood Report 2018 ranks the well-being of 175 nations' children on eight metrics related to health, education, labor, marriage, childbirth, and violence. Thailand ranked 85 of 175 nations (1=best; 175=worst). Other ASEAN nations ranked were: Singapore, 1; Malaysia, 67; Brunei, 68; Vietnam, 96; Philippines, 104; Indonesia, 105; Myanmar, 107; Cambodia, 119; and Laos, 132.

== Children's future ==
- In February 2020, a commission composed of the WHO, UNICEF, and The Lancet published a report of the investigation of the impact of two existential threats to children's health, the climate emergency and predatory commercial exploitation. It ranked 180 nations according to the steps taken by each to blunt these threats to the well-being of their children. Thailand ranked 64 of 180 nations (1=best). Eight other ASEAN nations were ranked: Singapore, 12; Malaysia, 44; Vietnam, 58; Philippines, 110; Cambodia, 114; Indonesia, 117; Myanmar, 120; Laos, 137.

== Climate ==
- Climate Change Performance Index (CCPI) 2020: Of 57 nations responsible for about 90% of global energy-related CO_{2} emissions, Thailand was ranked 33rd, "poor". Other ASEAN nations ranked were Indonesia, 39 "poor" and Malaysia, 53 "very poor". Among other findings, Thailand's population and greenhouse gas (GHG) emissions continue to rise and its climate policy is "poor".
- Germanwatch's Global Climate Risk Index 2019 analyzes the extent to which countries have been affected by climate risks—impacts of weather-related loss events (storms, floods, heat waves, etc.). The most recent data available, for 2017 and from 1998 to 2017, are the basis of the report, which uses an algorithm based on deaths and financial losses. For the period 1998–2017, Thailand ranked 13 of 181 nations (1=most affected; 181=least affected). Other ASEAN nations were ranked: Myanmar, 3; Philippines, 5; Vietnam, 9; Cambodia, 19; Indonesia, 69; Laos, 89; Malaysia, 116; Brunei, 175; Singapore, 180.
- In 2019, YouGov surveyed 30,000 citizens in 28 nations about their views on climate change and the role of humans, if any, in causing it. Sixty-nine percent of Thais thought that the climate is changing and that humans were mostly responsible for it. Most of the people of other ASEAN nations surveyed were largely in agreement: Indonesia, 69%; Vietnam, 64%; Philippines, 62%; Singapore, 54%; and Malaysia, 48%.
- Global Climate Risk Index 2018: Thailand was ranked ninth on a list of countries most affected by extreme weather events during the period 1997–2016. According to the author of the study there were 137 such events in Thailand during this period. Other ASEAN nations ranked in the study were Myanmar, ranked 3; Philippines, 5; and Vietnam, 8.
- Climate Change Performance Index (CCPI) 2017: Of 58 nations responsible for about 90% of global energy-related CO_{2} emissions, Thailand was ranked 42d in taking "action on climate protection" (1=best, 61=worst), earning an assessment of "poor". Other ASEAN nations ranked were Indonesia, 22 "good"; Malaysia, 44, "poor"; and Singapore, 54, "very poor".
- Global Climate Risk Index 2017: Thailand ranked number 10 of 180 nations most affected by "...weather-related loss events..." during the period 1996-2015 (1=most affected, 180=least affected) according to Germanwatch. Other ASEAN nations ranked in the top 10 were Myanmar, 2; Philippines, 5; and Vietnam, 8.
- Climate Central: Thailand is ranked seventh (higher number=lower risk) on the "Top 20 Most At-Risk Countries" for exposure to sea level rise and coastal flooding. It estimates the number of "People living on land that will be below sea level or chronic flood levels by the end of the century, assuming current emissions trends continue, and medium sensitivity of sea level to warming." In Thailand, eight million persons, or 12% of the population, are "at-risk" according to the study. Six of ASEAN's ten member-states are on the at-risk list.
- Climate Change Performance Index 2016: Thailand ranked 49 of 61 (1=best, 61=worst) countries, putting it in the "Very Poor" performance category. Other ASEAN nations were ranked 24 (Indonesia), 39 (Malaysia), and 55 (Singapore). The report is published annually by the Climate Action Network Europe and Germanwatch.
- ND-GAIN Index: 59th of 178 countries ranked in the ND-GAIN Index, a project of the University of Notre Dame Global Adaptation Index (ND-GAIN). The index "summarizes a country's vulnerability to climate change and other global challenges in combination with its readiness to improve resilience".
- Port Cities with High Exposure and Vulnerability to Climate Extremes: According to the Organisation for Economic Co-operation and Development (OECD), Bangkok ranks seventh of the 10 most vulnerable cities, "By the 2070s, the top 10 cities in terms of population exposure (including all environmental and socioeconomic factors) are Kolkata, Mumbai, Dhaka, Guangzhou, Ho Chi Minh City, Shanghai, Bangkok, Rangoon, Miami and Hai Phòng."

== Competitiveness ==
- The Global Competitiveness Report 2019 published by the World Economic Forum, ranked 141 nations for national competitiveness, defined as the set of institutions, policies and factors that determine productivity. Thailand ranked 40 of 141 (1=best). Other ASEAN nations ranked were: Singapore, 1; Malaysia, 27; Indonesia, 50; Brunei, 56; Philippines, 64; Vietnam, 67; Cambodia, 106; Laos, 113.
- IMD World Competitive Rankings 2019: Ranked Thailand 25 of 63 nations (1=most competitive). Other ASEAN nations were ranked: Singapore, 1; Malaysia, 22; Indonesia, 32; Philippines, 46.
- Global Competitiveness Index (GCI) 2014-2015: Thailand ranked 32 of 140 economies in the World Economic Forum's GCI. It was ranked sixth in ASEAN+3 (China, Japan, South Korea). ASEAN partners Singapore ranked second and Malaysia 18th.
- IMD World Competitiveness Yearbook 2016: Thailand rose two places from 2015's ranking to rank 28 of 61 nations (1=best, 61=worst) in competitiveness.
- IMD World Competitiveness Yearbook 2015: Thailand ranked 30 of 61 nations. The ranking looks at 20 areas grouped around four main topics: economic performance, government efficiency, business efficiency, and infrastructure. Thailand's ranking in health and environment is its lowest, 54th. The best ranking is in the employment area (3rd) thanks low unemployment. Among 61 economies, Thailand's business legislation is also ranked poorly, at 51. In education, it is ranked 48. Results for other ASEAN states are mixed: Malaysia dropped from 12 to 14, Indonesia from 37 to 42, with the Philippines moving up from 42 to 41.
- IMD World Competitiveness Yearbook 2014: Thailand ranked 29 of 60 nations.

== Constitutions ==
- Since 1932, when Thailand's absolute monarchy was overturned, the country has had a world-record 20 constitutions. Since then, the kingdom has had 13 successful coups, nine failed ones, and 29 prime ministers, not including nine who served briefly in an acting capacity. Military brass have run the country for at least 53 of the 87 years from 1932–2019.

== Corruption ==
- Corruption Perceptions Index 2019: Thailand ranked 101 of 180 nations (1=cleanest; 180=most corrupt). Other ASEAN nations ranked: Singapore, 4; Brunei, 35; Malaysia, 51; Indonesia, 85; Vietnam, 96; Philippines, 113; Myanmar, 130; Laos, 130 (tie); and Cambodia, 162.
- Corruption Perceptions Index 2018: Thailand ranked 99 of 180 nations (1=clean; 180=most corrupt). Other ASEAN nations ranked: Singapore, 3; Brunei, 31; Malaysia, 61; Indonesia, 89; Philippines, 99 (tie); Vietnam, 117; Myanmar, 132; Laos, 132 (tie); and Cambodia, 161.
- Corruption Perceptions Index 2017: Thailand ranked 96 of 180 nations (1=clean; 180=most corrupt). Other ASEAN nations ranked: Singapore, 6; Brunei, 32; Malaysia, 62; Indonesia, 96 (tie); Vietnam, 107; Philippines, 111; Myanmar, 130; Laos, 135; and Cambodia, 161.
- Corruption Perceptions Index 2016: Thailand ranked 101 of 176 nations (1=clean; 176=most corrupt). Other ASEAN nations ranked: Singapore, 7; Brunei, 41; Malaysia, 56; Indonesia, 90; Philippines, 101; Vietnam, 113; Laos, 123; Myanmar, 136; and Cambodia, 156.
- Corruption Perceptions Index 2015: Thailand ranked 76 of 167 nations (1=clean; 167=most corrupt) on this annual survey. Other ASEAN nations were ranked: Singapore, 8; Malaysia, 54; Indonesia, 88; Philippines, 95; Vietnam, 112; Laos, 139; Myanmar, 147; and Cambodia, 150.
- Corruption Perceptions Index 2014: Transparency International's CPI 2014 ranked Thailand 85 of 174 countries (1=clean; 174=most corrupt). Other ASEAN nations were ranked: Singapore, 7; Malaysia, 50; Philippines, 85; Indonesia, 107; Vietnam, 119; Laos, 145; Cambodia, 156; and Myanmar, 156 (tie).

== Cost-of-living ==
- Mercer Cost of Living Survey 2016: Bangkok ranked 74 of 209 cities (1=most expensive; 209=least expensive). The Mercer survey measures the comparative cost of more than 200 items in each city, including housing, transportation, food, clothing, household goods, and entertainment. It is designed for multinationals and governments to use in determining compensation for expatriate employees.
- Cost of Living Index 2015 mid-year: Thailand ranked 89 of 125 nations (1=most expensive; 125=least expensive).

== Coups d'état ==
- "...Thailand has experienced more coups d'état than any other country in contemporary history." according to The Washington Post. Since 1932, Thailand has had seven coup attempts and 12 successful coups (as of 2015).

== Creativity ==
- On the Global Creativity Index for 2015, Thailand ranks 82 of 139 nations (1=best, 139=worst). Thailand's ASEAN partners were ranked: Singapore, 9; Laos, 42; Philippines, 52; Malaysia, 63; Vietnam, 80; Cambodia, 113; Indonesia, 115.

== Crime ==
- Number of intentional homicides committed with a firearm that were recorded in criminal (police) statistics: Ranked 3rd for the year 2000 among the 92 countries that responded to the survey (behind #1 South Africa and #2 Colombia).

== Danger to tourists ==
- In the World Economic Forum's Travel & Tourism Competitiveness Report 2017, Thailand ranked 118 of 136 nations for the safety and security of tourists. Other ASEAN nations were ranked: Singapore, 6; Malaysia, 41; Laos, 66; Cambodia, 88; Indonesia, 91; and the Philippines, 126.

== Democracy ==
- The Economist Intelligence Unit's Democracy Index 2019 ranked the status of democracy in Thailand 68th of 167 nations (1=best [Norway]); 167=worst [North Korea]). Other ASEAN nations were ranked: Malaysia, 43; Philippines, 54; Indonesia, 64; Singapore, 75; Myanmar, 122; Cambodia, 124; Vietnam, 136; and Laos, 155. Brunei was not ranked.
- The Economist Intelligence Unit's Democracy Index 2016 ranked Thailand 100 of 167 nations (1=best; 167=worst) for the state of its democracy by rating its electoral processes and pluralism, the state of its civil liberties, the functioning of its government, political participation and political culture. Other ASEAN nations ranked were Indonesia, 48; Philippines, 50; Malaysia, 65; Singapore, 70; Cambodia, 112; Myanmar, 113; Vietnam, 131; and Laos, 151.

== Drug prices ==
- The British medical start-up, Medbelle, surveyed the prices of 13 common drugs in 50 nations worldwide. Thailand's prices for the medications were 94% below the aggregated median price for the 13 drugs in the nations studied. The worst performer, the US, was found to be 307% above the median. Among ASEAN nations, Malaysia and Indonesia also had prices 90% below the median.

== E-government ==
- In the United Nations E-Government Survey 2018, Thailand was ranked 73 of 193 nations (1=best) in the provision of digital services to citizens. Other ASEAN nations were ranked: Singapore, 7; Malaysia, 48; Brunei, 59; Philippines, 75; Vietnam, 88; Indonesia, 107; Cambodia, 145; Myanmar, 157; Laos, 162.

== Ease of doing business ==
- World Bank's Doing Business 2017; Equal Opportunity for All: Thailand ranked 46th (1-easiest; 190=difficult) of 190 nations in the "Ease of Doing Business" rankings. Other ASEAN states ranked: Singapore, 2; Malaysia, 23; Brunei, 72; Vietnam, 82; Indonesia, 91; Philippines, 99; Cambodia, 131; Laos, 139; Myanmar, 170.
- World Bank's Doing Business 2016: Measuring Regulatory Quality and Efficiency: Thailand ranked 49th overall of 189 nations (1=best, 189=worst) in ease of doing business, a drop of three places in the rankings since the 2014 survey prior to the May coup. Among ASEAN nations, Thailand ranked third behind Singapore and Malaysia. In detailed rankings, Thailand ranked 97th worldwide in getting credit, 96th in ease of starting a business, 70th in paying taxes, 39th in dealing with construction permits, 57th in registering property and enforcing contracts, 56th in trading across borders, 36th for protecting minority investors, and 49th in resolving insolvency.

== Economic inequality ==
- In Credit Suisse's Global Wealth Databook 2018, Thailand overtook Russia and India to claim the title of the world's most economically unequal nation. The top 10 percent of Thailand's population as measured by wealth control 85.7 percent of the nation's riches. The bottom 70 percent control five percent. Thailand's Gini coefficient stood at 90.2 (100 = one person owns everything; 0 = total economic equality). Thailand's National Economic and Social Development Board (NESDB) was quick to repudiate the findings, calling them based on old data and faulty estimates.
- Thailand has been ranked the world's third most unequal nation after Russia and India, with a widening gap between rich and poor according to Oxfam in 2016.
- Global Wealth Report 2016: Credit Suisse's annual report on worldwide wealth and its distribution reported that Thailand ranked number three of 38 nations (1=most concentrated wealth; 38=least concentrated wealth) in the amount of national wealth owned by the top one percent. In Thailand, 58 percent of the nation's wealth was controlled by one percent of the population. The top 10 percent control almost 80 percent of the nation's wealth. Russia, at 74.5 percent, outdistanced all other nations in inequality. India at 58.4 percent nudged out Thailand for the second spot. Other ASEAN nations in the study were Indonesia at 49.3 percent and Singapore at 33 percent.

== Economy ==
- Nominal GDP growth rate: Ranked 123 of 215 (4.4 percent growth rate)
- Gross domestic product 2013: Ranked 30 of 192 (US$387 billion).
- Economic Misery Index 2015: Bloomberg News ranked Thailand number one of fifty-one nations as the happiest economy, largely due to its low inflation and unemployment.
- Quality of Life Index: Ranked 42 of 111 countries.
- Index of Economic Freedom 2022: The Heritage Foundation ranked Thailand 70 of 177 countries.
- A.T. Kearney/Foreign Policy Magazine: Globalization Index 2005. Ranked 46 of 62 countries
- World Talent Ranking, 2014: The International Institute for Management Development (IMD) assesses "the ability of countries to develop, attract and retain talent to sustain the talent pool available for enterprises operating in those economies." Ranked 34 of 60 countries.
- Global Talent Competitiveness Index, 2014. Thailand ranks 61 of 93 nations in this analysis of growing local talent or attracting talent from abroad.

== Education ==
- The OECD's Programme for International Student Assessment (PISA) 2015: Thailand ranked 54th of 70 nations (1=best; 70=worst) in the triennial testing of 15 year-olds. Thai scores dropped in all subjects since the 2012 assessment. By subject, Thailand ranked 54th in math, 57th in reading, and 54th in science.

== Energy drinks ==
- Zenith International, UK-based food and drink consultants, reported in 2009 that no country consumes more energy drinks than Thailand, where the average adult consumer then drank 11.4 L (3 US gallons) per year, four times more than in the US, the leading consumer of energy drinks.

== English proficiency ==
- EF English Proficiency Index 2018: Ranked Thailand 64 of 88 nations (1=best, 80=worst). Other ASEAN nations ranked were Singapore, 3; Malaysia, 22; Philippines, 14; Vietnam, 41; Indonesia, 51; Myanmar, 82; and Cambodia, 85.
- EF English Proficiency Index 2017: Ranked Thailand 53 of 80 nations (1=best, 80=worst). Other ASEAN nations ranked were Singapore, 5; Malaysia, 13; Philippines, 15; Vietnam, 34; Indonesia, 39; Cambodia, 77; and Laos, 80.
- EF English Proficiency Index 2015: Thailand ranked 62 of 70 nations (1=best, 70=worst), classed in the "very low [English] proficiency" quintile. Other ASEAN nation ranked were: Singapore, 12; Malaysia, 14; Vietnam, 29; Indonesia, 32; Cambodia, 69. The top ranked country was Sweden, the lowest ranked country was Libya.

== Environment ==
- Dumping plastic waste: Thailand ranked sixth of 192 nations with ocean shorelines (1=worst, 192=best). Based on 2010 data, Thailand is estimated to have contributed 1.03 million tonnes of plastic waste to the ocean. The 10 biggest marine polluters (by millions of tonnes of plastic waste dumped in the ocean each year) are: China 8.8; Indonesia 3.2; The Philippines 1.9; Vietnam 1.8; Sri Lanka 1.6; Thailand 1.0; Egypt 1.0; Nigeria 0.9; Malaysia 0.9; and Bangladesh 0.8
- Environmental Performance Index 2016: Thailand was ranked 91 of 180 nations (1=best, 180=worst) for its performance on environmental issues. Other ASEAN nations were ranked: Singapore, 14; Malaysia, 63; Philippines, 66; Brunei, 98; Indonesia, 107; Vietnam, 131; Cambodia, 146; Laos, 148; and Myanmmar, 153.
- Environmental Sustainability Index 2005: Ranked 73 of 146 countries.
- Fish species, threatened: Of 215 nations, Thailand ranked 12 (1=worst, 215=best) in fish species at risk (96 species) in 2014. ASEAN member-states ranked from number five (Indonesia) to 175 (Brunei).
- Mammal species, threatened: Of 214 countries studied, Thailand ranks ninth (1=worst, 214=best) in the world in the number of mammal species (55 species) under threat. ASEAN nations fared poorly in this study: Indonesia was number one on the world list with 184 species under threat. The remaining ASEAN nations were ranked: Malaysia, 7; Vietnam, 12; Myanmar, 14; Laos, 15; The Philippines, 19; Cambodia, 20; Brunei, 25; Singapore, 93, of 214 countries.
- Plant species (higher), threatened: The World Bank estimated in 2014 that, world-wide, 13,583 higher plant species are threatened. Of 215 nations, Thailand ranks 26 (1=worst, 215=best) in number of species threatened (133 species). Thailand's ASEAN neighbours range from number two on the list (Malaysia, 706 threatened species) to number 75 (Laos, 32 threatened species).
- Tree cover loss: Thailand ranks 29 of 197 nations (1=worst, 197=best) in tree cover loss (deforestation), 2001-2012.

== Expat destinations ==
- Top Expat Destinations 2019: In a 64 nation survey, Thailand was ranked as the 25th best destination for expats (1=best; 64=worst). Six ASEAN nations were ranked. They were ranked: Vietnam, 2; Singapore, 6; Malaysia, 9; Philippines, 27; and Indonesia, 29.
- Thailand, in a 2017 survey, ranked 18 of 55 nations (1=most desirable; 55=least desirable) in a ranking by expats of their favoured destinations. Other ASEAN nations ranked were Singapore, 9; Vietnam, 12; Malaysia, 15; Cambodia, 24; Philippines, 29; and Myanmar, 48.

== Facebook users ==
- Thailand has the sixth-largest contingent of registered Facebook users, 46 million, in Asia. India tops the list. Among ASEAN nations, Thailand ranks fourth, after Indonesia, 130 million; Philippines, 62 million; Vietnam, 50 million; Malaysia, 22 million; Myanmar, 16 million; Cambodia, 6.3 million; Singapore, 4.3 million; Laos, 2.2 million; and Brunei, 340,000.

== Female imprisonment rate ==
- Thailand's female incarceration rate is the world's highest at 66.4 female convicts per 100,000 inhabitants (As of 2015). Other ASEAN nation's female imprisonment rates are: Vietnam, 22.2; Singapore, 21.8; Myanmar, 18.8; Malaysia, 11.7; Brunei, 11.2; Philippines, 10.3; Cambodia, 8.5; Laos, 7.4; Indonesia, 3.3.

== Financial secrecy ==
- The Financial Secrecy Index is published by the Tax Justice Network. It purports to rank jurisdictions according to their secrecy and the scale of their offshore financial activities. It is a tool for understanding global financial secrecy, tax havens, or secrecy jurisdictions, and illicit financial flows or capital flight. In the 2018 index, Thailand ranked 15 of 112 jurisdictions (1-most secretive; 112=least secretive). Switzerland ranked number one in the world. Other ranked ASEAN nations were: Singapore, 5; Malaysia, 31; Philippines, 40; Indonesia, 52; Brunei, 91.

== Finance minister ==
FinanceAsia for the second year running has ranked the finance ministers of the Asia-Pacific region's 12 largest economies. In the 2016 ranking, Thailand's Apisak Tantivorawong was ranked 11th (1=best, 12=worst). Ranked worst was Malaysia's Najib Razak.

== Firearms ==
In June 2018, the Small Arms Survey released a briefing paper entitled "Estimating Global Civilian-Held Firearms". The paper estimates that the total number of guns, both licit and illicit, held by Thai civilians in 2017 was 10,300,000, equating to 15.1 firearms per 100 inhabitants. Comparable figures for other ASEAN nations are: Cambodia, 4.5 per 100 inhabitants; the Philippines, 3.6; Laos, 3.0; Myanmar, 1.6; Vietnam, 1.6; Brunei, 1.4; Malaysia, 0.7; Singapore, 0.3; and Indonesia, zero.

== Fisheries ==
Food and Agriculture Organization of the United Nations: In 2014, Thailand ranked number 14 in the world in "marine capture" of fish (harvesting of ocean species), 1.6 million tonnes, number 15 in "inland capture" (harvesting of fresh water species), 210,293 tonnesm, number 13 in "farmed species", 934,800 tonnes, and was the fourth leading exporter of fish, with exports valued at US$6.6 billion.

== Football/soccer ==
- In the 2016 FIFA/Coca-Cola World Rankings of men's football, Thailand ranked 119 of 204 nations (1=best, 204=worst). The Thai women's team ranked 32 of 136 countries.

== Fragile states ==
- The Fragile States Index 2019, compiled by the NGO, Fund for Peace, ranked Thailand 77th in the world for fragility (178=least fragile; 1=most fragile). Finland topped the ranking; Yemen was at the bottom. Other ASEAN nations were ranked: Singapore, 162; Brunei, 124; Malaysia, 119; Vietnam, 109; Indonesia, 93; Laos, 62; Cambodia, 54; Philippines, 50; Myanmar, 22.

== Freedom ==
- Freedom House's Freedom in the World 2019 ranked Thailand "not free". Its 2019 score declined from the previous year. The study scored 195 nations and 14 territories. In ASEAN, Indonesia ranked number one, but was only ranked "partly free". Other ASEAN nations were ranked in this order from top to bottom: "Partly free": Philippines; Malaysia; Singapore; Myanmar. "Not free": Thailand; Brunei; Cambodia; Vietnam; Laos.
- Freedom House, in its report, Freedom in the World 2018, ranked Thailand as "not free". Of the 210 countries ranked, Thailand was ranked 156 (1=most free; 210=least free). Other ASEAN nations ranked were: Indonesia, 98; Philippines, 105; Singapore, 124; Malaysia, 134; Myanmar, 154; Cambodia, 158; Brunei, 161; Vietnam, 178; Laos, 193.
- Freedom House, in its Freedom in the World 2015 report, reduced Thailand's previous ranking of "partly free" to "not free", making it one of 51 nations and territories in that category.

== Gasoline price ==
Thailand ranked 48 of 61 nations (1=cheapest, 61=most expensive) for a litre of gasoline (2Q2015).

== Gender gap ==
- The World Economic Forum's Global Gender Gap Report 2018 attempts to capture the magnitude of gender-based disparities in the world's states and track progress over time. In the 2018 report, gender disparities were investigated in 149 nations. Thailand ranked 73 of 149 (1=fewest disparities). It ranked very low (130) in women's political participation. Thailand's ASEAN neighbours ranked: Philippines, 8; Laos, 26; Singapore, 67; Vietnam, 77; Indonesia, 85; Myanmar, 88; Brunei, 90; Cambodia, 93; Malaysia, 101.
- The World Economic Forum's Global Gender Gap Report 2014: Thailand ranked 61 of 142 nations.

== Girls' opportunities ==
- Save the Children UK's Every Last Girl 2016 report includes a "Girls' Opportunity Index" which ranks nations on five indicators of girls' well-being: child marriage; adolescent fertility; maternal mortality; secondary school completion; number of female MPs. Thailand ranked 81 of 144 nations (1=best, 144=worst). Other ASEAN nations ranked were: Vietnam, 47; Philippines, 64; Indonesia, 73; Bhutan, 80; Cambodia, 89; and Laos, 101.

== Giving ==
- World Giving Index 2014: Overall 21 of 135 countries

== Good country ==
- The Good Country Index seeks to measure every country's "contribution to the common good of humanity and the planet". Of 153 nations ranked in 2018, Thailand ranked 60 (1=best; 153=worst). Other ASEAN nations were ranked: Singapore, 23; Malaysia, 45; Philippines, 69; Brunei, 70; Indonesia, 87; Vietnam, 116; Cambodia, 130; Laos, 134. Myanmar was not included due to lack of data.

== Halal tourism ==
- The Global Muslim Travel Index 2019 (GMTI) ranked Thailand 18th of 130 preferred destinations worldwide for Muslim tourists. Islamic ASEAN nations led the rankings: Malaysia is ranked number 1; Indonesia, 2; Brunei, 10. Among non-Muslim ASEAN nations, Singapore ranked 10; Thailand, 18; and the Philippines, 36.

== Happiness ==
- World Happiness Report 2017: Thailand ranked 32 of 155 nations (1=happiest). Other ASEAN states ranked were: Singapore, 26; Malaysia, 42; Philippines, 72; Indonesia, 81; Vietnam, 94; Myanmar, 114; Cambodia, 129.
- World Happiness Index 2016: Ranked 140 nations on four criteria. Thailand ranked 9 of 140 (1=happiest). Other ASEAN nations in the study ranked: Vietnam, 5; Indonesia, 16; Philippines, 20; Malaysia, 46; Cambodia, 74; Myanmar, 81.
- World Happiness Report 2015: Thailand ranks 34 of 158 nations in the third issuance of the World Happiness Report.

== Health-related sustainable development goals ==
- In September 2015, the UN General Assembly established Sustainable Development Goals (SDGs). The SDGs specify 17 universal goals, 169 targets, and 230 indicators. A paper published in The Lancet analyzed 33 health-related SDG indicators based on the Global Burden of Disease Study 2015 (GBD 2015). Of 188 nations, Thailand ranked 112 (1=best; 188=worst). Rankings of other ASEAN nations were: Singapore, 2; Brunei, 21; Malaysia, 46; Indonesia, 91; Vietnam, 94; Philippines, 127; Cambodia, 130; Myanmar, 135; and Laos, 136.

== Healthcare efficiency ==
- Bloomberg, using data from the World Bank, World Health Organization, UN Population Division, International Monetary Fund and others, compiled its "Bloomberg Healthcare Efficiency Index" for 2018. It measures healthcare expenditures by country versus health outcomes. Of the 56 nations surveyed in 2018, Thailand was ranked 27th, up from 41 in 2017. Its per capita healthcare spending dropped 40 percent from 2017 to 7,086 baht (US$219), while life expectancy rose to 75.1 years, up from 74.6. The only other ASEAN nations listed were Singapore, ranked second, and Malaysia at 29.

== Homicides ==
- Thailand ranked 30 of 216 countries for its number of homicides (2,387) in 2015. Other ASEAN nations ranked: Philippines, 14 (9,756 homicides); Vietnam, 39 (1,358); Myanmar, 41 (1,304); Indonesia, 42 (1,277); Malaysia, 74 (540); Laos, 79 (467); Cambodia, 100 (268); Singapore, 175 (14); Brunei, 197 (2). Among ASEAN nations, the Philippines had the highest rate of homicides per 100,000 population (9.84), followed by Laos (6.87), and Thailand (3.51). Singapore had the lowest homicide rate in ASEAN, with just 0.25 murders per 100,000 population.

== Ignorance ==
- The Perils of Perception Survey 2016 conducted by Ipsos MORI ranked Thailand seventh of 40 countries (1=worst; 40=best) on the population's knowledge of their home country. Citizens of India were judged to be the least informed, while the Dutch ranked as most accurate in their knowledge of world and national affairs. Other ASEAN nations ranked in what Ipsos MORI calls its "index of ignorance", were Singapore, ranked eighth; Indonesia, 10; Philippines, 16; Vietnam, 22; and Malaysia, 36.

== Information technology ==
- World Economic Forum (WEF): The Global Information Technology Report (GITR) 2015 features the latest iteration of the Networked Readiness Index (NRI), which assesses the factors, policies, and institutions that enable a country to fully leverage information and communication technologies (ICTs) for increased competitiveness and well-being. Thailand ranked 67 of 143 nations.

== Innovation ==
- The Global Innovation Index 2026, by World Intellectual Property Organization: Thailand ranked 44 of 139 nations.
- The Global Innovation Index 2019 ranked Thailand 43 of 129 nations. Other ASEAN nations ranked were: Singapore, 8; Malaysia, 35; Vietnam, 42; Philippines, 54; Brunei, 71; Indonesia, 85; Cambodia, 98.
- The Bloomberg Innovation Index, 2018 ranked Thailand 45 of 50 nations (1=most innovative; 50=less innovative). Singapore was ranked 3 and Malaysia number 26.
- The Bloomberg Innovation Index, 2017 ranked Thailand 44 of 50 nations (1=most innovative; 50=less innovative), a rise from 47 in the 2016 ranking. Other ASEAN nations ranked were Singapore, 6 of 50 and Malaysia, 23 of 50.
- The Global Innovation Index 2015 ranked Thailand 55 of 141 (1=best; 141=worst) countries.

== Instant noodle consumption ==
- World Instant Noodle Association: Of 43 nations, Thailand is the eighth biggest consumer of instant noodles, consuming three billion packet/cups in 2014. The Bangkok Post reported in 2018 that Thais consume 49 packages of instant noodles per year per capita, more than three times the global average of 13.3 packages.

== Internet ==
- Freedom House's Freedom on the Net2018 gave Thailand a score of 65 (0=best, 100=worst) for internet freedom. Not one of the eight ASEAN nations listed in the report achieved a "free" rating. Best was the Philippines; worst was Vietnam.
- Freedom House: In 2015 awarded Thailand an overall score of 63 ("not free") (0=best, 100=worst) for Internet freedom in the calendar year 2014, ranking 50 of 65 countries. In 2013 Thailand was rated as "partly free".
- International Telecommunication Union (ITU): In their 2012 report, ranked Thailand 92 of 155 countries for telecommunications infrastructure.
- Ookla Speedtest: The company known for its popular Internet utility, Speedtest, ranked all nations for rolling mean download speed in Mbps (megabit per second) in May 2015. Rankings are based on throughput over the previous 30 days to servers not more than 480 km from the client computer. Thailand ranked 52nd of 200 nations (20 Mbit/s). Other ASEAN nations ranked were Singapore (1 of 200 nations) 122 Mbit/s; Vietnam (61 of 200) 20 Mbit/s; Cambodia (110 of 200) 9 Mbit/s; Brunei (116 of 200) 8 Mbit/s; Malaysia (130 of 200) 7 Mbit/s; Laos (133 of 200) 7 Mbit/s; Indonesia (139 of 200) 7 Mbit/s; Myanmar (140 of 200) 7 Mbit/s; and the Philippines (176 of 200) 4 Mbit/s.
- According to Romanian internet security software firm Bitdefender, Thailand ranked fifth of 25 Asian nations in quantity of internet malware detected. India, Indonesia, China, and Vietnam were the top four cyber-security risks in Asia. Globally, Thailand's exposure to cyber-attacks was ranked 11th of 200 nations (1=worst, 200=best). The report echos a similar finding by Microsoft researchers in 2015.

== IQ ==
From 2002 to 2006 two professors conducted IQ research in more than 180 nations. The result was their World Ranking of Countries by Their Average IQ, rank ordered by average IQ (with many ties due to identical results). Thailand ranked 16 with an average IQ of 91. Other ASEAN nations ranked: Singapore, 2-average IQ 108; Vietnam, 01-109; Malaysia, 15-92; Brunei, 16-91; Cambodia, 16-91; Laos, 18-89; Indonesia, 20-87; Myanmar, 20-87; Philippines, 21-86.

== Knowledge of society ==
- The Ipsos Perils of Perception 2018 study purports to measure "... which key facts [issues and facts about their nation] the online public across 37 countries get right about their society—and which they get wrong .... the survey aims to highlight how we're wired to think in certain ways and how our environment influences our (mis)perceptions." Thailand ranked number one in the 2018 survey (1=least accurate perceptions; 37=most accurate perceptions) meaning Thais were least knowledgeable about their society compared with citizens of 36 other nations. Other Asian nations ranked were: Malaysia, 4; China, 9; India, 12; Japan, 16; South Korea, 24; Singapore, 31; and the most knowledgeable citizenry, Hong Kong, 37.

== Logistics ==
- In the World Bank's Logistics Performance Index (LPI) 2018 Thailand ranked 32 of 160 nations (1=best, 160=worst). Other ASEAN nations were ranked: Singapore, 7; Vietnam, 39; Malaysia, 41; Indonesia, 46; Philippines, 60; Brunei, 80; Laos, 82, Cambodia, 98 and Myanmar, 137.

== Marine plastic waste ==
- Thailand was ranked sixth of 20 nations (1=biggest contributor; 20=lowest contributor) for its contribution to marine plastic waste in 2010. Other ASEAN nations were ranked: Indonesia, 2; Philippines, 3; Vietnam, 4; Malaysia, 8; Myanmar, 17. Thailand's contribution to sea debris has reportedly risen from 400,000 tonnes in 1967 to one million tonnes in 2019.

== Military strength ==
- Credit Suisse ranked Thailand's military as the 16th most powerful in the world in 2015.

== Misery Index ==
- Bloomberg's Misery Index 2019 ranked Thailand as the world's "least miserable" economy. The index is calculated as the sum of a country's inflation and unemployment rates. In 2019, Bloomberg again took a swipe at Thai statistics: "Thailand again claimed the title of the 'least miserable' economy, though the government’s unique way of tallying unemployment makes it less noteworthy...." Singapore was ranked as the third "least miserable" and Malaysia, sixth.
- Bloomberg's Misery Index 2017 ranked Thailand 65 of 65 nations (65=least miserable, 1=most miserable). The index measures the unemployment rate coupled with the inflation rate. Bloomberg commented that "The least miserable country is once again Thailand—in large part due to its unique way of calculating employment..." Other ASEAN nations were ranked: Singapore, 64; Malaysia, 55; Vietnam, 54; Philippines, 37; Indonesia, 23.
- Bloomberg's Misery Index 2016 ranked Thailand 63 of 63 nations (63=least miserable, 1=most miserable). The index measures the unemployment rate coupled with the inflation rate.

== Mobile network speeds ==
- In a 2017 report published by the UK firm, OpenSignal, Thailand ranked 70 of 89 nations (1=fastest, 89=slowest). The report drew on 19 billion samples collected by more than one million OpenSignal users from November 2016 to January 2017. Thai mobile users can expect an average mobile data speed of 6.09 Mbps compared with number one South Korea's 37.5 Mbps. Other ASEAN nations ranked were Singapore, ranked fourth; Brunei, 46; Malaysia 57 (7.86 Mbps); Cambodia, 74; Myanmar, 78 (4.81 Mbps); Indonesia, 80 (4.72 Mbps); Philippines, 86 (3.33 Mbps).

== Motorbike death rate ==
- In 2016 Thailand led the world in the death rate of operators and passengers of two- and three-wheeled motorbikes. Its fatality rate was 74.4 per 100,000 population.

== Obesity ==
- The British medical journal, Lancet, published a study examining trends in mean body mass index (BMI) for adults in all countries. Obesity was defined as a BMI score greater than 30. Age standardized obesity rates in 2014, broken down by country and gender were extracted from these data. Included were all countries with a population of 10 million or more. Thailand ranked 34 of the top 55 countries (of 200 countries total irrespective of population) (1=most obese). Other ASEAN nations ranked were Malaysia, 32; Indonesia, 41; Philippines, 42; Myanmar, 48; Vietnam, 55. In all ASEAN nations listed, the rate of female obesity exceeded that of males.

== Ocean pollution ==
- A Wall Street Journal report on ocean pollution, specifically, "Annual metric tonnes of mismanaged plastic waste in global waters", identified the top 12 polluting nations as of 2010. China was number one, Thailand at number seven, tied with Egypt. Five ASEAN nations were among the 12: Indonesia, 2; Philippines, 3; Vietnam, 4; Thailand, 7; Malaysia, 8.

== Overshoot Day ==
- The Global Footprint Network measures the ecological footprint of the world's nations versus each nation's biocapacity. From this it derives an Earth Overshoot Day, an aggregation of the "overshoot day" for each country. The overshoot day is the day that the nation's footprint exceeds its biocapacity. Measurements are made in global hectares (gha). In 2019, the group issued their analysis based on 2016 data. Overshoot days for 135 countries ranged from Qatar on 11 February to Kyrgyzstan on 26 December. Thailand's overshoot day is 28 August. Overshoot days for other ASEAN nations were: Singapore, 12 April; Brunei, 21 May; Malaysia, 1 June; Vietnam, 8 October; Laos, 9 November; Indonesia, 18 December; Myanmar, 25 December. The ecological footprint per person in Cambodia and the Philippines are less than global biocapacity constant (1.63 gha) and thus do not have an overshoot day.

== Passport power ==
- The Henley Passport Index 2019 measures how many nations a given passport can enter without a visa. It ranks 190 nations on the "strength" of its passport. Thailand was ranked 68 of 190 countries (1=strong passport; 190=weak passport). A Thai passport can gain entry to 75 nations visa free. Other ASEAN nations ranked were: Singapore, 2/189 countries visa-free; Malaysia, 12/179; Brunei, 21/165; Indonesia, 72/71; Philippines, 74/66; Cambodia, 84/54; Laos, 86/52; Vietnam, 87/51; Myanmar, 90/48.
- Arton Capital's Passport Index 2017 ranks 193 member nations of the UN, as well as six territories, a total of 199 passport-issuing entities, on the number of countries a given passport can enter either visa-free (VF) or with a visa on arrival (VOA). Thailand ranked 107th of 199 nations in the number of VF/VOA countries granting its citizens visa-less entry (1=most passport power; 199=least passport power). Other ASEAN nations ranked were Singapore, 3; Malaysia, 19; Brunei, 49; Philippines, 127; Indonesia, 137; Cambodia, 154; Vietnam, 159; Laos, 169; and Myanmar, 180. The Passport Index also ranks countries by the number of countries to which they extend VF or VOA visas, a "Welcoming Index". Thailand ranked 62nd of 104 nations (due to numerous ties) (1=most countries granted VF or VOA entry; 104=fewest countries granted VF or VOA entry). Other ASEAN nations ranked were Cambodia, 1; Laos, 15; Indonesia, 16; Malaysia, 17; Singapore, 18; Philippines, 19; Brunei, 70; Vietnam, 83; Myanmar, 96.

== Peace ==
- The Global Peace Index 2018, published by the Institute for Economics and Peace ranked Thailand 113 of 163 nations for overall level of peacefulness (1=most peaceful; 163=least peaceful). Other ASEAN nations ranked were: Singapore, 8; Malaysia, 25; Laos, 46; Indonesia, 55; Vietnam, 60; Cambodia, 96; Myanmar, 122; and Philippines, 137.

== Physical activity ==
- The Global Matrix 2.0 on Physical Activity for Children and Youth (2016) gave Thailand a score of D-minus (A=best, B-C-D, F=worst). The only other ASEAN country in the study of 38 nations was Malaysia, which received a score of D.

== Pickup trucks ==
- Thailand ranks number two in the world in pickup truck sales, after the US, but is number one in pickup trucks per capita.

== Press freedom ==
- The 2020 World Press Freedom Index published by Reporters without Borders ranked Thailand 140 of 180 (1=best; 180=worst) nations in press freedom. Other ASEAN nations were ranked: Malaysia, 101; Indonesia, 119; Philippines, 136; Myanmar, 139; Cambodia, 144; Brunei, 152; Singapore, 158; Laos, 172; Vietnam, 175.
- The 2019 World Press Freedom Index published by Reporters without Borders ranked Thailand 136 of 180 (1=best; 180=worst) nations in press freedom. Other ASEAN nations were ranked: Malaysia, 123; Indonesia, 124; Philippines, 134; Myanmar, 138; Cambodia, 143; Singapore, 151; Brunei, 152; Laos, 171; Vietnam, 176.
- The 2018 World Press Freedom Index published by Reporters without Borders ranked Thailand 140 of 180 (1=best; 180=worst) nations in press freedom. Other ASEAN nations were ranked: Indonesia, 124; Philippines, 133; Myanmar, 137; Cambodia, 142; Malaysia, 145; Singapore, 151; Brunei, 153; Laos, 170; Vietnam, 175.
- The World Press Freedom Index 2016: Reporters Without Borders ranked Thailand 136 of 180 (1=best, 180=worst) countries. ASEAN as a whole ranked poorly, with Cambodia the best at 128 and Vietnam the worst at 175.
- The World Press Freedom Index 2015: Reporters Without Borders ranked Thailand 134 of 180 (1=best, 180=worst) countries
- Freedom of the Press 2015: Thailand was ranked 166 of 199 (1=best, 199=worst) nations by Freedom House.

== Prison population ==
- Thailand ranks seventh in the world in prison population per 100,000 citizens (1=highest prisoner rate; 221=lowest prisoner rate). Thailand jails 450 persons per 100,000 population. Other ASEAN nations, their world ranking, and their incarceration rates: Singapore ranked 63 (prisoner rate, 219); Malaysia, 85 (167); Vietnam, 102 (146); Philippines, 109 (140); Brunei, 116 (134); Laos, 134 (119); Cambodia, 136 (116); Myanmar, 141 (113); Indonesia, 167 (76). Despite its population of only about 70 million, its total prison population ranks sixth in the world.

== Prosperity ==
- The Legatum Institute's yearly Legatum Prosperity Index for 2015 ranks Thailand 48 of 142 (1=best, 142=worst) nations. The ranking is based on a variety of factors including wealth, economic growth, education, health, freedom, personal well-being, and quality of life. Other ASEAN nations ranked were Singapore, 17; Malaysia, 44; Vietnam, 55; Indonesia, 69; Philippines, 74; Laos, 95; Cambodia, 112.

== Prostitution ==
- Number of prostitutes: Of 29 nations, Thailand is ranked eighth in number of prostitutes (1=most; 29=fewest). Thailand is estimated to have 250,000 prostitutes. Other ASEAN nations making the list were the Philippines (fourth, 800,000 prostitutes); Cambodia (13th, 70,000); Vietnam (17th, 33,000). The world total is estimated at 13,828,700 prostitutes. China is number one, with an estimated five million.
- Prostitution revenues: In a list of 24 nations, Thailand ranked eighth (1=most prostitution revenue; 24=least prostitution revenue), with revenues estimated at US$6.4 billion (no date). China topped the list at US$73 billion. Other ASEAN nations listed were the Philippines (ninth, US$6bn); Indonesia (12th, US$2.25bn); and Cambodia (19th, US$511 million).

== Quality of living ==
- Bangkok was ranked 129th of 230 (1=best quality of living, 230=worst quality of living) cities worldwide in Mercer's 2016 Quality of Living survey rankings. Vienna was ranked number 1, Baghdad last. Singapore (26) is the highest-ranked Asian city. Behind Singapore, the second highest-ranked city in Southeast Asia is Kuala Lumpur (86). Manila is ranked 136 and Jakarta 142. On the "personal safety" component of the ranking, Bangkok was ranked 173rd, due to political unrest and terrorist attacks.

== Railroad infrastructure ==
- Thailand ranked number 78 of 108 nations (1=best, 108=worst) for railway infrastructure in 2015 according to the World Economic Forum (WEF). Other ASEAN nations were ranked: Singapore, 8; Malaysia, 13; Indonesia, 43; Vietnam, 48; Philippines, 84; Myanmar, 96; Cambodia, 100.

== Real estate ==
- Global Real Estate Transparency Index 2016: Thailand ranked 38 of 109 nations (1=most transparent, 109=opaque).

== Retail floor space ==
Thailand is estimated to have 2.3 square feet of retail floor space per capita, on a par with Germany. The US figure is 23.5 square feet, topping the list. Japan has 4.4 ft^{2}; China 2.8 ft^{2}; and Indonesia 1 ft^{2}.

== Rice ==
- From 2009 to 2019, Thailand's hom mali 105 (jasmine) rice has been declared the world's best rice five times. But in 2018, Cambodian Malys Angkor jasmine rice was the winner, and Vietnam's ST24 rice took top honours in 2019, causing panic among Thai rice producers as ST24 is half the price of Thai hom mali.

== Richest royals ==
- The Crown Property Bureau presides over the wealth of Thailand's king and royal family, judged to be the world's richest. Its holdings include over 7,588 rai (1,214.1 ha; 3,000 acres) of land in central Bangkok and shares in Siam Cement and Siam Commercial Bank. The king also owns the 545-carat Golden Jubilee Diamond, the largest cut and faceted diamond in the world.

== Risk (natural disaster) ==
- The World Risk Report 2016 ranked Thailand 89th of 171 nations at risk (1=most at risk; 171 least at risk) from natural disasters.

== Road traffic death rate ==
- The World Health Organization's (WHO) Global Status Report on Road Safety 2018 reported Thailand as having the world's sixth highest "estimated road traffic death rate per 100,000 population" (2016 figures). Four of the top death rates occur in African nations. They, and the Dominican Republic, are the only countries to exceed Thailand's death rate. Among ASEAN nations, Thailand was ranked one, with 32.7 deaths per 100,000 persons; Vietnam, 26.4; Malaysia, 23.6; Myanmar, 19.9; Cambodia, 17.8; Laos, 16.6; Philippines, 12.3; Indonesia, 12.2; Singapore, 2.8.
- Global Status Report on Road Safety 2015: Thailand has an "Estimated Road Traffic Death Rate" of 36.2 persons per 100,000 population, ranked 2 of 180 countries (1: worst, 180: best). Seventy-three percent of fatalities involved two- or three-wheeled motorized vehicles. In other ASEAN countries, corresponding death rates were: Vietnam, 24.5; Malaysia, 24; Myanmar, 20.3; Cambodia, 17.4; Indonesia, 15.3; Laos, 14.3; Philippines, 10.5; Singapore, 3.6.

== Rule of law ==
- World Justice Project's Rule of Law Index 2015 ranked Thailand 56 of 102 nations, and 11 of 15 in the region.

== Safe cities ==
- Safe Cities Index 2019, published by the Economist Intelligence Unit, ranked 60 world cities on such criteria as personal safety, digital security, and infrastructure security. Bangkok ranked 47 of 60 (1=most safe; 60=least safe), tied with Ho Chi Minh City. Other ASEAN cities ranked were Singapore, 2; Kuala Lumpur, 35; Manila, 43; Jakarta, 53.

== Scientific journal ranking ==
- SCImago Journal Rank: Thailand ranked 43 of 239 nations in the number of articles published in scientific journals between 1996 and 2014.

== Services offshoring ==
- Global Services Location Index 2014: Thailand ranked number six of 50 countries among the best locations to offshore service functions.

== Sex ==
- Average number of lifetime sexual partners: In 2005 Thailand ranked 16 of 34 countries with an average of 10.6 sexual partners. This statistic shows the average number of sexual partners of people in selected countries all over the world. The global average number of sexual partners is nine. Thais have sex with 10.6 different people on average during their lifetime.
- Most adulterous countries: Percentage of Thai married adults who have admitted to having an affair: 57 percent. Thailand ranks number one of ten. In an unrelated study by condom manufacturer Durex, Thai men were ranked number one in the world for infidelity and Thai women are ranked second as the world's most unfaithful lovers, with well over half of them admitting to frequent infidelity. Durex's findings have been hotly disputed.

== Skyscrapers ==
- The German building research firm Emporis ranks world cities by the number of their skyscrapers. Emporis defines a skyscraper as "...any multilevel building with an architectural height of at least 100 metres." Bangkok ranks number seven of the 100 cities with the most skyscrapers. Bangkok has 376. Other ASEAN cities listed are Singapore, ranked 4 with 506 skyscrapers; Kuala Lumpur, ranked 14 with 202; Jakarta, ranked 17 with 181; Hanoi, ranked 36 with 120; Ho Chi Minh City, ranked 43 with 103; and Manila, ranked 93 with 37 skyscrapers.

== Slavery ==
- The Global Slavery Index 2018, ranking the prevalence of modern slavery by nation, ranked Thailand 23 of 167 (1=worst; 167=best). The index claims that Thailand has 610,000 persons working in conditions of modern slavery, equating to 8.9 persons of every thousand. Other ASEAN nations ranked were: Cambodia, 9; Myanmar, 18; Brunei, 19; Laos, 22; Philippines, 30; Malaysia, 42; Indonesia, 74; Vietnam, 77; Singapore, 97.
- The Global Slavery Index 2016, published by the Walk Free Foundation, ranked Thailand 20 (tied with eight other countries) of 167 nations (1=worst) for the estimated percentage of its population in "modern slavery". ASEAN is well-represented in the index: Cambodia was ranked 2; Myanmar, 9; Brunei, 14; Malaysia, 29; Philippines, 33; Laos, 37; Indonesia, 39 (tied with one other country); Singapore, 45 (tied with one other country); and Vietnam, 47.

== Social ==
- Social Progress Index 2017: Thailand ranked 62 of 128 nations (1=best; 128=worst). Other ASEAN nations ranked were: Malaysia, 50; Philippines, 68; Indonesia, 79; Myanmar, 96; Cambodia, 98; and Laos, 99.
- Social Progress Index 2015: Social progress is the capacity of a society to meet the basic human needs of its citizens. Thailand ranked 57 of 113 nations (1=best; 133=worst). Other ASEAN states were ranked: Philippines, 64; Indonesia, 86; Cambodia, 99; Laos, 102; and Myanmar, 119.
- Social Progress Index 2014: Thailand ranked 59 of 132 countries
- State of the World's Mothers 2014: Ranked 72 of 178 countries.

== Solid waste ==
- The World Bank collected data on the generation of municipal solid waste around the world. Of the ASEAN countries with data, Thailand's municipalities ranked number one in the region for waste generation at 1.76 kilograms per day per person. Others were Malaysia (1.52 kg/day); Singapore (1.49 kg/day); Vietnam (1.46 kg/day); Laos (0.70 kg/day); Indonesia (0.52 kg/day); Philippines (0.50 kg/day); Myanmar (0.44 kg/day). The World Bank projects that by 2025 Thailand's municipal generation of solid waste will reach 1.95 kg per person per day.

== Stability ==
- Fragile States Index 2015: Thailand ranked 71 of 178 nations (1=worst, 178=best). Lowest ranking ASEAN neighbour state is Myanmar, ranked 27, and Singapore, highest ranking, ranked 159.

== Street network sprawl ==
- Research conducted at McGill University assessed how efficiently streets are connected, i.e., how far one has to travel to get from one point in the city to another. If streets form a tight grid, routes are shorter, walking is more convenient, and investing in public transit is more attractive to municipal governments. Researchers created the Street-Network Disconnectedness Index (SNDi). Cites with large numbers of dead ends or great distances between intersections were judged to exhibit more "sprawl". More sprawl results in more inefficient transport options and therefore more carbon emissions. Bangkok was identified as the world city exhibiting the most sprawl. Cebu in the Philippines and Palembang in Indonesia were ranked three and six on the top ten list.

== Surveillance ==
- Comparitech Limited, a UK technology advisor, published "The world's most-surveilled cities" in August 2019. It assembled data on the number of closed-circuit television (CCTV) cameras installed in 120 global cities. It then ranked the cities by number of cameras per 1,000 inhabitants. China's cities were found to be the most surveilled. Bangkok was ranked 31 (1=most surveilled; 120=least surveilled), with an estimated 53,429 cameras installed, or 5.16 cameras per 1,000 inhabitants. Other ASEAN cities were ranked: Singapore, 11 (86,000 cameras); Ho Chi Minh City, 72 (6,150 cameras); Yangon, 76 (2,995 cameras); Jakarta, 77 (6,000 cameras); Hanoi, 79 (4,400 cameras); Kuala Lumpur, 106, (1,000 cameras).

== Sustainable cities ==
- Sustainable Cities Index 2018: Bangkok ranked 80 of 100 cities (1=best; 100=worst). Other ASEAN cities ranked were: Singapore, 4; Kuala Lumpur, 67; Jakarta, 94; Manila, 95; Hanoi. 98.
- Sustainable Cities Index 2016: In this study by Arcadis NV, a Dutch design, engineering, and management consulting company, Bangkok ranked 67 of 100 (1=best; 100 worst) global cities. Other ASEAN cities ranked were Singapore, 2; Kuala Lumpur, 55; Hanoi, 87; Jakarta, 88; and Manila, 96.

== Sustainable development ==
- The Sustainable Development Index (SDI) measures the ecological efficiency of human development. Its impetus was a reaction to the UN's Human Development Index (HDI) which measures various indicators of development, but does not assess the sustainability of those underlying indicators. Countries with high human development and low ecological impact rise to the top of the SDI. Countries with low human development, and countries with high human development but high ecological impact, fall to the bottom of the SDI. The latest iteration of the index (2020) uses data from 2015, the most recent year for which data is available. In this ranking of 163 nations, Thailand ranked 44. Other ASEAN nations were ranked: Philippines, 26; Indonesia, 30; Vietnam, 42; Laos, 66; Cambodia, 77; Myanmar, 79; Malaysia, 109; Brunei, 139; and Singapore, lowest of all nations at 163.

== Talent ==
- Global Talent Competitiveness Index (GTCI) 2018: The report analyses the performance of 119 countries and 90 cities worldwide based on six factors: enabling talent, attracting talent, growing talent, retaining talent, vocational and technical skills, and global knowledge skills. Thailand ranked 70 of 119 countries (1=best; 119=worst). Other ASEAN nations ranked were: Singapore, 2; Philippines, 54; Indonesia, 77; Vietnam, 87; Laos, 95; and Cambodia, 108. Bangkok ranked 78 of 90 cities.
- Global Talent Competitiveness Index (GTCI) 2017: Thailand ranked 73 of 118 countries (1=best; 118=worst). Other ASEAN nations were ranked: Singapore, 2; Malaysia, 28; Philippines, 52; Vietnam, 86; Indonesia, 90; and Cambodia, 108.
- IMD World Talent Report 2016: This study purports to measure investment in and development of talent and the ability to attract and retain talent. Thailand ranked 37 of 61 nations (1=best; 61=worst), down three spots from 2015. Other ASEAN nations were ranked: Singapore, 15; Malaysia, 19; Indonesia, 44; Philippines, 51.

== Tourism ==
- The World Economic Forum's Travel & Tourism Competitiveness Index 2017 Report, ranked Thailand 34 of 136 nations (1=most competitive, 136=least competitive). Other ASEAN nations ranked were: Singapore, 6; Malaysia, 26; Indonesia, 42; Vietnam, 67; Philippines, 79; Laos, 94; Cambodia, 101.
- International Tourist Arrivals and Receipts: Thailand ranked number nine in 2016, with 32.5 million arrivals. It ranked third in international tourism receipts, US$49.9 billion.
- Global Destinations Cities Index 2016: In this seventh annual survey published by MasterCard, Bangkok ranked number one of 100 cities worldwide as the top global destination city as determined by number of visitors. It displaced London, the previous number one. Other ASEAN cities ranked in the survey were Singapore, 6; Ho Chi Minh City, 42; Hanoi, 52; Jakarta, 66; and Manila, 74.
- Travel and Tourism Competitiveness Report 2015: Thailand ranked 35 of 141 nations. Among ASEAN nations, Singapore was ranked 11; Malaysia, 25: Indonesia, 50; Philippines, 74; Vietnam, 75; Laos, 96; Cambodia, 105; and Myanmar, 134.
- International Tourist Arrivals: Thailand ranked number ten in 2013, up five places from 2012 with 26.5 million arrivals.
- International Tourist Receipts: Ranked number seven in the world in 2013, up two places from 2012, with receipts estimated at US$42.1 billion.
- Total tourism contribution to GDP: Thailand ranked 18 of 184 nations in 2014, with travel and tourism income totalling 2,345 billion baht or 19.3 percent of GDP.

== Traffic congestion ==
- TomTom, the Dutch manufacturer of land navigation products, ranked Bangkok as the second-most traffic-clogged city of 189 cities studied worldwide. Mexico City topped the rankings. Other ASEAN cities listed were Jakarta, third, and Singapore at 55.
- The INRIX 2016 Global Traffic Scorecard ranked Thailand as the most congested nation of 38 studied for "average peak hours spent in congestion". Thais spent an average of 61 hours in 2016 stuck in traffic. Bangkok was ranked 11 of 100 cities for "peak hours spent in congestion", 64 hours.
- Based on 2015 data, Dutch navigation and digital mapping company, TomTom NV, ranked Bangkok number two in a listing of the 174 most traffic congested cities worldwide (1=most congested; 174=least congested). Mexico City ranked number one. No other ASEAN cities made the list.

== Tyre exports ==
- Thailand is the world's fifth largest exporter of tyres, shipping 150 million per year.

== Universities ==
- According to the 2020 QS World University Rankings, Chulalongkorn University (CU) was ranked 247th in the world and earned the top ranking in Thailand for the seventh consecutive year. Also ranked were Mahidol University (314th), and Chiang Mai University and Thammasat University (both in the 601–650 tranche), and four other Thai universities in the 801–1,000 tranche.
- The Times Higher Education Asia University Rankings 2018 ranked Mahidol University as the top Thai institution. It ranked 97 of some 350 universities (1=best; 350=lowest). King Mongkut's University of Technology Thonburi was ranked 116, Chulalongkorn University 164, and Suranaree University of Technology 168. Thailand had no other universities in the top 200.
- Chulalongkorn University was ranked number one in Thailand and 45th in Asia in 2016.
- Mahidol University was ranked the top Thai university among the top 200 Asian (including Middle Eastern) universities in 2016 by Times Higher Education Asia University Rankings 2016.

== Uploading photos to social media ==
According to the Bangkok Post, Thais uploaded 495 million photos to social media in 2015, the highest number in the world.

== Vehicle manufacture ==
- Thailand ranked 11th in the world in production of motor vehicles in 2018, 2.17 million, up nine percent from 2017.
- Thailand output 1.95 million vehicles in 2015, ranking 12th in the world.

== Volkswagens ==
- Largest gathering of Volkswagens: Thailand broke the Guinness World Record for the largest congregation of Volkswagens. That honour was held previously by Brazil. A total of 490 Volkswagens gathered at the First Army Area to break Brazil's previous record of 460 Volkswagens.
