= International rankings of Spain =

These are some of the international rankings of Spain.

== Economy ==
- International Monetary Fund: Income per capita in purchasing power parity ranked 26 out of 181 (2010)
- United Nations Development Programme: Human Development Index ranked 20 out of 182 (2010)
- Gallup World Poll: happiness ranked 43 out of 155 (2009)
- World Economic Forum: Global Competitiveness Report ranked out of 133 (2010–2011)

== Technology ==
- World Intellectual Property Organization: Global Innovation Index 2026, ranked 28 out of 139 countries

== Military ==
- Institute for Economics and Peace: Global Peace Index ranked 25 out of 144 (2010)

== Politics ==
- Transparency International: Corruption Perceptions Index ranked 49 out of 181 in 2025, 41 out of 176 in 2016, 36 out of 169 in 2015 and 30 out of 180 in 2010.
- Reporters Without Borders: Press Freedom Index ranked 39 out of 178 (2010)
- The Economist: Democracy Index ranked 18 out of 167 (2010)
