= WCY =

WCY may refer to:

- West Croydon station, London, National Rail station code
- World Competitiveness Yearbook, an annual report published by the International Institute for Management Development (IMD) on the competitiveness of nations
