= Global Creativity Index =

The Global Creativity Index (GCI) is a four dimensional ranking of countries. It combines individually-ranked countries based on creativity, technology, talent, and tolerance into an overall score. The top country in 2015 was Australia, followed by the United States, with New Zealand third. The GCI is published by the Martin Prosperity Institute, which belongs to the University of Toronto's Rotman School of Management.
