= WEF Global Competitiveness Report =

Yearly report published by the World Economic Forum

The Global Competitiveness Report (GCR) was a yearly report published by the World Economic Forum. Between 2004 and 2020, the Global Competitiveness Report ranked countries based on the Global Competitiveness Index, developed by Xavier Sala-i-Martin and Elsa V. Artadi. Before that, the macroeconomic ranks were based on Jeffrey Sachs's Growth Development Index and the microeconomic ranks were based on Michael Porter's Business Competitiveness Index. The Global Competitiveness Index integrates the macroeconomic and the micro/business aspects of competitiveness into a single index.

The report "assesses the ability of countries to provide high levels of prosperity to their citizens". This in turn depends on how productively a country uses available resources. Therefore, the Global Competitiveness Index measures the set of institutions, policies, and factors that set the sustainable current and medium-term levels of economic prosperity." In 2020, the report was discontinued. In 2025, it was reported that WEF leader Klaus Schwab manipulated the report for political interests, intervening multiple times to alter or suppress unfavorable rankings from certain countries.

== Description ==
Since 2004, the report ranks the world's nations according to the Global Competitiveness Index, based on the latest theoretical and empirical research. It is made up of over 110 variables, of which two thirds come from the Executive Opinion Survey, and one third comes from publicly available sources such as the United Nations. The variables are organized into twelve pillars, with each pillar representing an area considered as an important determinant of competitiveness.

One part of the report is the Executive Opinion Survey, which is a survey of a representative sample of business leaders in their respective countries. Respondent numbers have increased every year and is currently just over 13,500 in 142 countries (2010).

The report notes that as a nation develops, wages tend to increase, and that in order to sustain this higher income, labor productivity must improve for the nation to be competitive. In addition, what creates productivity in Sweden is necessarily different from what drives it in Ghana. Thus, the GCI separates countries into three specific stages: factor-driven, efficiency-driven, and innovation-driven, each implying a growing degree of complexity in the operation of the economy.

The report has twelve pillars of competitiveness. These are:

1. Institutions
2. Appropriate infrastructure
3. Stable macroeconomic framework
4. Good health and primary education
5. Higher education and training
6. Efficient goods markets
7. Efficient labor markets
8. Developed financial markets
9. Ability to harness existing technology
10. Market size—both domestic and international
11. Production of new and different goods using the most sophisticated production processes
12. Innovation

In the factor-driven stage countries compete based on their factor endowments, primarily unskilled labor and natural resources. Companies compete on the basis of prices and sell basic products or commodities, with their low productivity reflected in low wages. To maintain competitiveness at this stage of development, competitiveness hinges mainly on well-functioning public and private institutions (pillar 1), appropriate infrastructure (pillar 2), a stable macroeconomic framework (pillar 3), and good health and primary education (pillar 4).

As wages rise with advancing development, countries move into the efficiency-driven stage of development, when they must begin to develop more efficient production processes and increase product quality. At this point, competitiveness becomes increasingly driven by higher education and training (pillar 5), efficient goods markets (pillar 6), efficient labor markets (pillar 7), developed financial markets (pillar 8), the ability to harness the benefits of existing technologies (pillar 9), and its market size, both domestic and international (pillar 10).

Finally, as countries move into the innovation-driven stage, they are only able to sustain higher wages and a higher standard of living if their businesses are able to compete by providing new or unique products. At this stage, companies must compete by producing new and different goods using the most sophisticated production processes (pillar 11) and through innovation (pillar 12).

Thus, the impact of each pillar on competitiveness varies across countries, in function of their stages of economic development. Therefore, in the calculation of the GCI, pillars are given different weights depending on the per capita income of the nation. The weights used are the values that best explain growth in recent years For example, the sophistication and innovation factors contribute 10% to the final score in factor and efficiency-driven economies, but 30% in innovation-driven economies. Intermediate values are used for economies in transition between stages.

The Global Competitiveness Index's annual reports are somewhat similar to the Ease of Doing Business Index and the Indices of Economic Freedom, which also look at factors affecting economic growth (but not as many as the Global Competitiveness Report). Data from the Global Competitiveness Index relating to the strength of auditing and reporting standards, institutions and judicial independence is used in the Basel AML Index, a money laundering risk assessment tool developed by the Basel Institute on Governance.

== Limitations ==
In spite of the World Economic Forum's Global Risks Report which is increasingly identifying environmental pressures as the dominant risks to humanity, none of the indicators used to determine this report's competitiveness ranking reflect any of the countries' environmental dimensions such as energy, water, climate risks, resource or food security, etc. The Global Competitiveness Report 2018 and 2019 used the ecological footprint as a context indicator, but the footprint was not included in the scoring algorithm that determines the ranking.

== Manipulation ==
In 2025, SonntagsZeitung reported that WEF leader Klaus Schwab manipulated the report for political interests, intervening multiple times to alter or suppress unfavorable rankings from countries in the Middle East and North Africa, as well as India.

== 2019 rankings ==
This is the full ranking of the 2019 report:

Rank	Country	Score
▲1	Singapore	84.8
▼2	United States	83.7
▲3	Hong Kong	83.1
▲4	Netherlands	82.4
▼5	Switzerland	82.3
▼6	Japan	82.3
▼7	Germany	81.8
▲8	Sweden	81.2
▼9	United Kingdom	81.2
10	Denmark	81.2
11	Finland	80.2
▲12	Taiwan	80.2
▲13	South Korea	79.6
▼14	Canada	79.6
▲15	France	78.8
▼16	Australia	78.7
▼17	Norway	78.1
▲18	Luxembourg	77.0
▼19	New Zealand	76.7
20	Israel	76.7
▲21	Austria	76.6
▼22	Belgium	76.4
▲23	Spain	75.3
▼24	Ireland	75.1
▲25	United Arab Emirates	75.0
▼26	Iceland	74.7
▼27	Malaysia	74.6
28	China	73.9
▲29	Qatar	72.9
▲30	Italy	71.5
▲31	Estonia	70.9
▼32	Czech Republic	70.9
33	Chile	70.5
34	Portugal	70.4
35	Slovenia	70.2
▲36	Saudi Arabia	70.0
37	Poland	68.9
▼38	Malta	68.5
▲39	Lithuania	68.4
▼40	Thailand	68.1
▲41	Latvia	67.0
▼42	Slovakia	66.8
43	Russia	66.7
44	Cyprus	66.4
▲45	Bahrain	65.4
▲46	Kuwait	65.1
▲47	Hungary	65.1
▼48	Mexico	64.9
▲49	Bulgaria	64.9
▼50	Indonesia	64.6
▲51	Romania	64.4
▼52	Mauritius	64.3
▼53	Oman	63.6
▼54	Uruguay	63.5
▲55	Kazakhstan	62.9
▲56	Brunei	62.8
▲57	Colombia	62.7
▲58	Azerbaijan	62.7
▼59	Greece	62.6
▼60	South Africa	62.4
61	Turkey	62.1
62	Costa Rica	62.0
▲63	Croatia	61.9
▼64	Philippines	61.9
▼65	Peru	61.7
▼66	Panama	61.6
▲67	Vietnam	61.5
▼68	India	61.4
▲69	Armenia	61.3
▲70	Jordan	60.9
▲71	Brazil	60.9
▼72	Serbia	60.9
▼73	Montenegro	60.9
▼74	Georgia	60.9
75	Morocco	60.0
▼76	Seychelles	59.6
NEW 77	Barbados	58.9
▼78	Dominican Republic	58.3
▼79	Trinidad and Tobago	58.3
▼80	Jamaica	58.3
▼81	Albania	57.6
▲82	North Macedonia	57.3
▼83	Argentina	57.2
▲84	Sri Lanka	57.1
▼85	Ukraine	57.0
▲86	Moldova	56.7
87	Tunisia	56.4
▼88	Lebanon	56.3
▲89	Algeria	56.3
▼90	Ecuador	55.7
▼91	Botswana	55.5
▼92	Bosnia and Herzegovina	54.7
▲93	Egypt	54.5
▲94	Namibia	54.5
▼95	Kenya	54.1
▲96	Kyrgyzstan	54.0
▼97	Paraguay	53.6
▼98	Guatemala	53.5
▼99	Iran	53.0
▲100	Rwanda	52.8
101	Honduras	52.7
▼102	Mongolia	52.6
▼103	El Salvador	52.6
▼104	Tajikistan	52.4
▼105	Bangladesh	52.1
▲106	Cambodia	52.1
▼107	Bolivia	51.8
▲108	Nepal	51.6
▼109	Nicaragua	51.5
▼110	Pakistan	51.4
▼111	Ghana	51.2
▼112	Cape Verde	50.8
▼113	Laos	50.1
▼114	Senegal	49.7
▲115	Uganda	48.9
▼116	Nigeria	48.3
▼117	Tanzania	48.2
▼118	Ivory Coast	48.1
NEW 119	Gabon	47.5
▼120	Zambia	46.5
▼121	Eswatini	46.4
▲122	Guinea	46.1
▼123	Cameroon	46.0
▼124	Gambia	45.9
▼125	Benin	45.8
▼126	Ethiopia	44.4
▲127	Zimbabwe	44.2
▲128	Malawi	43.7
▼129	Mali	43.6
▼130	Burkina Faso	43.4
▼131	Lesotho	42.9
NEW 132	Madagascar	42.9
▼133	Venezuela	41.8
▼134	Mauritania	40.9
▲135	Burundi	40.3
▲136	Angola	38.1
▼137	Mozambique	38.1
138	Haiti	36.3
▼139	Democratic Republic of the Congo	36.1
▼140	Yemen	35.5
▼141	Chad	35.1

== 2018 rankings ==
This is the top 30 of the 2018 report:

1. United States 85.6 (+1)
2. Singapore 83.5 (+1)
3. Germany 82.8 (+2)
4. Switzerland 82.6 (−3)
5. Japan 82.5 (+4)
6. Netherlands 82.4 (−2)
7. Hong Kong 82.3 (−1)
8. United Kingdom 82 (—)
9. Sweden 81.7 (−2)
10. Denmark 80.6 (+2)
11. Finland 80.3 (−1)
12. Canada 79.9 (+2)
13. Taiwan 79.3 (+2)
14. Australia 78.9 (+7)
15. South Korea 78.8 (+11)
16. Norway 78.2 (−5)
17. France 78 (+5)
18. New Zealand 77.5 (−5)
19. Luxembourg 76.6 (—)
20. Israel 76.6 (−4)
21. Belgium 76.6 (−1)
22. Austria 76.3 (−4)
23. Ireland 75.7 (+1)
24. Iceland 74.5 (—)
25. Malaysia 74.4 (−2)
26. Spain 74.2 (+8)
27. United Arab Emirates 73.4 (−10)
28. China 72.6(−1)
29. Czech Republic 71.2 (+2)
30. Qatar 71 (−5)

== 2017–2018 rankings ==
This is the top 30 of the 2017–2018 report:

1. Switzerland 5.86 (—)
2. United States 5.85 (+1)
3. Singapore 5.71 (−1)
4. Netherlands 5.66 (—)
5. Germany 5.65 (—)
6. Hong Kong 5.53 (+3)
7. Sweden 5.52 (−1)
8. United Kingdom 5.51 (−1)
9. Japan 5.49 (−1)
10. Finland 5.49 (—)
11. Norway 5.40 (—)
12. Denmark 5.39 (—)
13. New Zealand 5.37 (—)
14. Canada 5.35 (+1)
15. Taiwan 5.33 (−1)
16. Israel 5.31 (+8)
17. United Arab Emirates 5.30 (−1)
18. Austria 5.25 (+1)
19. Luxembourg 5.23 (+1)
20. Belgium 5.23 (−3)
21. Australia 5.19 (+1)
22. France 5.18 (−1)
23. Malaysia 5.17 (+2)
24. Ireland 5.16 (−1)
25. Qatar 5.11 (−7)
26. South Korea 5.07 (—)
27. China 5.00 (+1)
28. Iceland 4.99 (−1)
29. Estonia 4.85 (+1)
30. Saudi Arabia 4.83 (−1)

== 2016–2017 rankings ==
This is the top 30 of the 2016–2017 report:

1. Switzerland 5.81 (—)
2. Singapore 5.72 (—)
3. United States 5.7 (—)
4. Netherlands 5.57 (+1)
5. Germany 5.57 (−1)
6. Sweden 5.53 (+3)
7. United Kingdom 5.49 (+3)
8. Japan 5.48 (−2)
9. Hong Kong 5.48 (−2)
10. Finland 5.44 (−2)
11. Norway 5.44 (—)
12. Denmark 5.35 (—)
13. New Zealand 5.31 (+3)
14. Taiwan 5.28 (+1)
15. Canada 5.27 (−2)
16. United Arab Emirates 5.26 (+1)
17. Belgium 5.25 (+2)
18. Qatar 5.23 (−4)
19. Austria 5.22 (+4)
20. Luxembourg 5.2 (—)
21. France 5.2 (+1)
22. Australia 5.19 (−1)
23. Ireland 5.18 (+1)
24. Israel 5.18 (+3)
25. Malaysia 5.16 (−7)
26. South Korea 5.03 (—)
27. Iceland 4.96 (+2)
28. China 4.95 (—)
29. Saudi Arabia 4.84 (−4)
30. Estonia 4.78 (—)

== 2015–2016 rankings ==
This is the top 30 of the 2015–2016 report:

1. Switzerland 5.76 (—)
2. Singapore 5.68 (—)
3. United States 5.61 (—)
4. Germany 5.53 (+1)
5. Netherlands 5.50 (+3)
6. Japan 5.47 (—)
7. Hong Kong 5.46 (—)
8. Finland 5.45 (−4)
9. Sweden 5.43 (+1)
10. United Kingdom 5.43 (−1)
11. Norway 5.41 (—)
12. Denmark 5.33 (+1)
13. Canada 5.31 (+2)
14. Qatar 5.30 (+2)
15. Taiwan 5.28 (−1)
16. New Zealand 5.25 (+1)
17. United Arab Emirates 5.24 (−5)
18. Malaysia 5.23 (+2)
19. Belgium 5.20 (−1)
20. Luxembourg 5.20 (−1)
21. Australia 5.15 (+1)
22. France 5.13 (+1)
23. Austria 5.12 (−2)
24. Ireland 5.11 (+1)
25. Saudi Arabia 5.07 (−1)
26. South Korea 4.98 (—)
27. Israel 4.98 (—)
28. China 4.89 (—)
29. Iceland 4.83 (+1)
30. Estonia 4.71 (−1)

== 2014–2015 rankings ==
This is the top 30 of the 2014–2015 report:

1. Switzerland 5.80 (—)
2. Singapore 5.65 (—)
3. United States 5.54 (+2)
4. Finland 5.50 (−1)
5. Germany 5.49 (−1)
6. Japan 5.47 (+3)
7. Hong Kong 5.46 (—)
8. Netherlands 5.45 (—)
9. United Kingdom 5.41 (+1)
10. Sweden 5.41 (−4)
11. Norway 5.35 (—)
12. United Arab Emirates 5.33 (+7)
13. Denmark 5.29 (+2)
14. Taiwan 5.25 (−2)
15. Canada 5.24 (−1)
16. Qatar 5.26 (−3)
17. New Zealand 5.20 (+1)
18. Belgium 5.18 (−1)
19. Luxembourg 5.17 (+3)
20. Malaysia 5.16 (+4)
21. Austria 5.16 (−5)
22. Australia 5.08 (−1)
23. France 5.08 (—)
24. Saudi Arabia 5.06 (−4)
25. Ireland 4.98 (+3)
26. South Korea 4.96 (−1)
27. Israel 4.95 (—)
28. China 4.89 (+1)
29. Estonia 4.71 (+3)
30. Iceland 4.71 (+1)

== 2013–2014 rankings ==
This is the top 30 of the 2013–2014 report:

1. Switzerland 5.67 (—)
2. Singapore 5.61 (—)
3. United States 5.54 (—)
4. Finland 5.51 (+2)
5. Germany 5.48 (+2)
6. Sweden 5.48 (−2)
7. Hong Kong 5.47 (+2)
8. Netherlands 5.42 (−3)
9. Japan 5.40 (+1)
10. United Kingdom 5.37 (−2)
11. Norway 5.33 (+4)
12. Taiwan 5.29 (+1)
13. Qatar 5.24 (−2)
14. Canada 5.20 (—)
15. Denmark 5.18 (−3)
16. Austria 5.15 (—)
17. Belgium 5.13 (—)
18. New Zealand 5.11 (+5)
19. United Arab Emirates 5.11 (+5)
20. Saudi Arabia 5.10 (−2)
21. Australia 5.09 (−1)
22. Luxembourg 5.09 (—)
23. France 5.05 (−2)
24. Malaysia 5.03 (+1)
25. South Korea 5.01 (−6)
26. Brunei 4.95 (+2)
27. Israel 4.94 (−1)
28. Ireland 4.92 (−1)
29. China 4.84 (—)
30. Puerto Rico 4.67 (+1)

== 2012–2013 rankings ==
This is the top 30 of the 2012–2013 report:

1. Switzerland 5.72 (—)
2. Singapore 5.67 (—)
3. Finland 5.55 (+1)
4. Sweden 5.53 (−1)
5. Netherlands 5.50 (+2)
6. Germany 5.48 (—)
7. United States 5.47 (−2)
8. United Kingdom 5.45 (+2)
9. Hong Kong 5.41 (+2)
10. Japan 5.40 (−1)
11. Qatar 5.38 (+3)
12. Denmark 5.29 (−4)
13. Taiwan 5.28 (—)
14. Canada 5.27 (−2)
15. Norway 5.27 (+1)
16. Austria 5.22 (+3)
17. Belgium 5.21 (−2)
18. Saudi Arabia 5.19 (+1)
19. South Korea 5.12 (+5)
20. Australia 5.12 (—)
21. France 5.11 (−3)
22. Luxembourg 5.09 (+1)
23. New Zealand 5.09 (+2)
24. United Arab Emirates 5.07 (+3)
25. Malaysia 5.06 (−4)
26. Israel 5.02 (−4)
27. Ireland 4.91 (+2)
28. Brunei 4.87 (—)
29. China 4.83 (−3)
30. Iceland 4.74 (—)

== 2011–2012 rankings ==
This is the top 30 of the 2011–2012 report:

1. Switzerland 5.75 (—)
2. Singapore 5.63 (+1)
3. Sweden 5.61 (−1)
4. Finland 5.47 (+3)
5. United States 5.43 (−1)
6. Germany 5.41 (−1)
7. Netherlands 5.41 (+1)
8. Denmark 5.40 (+1)
9. Japan 5.40 (−3)
10. United Kingdom 5.39 (+2)
11. Hong Kong 5.36 (—)
12. Canada 5.33 (−2)
13. Taiwan 5.26 (—)
14. Qatar 5.24 (+3)
15. Belgium 5.20 (+4)
16. Norway 5.18 (−2)
17. Saudi Arabia 5.17 (+4)
18. France 5.14 (−3)
19. Austria 5.14 (−1)
20. Australia 5.11 (−4)
21. Malaysia 5.08 (+5)
22. Israel 5.07 (+2)
23. Luxembourg 5.03 (−3)
24. South Korea 5.02 (−2)
25. New Zealand 4.93 (−2)
26. China 4.90 (+1)
27. United Arab Emirates 4.89 (−2)
28. Brunei 4.78 (—)
29. Ireland 4.77 (—)
30. Iceland 4.75 (+1)

== 2010–2011 rankings ==
This is the top 30 of the 2010–2011 report:

1. Switzerland 5.63 (—)
2. Sweden 5.56 (+2)
3. Singapore 5.48 (—)
4. United States 5.43 (–2)
5. Germany 5.39 (+2)
6. Japan 5.37 (+2)
7. Finland 5.37 (–1)
8. Netherlands 5.33 (+2)
9. Denmark 5.32 (–4)
10. Canada 5.30 (–1)
11. Hong Kong 5.27 (—)
12. United Kingdom 5.25 (+1)
13. Taiwan 5.21 (–1)
14. Norway 5.14 (—)
15. France 5.13 (+1)
16. Australia 5.11 (–1)
17. Qatar 5.10 (—)
18. Austria 5.09 (–1)
19. Belgium 5.07 (–1)
20. Luxembourg 5.05 (+1)
21. Saudi Arabia 4.95 (+6)
22. South Korea 4.93 (—)
23. New Zealand 4.92 (–3)
24. Israel 4.91 (+3)
25. United Arab Emirates 4.89 (–2)
26. Malaysia 4.88 (–2)
27. China 4.84 (+2)
28. Brunei 4.75 (+4)
29. Ireland 4.74 (–4)
30. Chile 4.69 (—)

== 2009–2010 rankings ==
This is the top 30 of the 2009–2010 report:

1. Switzerland 5.60 (+1)
2. United States 5.59 (–1)
3. Singapore 5.55 (+2)
4. Sweden 5.51 (—)
5. Denmark 5.46 (–2)
6. Finland 5.43 (—)
7. Germany 5.37 (—)
8. Japan 5.37 (+1)
9. Canada 5.33 (+1)
10. Netherlands 5.32 (–2)
11. Hong Kong 5.22 (—)
12. Taiwan 5.20 (+5)
13. United Kingdom 5.19 (–1)
14. Norway 5.17 (+1)
15. Australia 5.15 (+3)
16. France 5.13 (—)
17. Austria 5.13 (–3)
18. Belgium 5.09 (+1)
19. South Korea 5.00 (–6)
20. New Zealand 4.98 (+4)
21. Luxembourg 4.96 (+4)
22. Qatar 4.95 (+4)
23. United Arab Emirates 4.92 (+8)
24. Malaysia 4.87 (–3)
25. Ireland 4.84 (–3)
26. Iceland 4.80 (–6)
27. Israel 4.80 (–4)
28. Saudi Arabia 4.75 (–1)
29. China 4.74 (+1)
30. Chile 4.70 (+2)

== 2008–2009 rankings ==
This is the top 30 of the 2008–2009 report:

1. United States 5.74
2. Switzerland 5.61
3. Denmark 5.58
4. Sweden 5.53
5. Singapore 5.53
6. Finland 5.50
7. Germany 5.46
8. Netherlands 5.41
9. Japan 5.38
10. Canada 5.37
11. Hong Kong 5.33
12. United Kingdom 5.30
13. South Korea 5.28
14. Austria 5.23
15. Norway 5.22
16. France 5.22
17. Taiwan 5.22
18. Australia 5.20
19. Belgium 5.14
20. Iceland 5.05
21. Malaysia 5.04
22. Ireland 4.99
23. Israel 4.97
24. New Zealand 4.93
25. Luxembourg 4.85
26. Qatar 4.83
27. Saudi Arabia 4.72
28. Chile 4.72
29. Spain 4.72
30. China 4.70

One can find the computation and structure of the GCI pp. 49–50 of the Global Competitiveness Report 2013–2014, Full Data Edition.

== See also ==
- Competition (companies)
- List of national quality awards
- World Competitiveness Yearbook
