= World Competitiveness Yearbook =

Competitiveness ranking of countries

The World Competitiveness Yearbook is an annual report published by the Swiss-based International Institute for Management Development (IMD) on the competitiveness of nations and has been published since 1989. The yearbook benchmarks the performance of 63 countries based on 340 criteria measuring different facets of competitiveness. It uses two types of data:

- 2/3 hard statistical data (international/national sources)
- 1/3 survey data (Executive Opinion Survey)

== Ranking of countries from 1997 ==
World Competitiveness Yearbook, from 1997, with latest year reported in 2024.
| Nation/Territory | 1997 | 2002 | 2007 | 2012 | 2017 | 2019 (Note: Latest year reported.) | 2020 | 2021 | 2022 | 2023 | 2024 |
|---|---|---|---|---|---|---|---|---|---|---|---|
| Singapore | 2 | 8 | 2 | 4 | 3 | 1 | 1 | 5 | 3 | 4 | 1 |
| Hong Kong | 3 | 13 | 3 | 1 | 1 | 2 | 5 | 7 | 5 | 7 | 5 |
| United States | 1 | 1 | 1 | 2 | 4 | 3 | 10 | 10 | 10 | 9 | 12 |
| Switzerland | 12 | 5 | 6 | 3 | 2 | 4 | 3 | 1 | 2 | 3 | 2 |
| United Arab Emirates | - | - | - | 16 | 10 | 5 | 9 | 9 | 12 | 10 | 7 |
| Netherlands | 4 | 4 | 8 | 11 | 5 | 6 | 4 | 4 | 6 | 5 | 9 |
| Ireland | 10 | 9 | 14 | 20 | 6 | 7 | 12 | 13 | 11 | 2 | 4 |
| Denmark | 13 | 6 | 5 | 13 | 7 | 8 | 2 | 3 | 1 | 1 | 3 |
| Sweden | 19 | 12 | 9 | 5 | 9 | 9 | 6 | 2 | 4 | 8 | 6 |
| Qatar | - | - | - | 10 | 17 | 10 | 14 | 17 | 18 | 12 | 11 |
| Norway | 5 | 14 | 13 | 8 | 11 | 11 | 7 | 6 | 9 | 14 | 10 |
| Luxembourg | 8 | 2 | 4 | 12 | 8 | 12 | 15 | 12 | 13 | 20 | 23 |
| Canada | 6 | 7 | 10 | 6 | 12 | 13 | 8 | 14 | 14 | 15 | 19 |
| China | 27 | 28 | 15 | 23 | 18 | 14 | 20 | 16 | 17 | 21 | 14 |
| Finland | 7 | 3 | 17 | 17 | 15 | 15 | 13 | 11 | 8 | 11 | 15 |
| Taiwan | 18 | 20 | 18 | 7 | 14 | 16 | 11 | 8 | 7 | 6 | 8 |
| Germany | 16 | 17 | 16 | 9 | 13 | 17 | 17 | 15 | 15 | 22 | 24 |
| Australia | 15 | 10 | 12 | 15 | 21 | 18 | 18 | 22 | 19 | 19 | 13 |
| Austria | 20 | 15 | 11 | 21 | 25 | 19 | 16 | 19 | 20 | 24 | 26 |
| Iceland | 21 | 11 | 7 | 26 | 20 | 20 | 21 | 21 | 16 | 16 | 17 |
| New Zealand | 11 | 18 | 19 | 24 | 16 | 21 | 22 | 20 | 31 | 31 | 32 |
| Malaysia | 14 | 24 | 23 | 14 | 24 | 22 | 27 | 25 | 32 | 27 | 34 |
| United Kingdom | 9 | 16 | 20 | 18 | 19 | 23 | 19 | 18 | 23 | 29 | 28 |
| Israel | 25 | 26 | 21 | 19 | 22 | 24 | 26 | 27 | 25 | 23 | 22 |
| Thailand | 31 | 31 | 33 | 30 | 27 | 25 | 29 | 28 | 33 | 30 | 25 |
| Saudi Arabia | - | - | - | - | 36 | 26 | 24 | 32 | 24 | 17 | 16 |
| Belgium | 23 | 19 | 25 | 25 | 23 | 27 | 25 | 24 | 21 | 13 | 18 |
| South Korea | 30 | 29 | 29 | 22 | 29 | 28 | 23 | 23 | 27 | 28 | 20 |
| Lithuania | - | - | 31 | 36 | 33 | 29 | 31 | 30 | 29 | 32 | 30 |
| Japan | 17 | 27 | 24 | 27 | 26 | 30 | 34 | 31 | 34 | 35 | 38 |
| France | 22 | 25 | 28 | 29 | 31 | 31 | 32 | 29 | 28 | 33 | 31 |
| Indonesia | 38 | 47 | 54 | 42 | 42 | 32 | 40 | 37 | 44 | 34 | 27 |
| Czech Republic | 33 | 32 | 32 | 33 | 28 | 33 | 33 | 34 | 26 | 18 | 29 |
| Kazakhstan | - | - | - | 32 | 32 | 34 | 42 | 35 | 43 | 37 | 35 |
| Estonia | - | 21 | 22 | 31 | 30 | 35 | 28 | 26 | 22 | 26 | 33 |
| Spain | 26 | 23 | 30 | 39 | 34 | 36 | 36 | 39 | 36 | 36 | 40 |
| Slovenia | - | 35 | 40 | 51 | 43 | 37 | 35 | 40 | 38 | 42 | 46 |
| Poland | 43 | 45 | 52 | 34 | 38 | 38 | 39 | 47 | 50 | 43 | 41 |
| Portugal | 32 | 33 | 39 | 41 | 39 | 39 | 37 | 36 | 42 | 39 | 36 |
| Latvia | - | - | - | - | 40 | 40 | 41 | 38 | 35 | 51 | 45 |
| Cyprus | - | - | - | - | 37 | 41 | 30 | 33 | 40 | 45 | 43 |
| Chile | 24 | 22 | 26 | 28 | 35 | 42 | 38 | 44 | 45 | 44 | 44 |
| India | 41 | 41 | 27 | 35 | 45 | 43 | 43 | 43 | 37 | 40 | 39 |
| Italy | 39 | 34 | 42 | 40 | 44 | 44 | 44 | 41 | 41 | 41 | 42 |
| Russia | 46 | 44 | 43 | 48 | 46 | 45 | 50 | - | - | - | - |
| Philippines | 29 | 40 | 45 | 43 | 41 | 46 | 45 | 52 | 48 | 52 | 52 |
| Hungary | 37 | 30 | 35 | 45 | 52 | 47 | 47 | 42 | 39 | 46 | 54 |
| Bulgaria | - | - | 41 | 54 | 49 | 48 | 48 | 53 | 53 | 57 | 58 |
| Romania | - | - | 44 | 53 | 50 | 49 | 51 | 48 | 51 | 48 | 50 |
| Mexico | 40 | 43 | 47 | 37 | 48 | 50 | 53 | 55 | 55 | 56 | 56 |
| Turkey | 35 | 49 | 48 | 38 | 47 | 51 | 46 | 51 | 52 | 47 | 53 |
| Colombia | 45 | 42 | 38 | 52 | 54 | 52 | 54 | 56 | 57 | 58 | 57 |
| Slovakia | - | 38 | 34 | 47 | 51 | 53 | 57 | 50 | 49 | 53 | 59 |
| Ukraine | - | - | 46 | 56 | 60 | 54 | 55 | - | - | - | - |
| Peru | - | - | - | 44 | 55 | 55 | 52 | 58 | 54 | 55 | 63 |
| South Africa | 42 | 39 | 50 | 50 | 53 | 56 | 59 | 62 | 60 | 61 | 60 |
| Jordan | - | - | 37 | 49 | 56 | 57 | 58 | 49 | 56 | 54 | 48 |
| Greece | 36 | 36 | 36 | 58 | 57 | 58 | 49 | 46 | 47 | 49 | 47 |
| Brazil | 34 | 37 | 49 | 46 | 61 | 59 | 56 | 57 | 59 | 60 | 62 |
| Croatia | - | - | 53 | 57 | 59 | 60 | 60 | 59 | 46 | 50 | 51 |
| Argentina | 28 | 48 | 51 | 55 | 58 | 61 | 62 | 63 | 62 | 63 | 66 |
| Mongolia | - | - | - | - | 62 | 62 | 61 | 60 | 61 | 62 | 61 |
| Venezuela | 44 | 46 | 55 | 59 | 63 | 63 | 63 | 66 | 63 | 64 | 67 |
| Bahrain | - | - | - | - | - | - | - | - | 30 | 25 | 21 |
| Botswana | - | - | - | - | - | - | - | 61 | 58 | 59 | 55 |
| Kuwait | - | - | - | - | - | - | - | - | - | 38 | 37 |
| Puerto Rico | - | - | - | - | - | - | - | - | - | - | 49 |
| Nigeria | - | - | - | - | - | - | - | - | - | - | 64 |
| Ghana | - | - | - | - | - | - | - | - | - | - | 65 |

== See also ==
- Global Competitiveness Report
- Competition (companies)
