= Books published per language per annum =

The table gives estimated annual production of new book titles and editions by language, in descending order. The figures are arithmetic sums of country-language estimates for 197 publishing jurisdictions. The reference period is principally 2021–2023; 2020 or another observation from the preceding decade is used where it is the latest transparent evidence. Values prefixed by “≈” are estimates. Country contributions are listed from the largest to the smallest.

Annual production of book titles by language: Top 30 plus the rest.

== List of languages ==
Books published by language per year
Rank	Language	Year	Titles	Notes / Country contributions (descending)	References
1	English	2021–2023 (principally)	≈547,732	United States ≈217,447; United Kingdom ≈155,330; India ≈33,250; Australia ≈24,250; Singapore ≈12,669; Canada ≈11,775; Nigeria ≈11,200; China ≈8,288; Malaysia ≈5,424; Indonesia ≈5,344; Philippines ≈3,186; South Africa ≈3,167; Germany ≈2,863; Iran ≈2,700; Italy ≈2,563; New Zealand ≈2,317; Turkey ≈2,263; France ≈2,210; Ireland ≈1,812; Netherlands ≈1,672; Bangladesh ≈1,620; Russia ≈1,506; United Arab Emirates ≈1,400; Japan ≈1,390; Brazil ≈1,204; Kenya ≈1,203; Taiwan ≈1,200; Norway ≈1,170; Uganda ≈1,127; Ghana ≈1,040; South Korea ≈1,004; Spain ≈894; Vietnam ≈889; Pakistan ≈875; Saudi Arabia ≈800; Poland ≈781; Egypt ≈770; Israel ≈664; Thailand ≈641; Nepal ≈625; Denmark ≈593; Argentina ≈560; Finland ≈551; Mauritius ≈548; Cameroon ≈525; Jordan ≈505; Switzerland ≈474; Sweden ≈468; Czechia ≈448; Ukraine ≈419; Sri Lanka ≈413; Romania ≈399; Bulgaria ≈387; Greece ≈380; Mexico ≈374; Qatar ≈360; Portugal ≈350; Jamaica ≈348; Lebanon ≈330; Austria ≈313; Malta ≈303; Slovenia ≈281; Botswana ≈277; Lithuania ≈271; Bahrain ≈250; Tanzania ≈249; Colombia ≈248; Kuwait ≈225; Zimbabwe ≈210; Namibia ≈203; Brunei ≈200; Oman ≈200; Cyprus ≈197; Bahamas ≈196; Barbados ≈196; Albania ≈182; Belarus ≈181; Hungary ≈180; Kazakhstan ≈180; Myanmar ≈180; Luxembourg ≈151; Cambodia ≈150; Morocco ≈150; Rwanda ≈140; Croatia ≈139; Papua New Guinea ≈135; Belgium ≈131; Azerbaijan ≈120; Ethiopia ≈117; Estonia ≈116; Iceland ≈113; Georgia ≈108; Bhutan ≈100; Ecuador ≈100; Fiji ≈100; Peru ≈99; Trinidad and Tobago ≈92; Iraq ≈90; Liberia ≈90; Malawi ≈86; Guyana ≈85; Chile ≈80; Gambia ≈80; Sierra Leone ≈80; Algeria ≈75; Latvia ≈73; Armenia ≈70; Slovakia ≈69; Seychelles ≈63; Palestine ≈60; Eswatini ≈55; Syria ≈55; Afghanistan ≈50; Antigua and Barbuda ≈50; Sudan ≈50; Costa Rica ≈45; Lesotho ≈36; Zambia ≈36; North Macedonia ≈35; Uruguay ≈30; Vatican City ≈30; Venezuela ≈30; Grenada ≈29; Saint Lucia ≈26; Tunisia ≈26; Laos ≈25; Moldova ≈25; Belize ≈24; Saint Vincent and the Grenadines ≈24; Maldives ≈23; Solomon Islands ≈23; Dominica ≈21; Panama ≈20; Saint Kitts and Nevis ≈20; Samoa ≈17; Burundi ≈16; Tonga ≈16; Libya ≈15; Montenegro ≈15; Vanuatu ≈15; Bolivia ≈10; Micronesia ≈10; Palau ≈10; Suriname ≈10; Kiribati ≈8; Marshall Islands ≈8; South Sudan ≈8; Timor-Leste ≈8; Madagascar ≈6; Nauru ≈5; Somalia ≈5; Tuvalu ≈4; Eritrea ≈3; Tajikistan ≈3; Mozambique ≈2; Angola ≈1	[M-S1]
2	Chinese	2021–2023 (principally)	≈439,358	China ≈393,689; Taiwan ≈38,000; Singapore ≈3,620; Malaysia ≈1,808; United States ≈787; United Kingdom ≈259; Japan ≈243; France ≈230; South Korea ≈226; Australia ≈157; Thailand ≈50; Canada ≈46; Italy ≈35; Russia ≈35; Brazil ≈25; Brunei ≈25; Vietnam ≈21; United Arab Emirates ≈16; Mauritius ≈15; Portugal ≈15; Spain ≈15; Cambodia ≈12; New Zealand ≈10; Germany ≈8; Ireland ≈6; Venezuela ≈3; Costa Rica ≈2	[M-S1]
3	Spanish	2021–2023 (principally)	≈166,775	Spain ≈58,487; Argentina ≈27,160; Mexico ≈17,588; Colombia ≈14,831; United States ≈9,253; Chile ≈7,840; Peru ≈7,200; Ecuador ≈4,947; Costa Rica ≈3,288; Venezuela ≈2,894; Uruguay ≈2,687; Dominican Republic ≈1,876; Cuba ≈1,538; Bolivia ≈1,142; Guatemala ≈1,084; Paraguay ≈858; Honduras ≈686; El Salvador ≈683; Panama ≈638; Brazil ≈488; Nicaragua ≈475; Italy ≈307; United Kingdom ≈288; France ≈91; Portugal ≈83; Germany ≈72; Japan ≈49; Canada ≈36; Andorra ≈25; Sweden ≈25; Switzerland ≈25; Equatorial Guinea ≈24; Russia ≈20; Netherlands ≈19; Belgium ≈15; Australia ≈12; South Korea ≈10; Belize ≈8; Ireland ≈8; Turkey ≈8; Poland ≈7	[M-S1]
4	Portuguese	2021–2023 (principally)	≈162,066	Brazil ≈140,513; Portugal ≈20,610; United States ≈185; Mozambique ≈94; United Kingdom ≈87; Spain ≈81; Japan ≈69; Cabo Verde ≈68; Angola ≈60; France ≈60; Luxembourg ≈51; Argentina ≈36; Timor-Leste ≈35; Switzerland ≈34; Guinea-Bissau ≈20; Germany ≈15; Italy ≈15; São Tomé and Príncipe ≈14; Uruguay ≈10; Ireland ≈4; Venezuela ≈3; Equatorial Guinea ≈2	[M-S1]
5	Turkish	2021–2023 (principally)	≈145,947	Turkey ≈144,857; Cyprus ≈439; France ≈160; Germany ≈158; Bulgaria ≈121; Iran ≈30; Austria ≈25; United Kingdom ≈22; Netherlands ≈20; United States ≈20; Azerbaijan ≈18; Sweden ≈16; Denmark ≈15; Greece ≈15; North Macedonia ≈12; Switzerland ≈10; Australia ≈5; Spain ≈4	[M-S1]
6	French	2021–2023 (principally)	≈133,001	France ≈106,072; Belgium ≈7,495; Canada ≈4,252; Switzerland ≈2,373; Algeria ≈2,237; Morocco ≈1,500; Côte d’Ivoire ≈1,140; Luxembourg ≈887; Cameroon ≈825; United States ≈601; Lebanon ≈495; Mauritius ≈479; Italy ≈461; Djibouti ≈369; United Kingdom ≈346; Tunisia ≈230; Mali ≈225; Spain ≈195; Burkina Faso ≈189; Guinea ≈170; Haiti ≈165; Congo, Republic of the ≈135; Niger ≈133; Egypt ≈120; Monaco ≈115; Gabon ≈114; Benin ≈113; Democratic Republic of the Congo ≈113; Iran ≈108; Senegal ≈106; Burundi ≈90; Brazil ≈86; China ≈80; Germany ≈79; Madagascar ≈74; Russia ≈70; Togo ≈70; Rwanda ≈60; Portugal ≈57; Chad ≈55; Seychelles ≈55; Cambodia ≈45; Argentina ≈39; Netherlands ≈36; Japan ≈30; Central African Republic ≈28; Syria ≈25; Israel ≈24; Colombia ≈23; Albania ≈20; Greece ≈20; Mauritania ≈20; South Korea ≈18; Comoros ≈17; Turkey ≈15; Australia ≈10; Austria ≈10; Ecuador ≈10; Ireland ≈10; Vanuatu ≈10; Andorra ≈9; Peru ≈9; Poland ≈8; Costa Rica ≈6; Estonia ≈5; Malaysia ≈5; Equatorial Guinea ≈3; New Zealand ≈3; Uruguay ≈2; South Sudan ≈1; Tanzania ≈1	[M-S1]
7	Italian	2021–2023 (principally)	≈125,193	Italy ≈123,002; Switzerland ≈759; Brazil ≈201; United States ≈185; Vatican City ≈150; San Marino ≈147; Albania ≈137; United Kingdom ≈101; Slovenia ≈90; France ≈75; Argentina ≈70; Croatia ≈61; Australia ≈60; Germany ≈50; Spain ≈49; Belgium ≈11; Egypt ≈10; Luxembourg ≈9; Portugal ≈8; Poland ≈6; Montenegro ≈5; Uruguay ≈5; Venezuela ≈2	[M-S1]
8	Indonesian	2021–2023 (principally)	≈122,945	Indonesia ≈122,905; Timor-Leste ≈10; Australia ≈8; Malaysia ≈8; Japan ≈7; United States ≈7	[M-S1]
9	Russian	2021–2023 (principally)	≈93,919	Russia ≈76,718; Belarus ≈6,175; Ukraine ≈3,357; Kazakhstan ≈3,000; Estonia ≈697; Moldova ≈678; Latvia ≈543; Kyrgyzstan ≈401; Lithuania ≈362; Azerbaijan ≈299; United States ≈278; Uzbekistan ≈208; Tajikistan ≈200; France ≈175; Israel ≈151; Georgia ≈144; Armenia ≈105; Germany ≈57; China ≈55; Turkmenistan ≈40; Bulgaria ≈36; Poland ≈35; Iran ≈30; United Kingdom ≈28; Finland ≈25; Italy ≈20; Turkey ≈18; Brazil ≈15; Japan ≈15; Greece ≈12; Spain ≈12; Portugal ≈10; Montenegro ≈8; South Korea ≈8; Australia ≈4	[M-S1]
10	German	2021–2023 (principally)	≈87,952	Germany ≈68,003; Austria ≈10,005; Switzerland ≈5,694; Luxembourg ≈665; Italy ≈512; United States ≈509; Liechtenstein ≈494; United Kingdom ≈288; Brazil ≈287; Belgium ≈187; Spain ≈146; Hungary ≈99; Poland ≈90; Russia ≈85; France ≈84; Romania ≈69; China ≈60; Argentina ≈50; Netherlands ≈45; Norway ≈44; Slovenia ≈39; Belarus ≈35; Denmark ≈30; Iran ≈30; Sweden ≈30; Albania ≈25; Czechia ≈25; Japan ≈25; Ukraine ≈25; Croatia ≈21; Slovakia ≈20; Portugal ≈19; Colombia ≈18; Canada ≈16; Greece ≈15; Kazakhstan ≈15; South Korea ≈15; Chile ≈14; Bulgaria ≈13; Egypt ≈13; Turkey ≈12; Australia ≈10; Estonia ≈10; Moldova ≈10; Namibia ≈9; Peru ≈8; Ireland ≈7; Lithuania ≈5; Malaysia ≈5; Costa Rica ≈4; Uruguay ≈4; Montenegro ≈3; New Zealand ≈3; Bolivia ≈2; Venezuela ≈1	[M-S1]
11	Persian	2021–2023 (principally)	≈81,116	Iran ≈81,000; United States ≈35; France ≈30; Sweden ≈20; Azerbaijan ≈12; United Kingdom ≈10; Australia ≈7; Tajikistan ≈2	[M-S1]
12	Korean	2021–2023 (principally)	≈71,202	South Korea ≈69,277; China ≈704; North Korea ≈495; United States ≈416; Japan ≈167; Australia ≈38; France ≈25; Malaysia ≈22; Russia ≈22; Brazil ≈20; United Kingdom ≈12; New Zealand ≈4	[M-S1]
13	Japanese	2021–2023 (principally)	≈68,125	Japan ≈67,405; United States ≈231; Brazil ≈143; South Korea ≈113; France ≈95; China ≈75; Australia ≈37; United Kingdom ≈14; Malaysia ≈7; Spain ≈5	[M-S1]
14	Arabic	2021–2023 (principally)	≈58,440	Egypt ≈18,290; Saudi Arabia ≈7,200; Jordan ≈5,813; Algeria ≈4,846; Morocco ≈3,000; Iraq ≈2,250; Syria ≈1,980; Lebanon ≈1,925; United Arab Emirates ≈1,925; Kuwait ≈1,275; Palestine ≈1,140; Israel ≈1,107; Tunisia ≈1,022; Iran ≈900; Qatar ≈840; Oman ≈800; Bahrain ≈750; Yemen ≈490; Libya ≈475; Sudan ≈425; United States ≈370; Turkey ≈249; Djibouti ≈246; United Kingdom ≈231; Germany ≈100; Australia ≈90; Sweden ≈78; Italy ≈77; Mauritania ≈75; France ≈71; Malaysia ≈51; Spain ≈49; China ≈45; Chad ≈40; Canada ≈26; Bangladesh ≈25; Netherlands ≈25; Russia ≈25; Denmark ≈20; Norway ≈20; Brazil ≈18; Finland ≈10; Belgium ≈9; Japan ≈8; Portugal ≈7; Ireland ≈5; South Korea ≈5; Eritrea ≈4; South Sudan ≈4; Somalia ≈3; Comoros ≈1	[M-S1]
15	Polish	2021–2023 (principally)	≈38,880	Poland ≈37,882; United Kingdom ≈375; Ukraine ≈117; Belarus ≈101; United States ≈93; France ≈75; Brazil ≈72; Lithuania ≈60; Germany ≈57; Czechia ≈15; Ireland ≈15; Spain ≈8; Portugal ≈5; Slovakia ≈5	[M-S1]
16	Dutch	2021–2023 (principally)	≈37,033	Netherlands ≈25,919; Belgium ≈10,867; France ≈110; Suriname ≈60; United States ≈20; Germany ≈18; United Kingdom ≈18; Brazil ≈10; Spain ≈7; Portugal ≈4	[M-S1]
17	Vietnamese	2021–2023 (principally)	≈28,996	Vietnam ≈28,450; United States ≈370; Australia ≈75; France ≈65; Japan ≈12; Cambodia ≈8; South Korea ≈6; Germany ≈5; Malaysia ≈5	[M-S1]
18	Hindi	2021–2023 (principally)	≈25,894	India ≈25,650; Mauritius ≈55; United Arab Emirates ≈54; United States ≈45; United Kingdom ≈25; Bangladesh ≈20; Australia ≈15; Malaysia ≈15; New Zealand ≈7; Brazil ≈5; Portugal ≈3	[M-S1]
19	Romanian	2021–2023 (principally)	≈21,491	Romania ≈18,936; Moldova ≈2,157; France ≈85; Serbia ≈69; Ukraine ≈59; United Kingdom ≈45; Italy ≈30; Hungary ≈26; Spain ≈20; United States ≈18; Russia ≈15; Germany ≈10; Portugal ≈10; Brazil ≈8; Ireland ≈3	[M-S1]
20	Thai	2021–2023 (principally)	≈15,300	Thailand ≈15,230; Vietnam ≈36; Australia ≈8; Malaysia ≈8; United States ≈8; Japan ≈7; South Korea ≈3	[M-S1]
21	Serbian	2021–2023 (principally)	≈15,095	Serbia ≈13,800; Bosnia and Herzegovina ≈649; Montenegro ≈487; Kosovo ≈50; Croatia ≈45; Slovenia ≈25; Romania ≈20; Hungary ≈11; North Macedonia ≈8	[M-S1]
22	Czech	2021–2023 (principally)	≈14,497	Czechia ≈14,346; Slovakia ≈124; Poland ≈12; Serbia ≈9; Croatia ≈6	[M-S1]
23	Greek	2021–2023 (principally)	≈13,981	Greece ≈12,172; Cyprus ≈1,535; Turkey ≈83; Albania ≈70; Australia ≈60; United States ≈25; United Kingdom ≈16; Germany ≈12; Brazil ≈8	[M-S1]
24	Ukrainian	2021–2023 (principally)	≈13,176	Ukraine ≈12,590; Russia ≈100; Moldova ≈81; Poland ≈78; Belarus ≈62; Brazil ≈57; France ≈30; Romania ≈30; United Kingdom ≈30; United States ≈30; Italy ≈15; Germany ≈14; Portugal ≈12; Czechia ≈11; Kazakhstan ≈10; Spain ≈10; Estonia ≈8; Lithuania ≈8	[M-S1]
25	Hungarian	2021–2023 (principally)	≈13,064	Hungary ≈11,868; Serbia ≈450; Romania ≈399; Slovakia ≈185; Ukraine ≈84; Slovenia ≈59; Austria ≈10; Croatia ≈9	[M-S1]
26	Bengali	2021–2023 (principally)	≈13,002	Bangladesh ≈7,200; India ≈5,700; United Kingdom ≈87; United States ≈15	[M-S1]
27	Catalan/Valencian	2021–2023 (principally)	≈12,997	Spain ≈12,997	[M-S1]
28	Bulgarian	2021–2023 (principally)	≈12,371	Bulgaria ≈12,267; Moldova ≈34; Ukraine ≈34; Serbia ≈15; Greece ≈10; Spain ≈6; Turkey ≈5	[M-S1]
29	Norwegian Bokmål	2021–2023 (principally)	≈11,698	Norway ≈11,698	[M-S1]
30	Malay	2021–2023 (principally)	≈11,341	Malaysia ≈9,945; Singapore ≈1,086; Brunei ≈275; Thailand ≈35	[M-S1]
31	Danish	2021–2023 (principally)	≈11,204	Denmark ≈11,147; Norway ≈35; Germany ≈22	[M-S1]
32	Albanian	2021–2023 (principally)	≈9,712	Albania ≈8,671; Kosovo ≈425; North Macedonia ≈272; Serbia ≈150; Italy ≈77; Montenegro ≈70; Greece ≈31; Switzerland ≈9; Turkey ≈7	[M-S1]
33	Hebrew	2021–2023 (principally)	≈9,470	Israel ≈9,079; United States ≈139; France ≈130; Iran ≈20; Turkey ≈20; Brazil ≈18; Russia ≈18; Italy ≈10; United Kingdom ≈10; Poland ≈8; Germany ≈6; Azerbaijan ≈4; Spain ≈4; Estonia ≈2; Uruguay ≈2	[M-S1]
34	Finnish	2021–2023 (principally)	≈9,130	Finland ≈9,037; Sweden ≈78; Estonia ≈15	[M-S1]
35	Slovenian	2021–2023 (principally)	≈8,824	Slovenia ≈8,809; Austria ≈15	[M-S1]
36	Swedish	2021–2023 (principally)	≈8,400	Sweden ≈7,017; Finland ≈1,323; Norway ≈41; Denmark ≈15; Estonia ≈4	[M-S1]
37	Lithuanian	2021–2023 (principally)	≈8,379	Lithuania ≈8,321; United Kingdom ≈35; Poland ≈16; Belarus ≈4; Ireland ≈3	[M-S1]
38	Croatian	2021–2023 (principally)	≈7,887	Croatia ≈7,236; Bosnia and Herzegovina ≈519; Serbia ≈45; Montenegro ≈35; Slovenia ≈31; Hungary ≈11; Italy ≈10	[M-S1]
39	Azerbaijani	2021–2023 (principally)	≈7,364	Azerbaijan ≈5,509; Iran ≈1,800; Russia ≈55	[M-S1]
40	Tamil	2021–2023 (principally)	≈6,740	India ≈4,750; Singapore ≈724; Sri Lanka ≈689; Malaysia ≈542; Mauritius ≈20; France ≈15	[M-S1]
41	Slovak	2021–2023 (principally)	≈5,924	Slovakia ≈5,746; Czechia ≈80; Serbia ≈54; Hungary ≈18; Romania ≈16; Poland ≈10	[M-S1]
42	Kurdish	2021–2023 (principally)	≈5,554	Turkey ≈3,018; Iran ≈1,800; Iraq ≈600; Syria ≈110; Sweden ≈16; Germany ≈10	[M-S1]
43	Mongolian	2021–2023 (principally)	≈5,158	Mongolia ≈3,662; China ≈1,492; South Korea ≈4	[M-S1]
44	Estonian	2021–2023 (principally)	≈4,954	Estonia ≈4,939; Finland ≈15	[M-S1]
45	Galician	2021–2023 (principally)	≈4,874	Spain ≈4,874	[M-S1]
46	Telugu	2021–2023 (principally)	≈4,765	India ≈4,750; Malaysia ≈12; Mauritius ≈3	[M-S1]
47	Marathi	2021–2023 (principally)	≈4,755	India ≈4,750; Mauritius ≈5	[M-S1]
48	Uyghur	2021–2023 (principally)	≈4,173	China ≈4,144; Kazakhstan ≈25; Kyrgyzstan ≈4	[M-S1]
49	Tibetan	2021–2023 (principally)	≈4,144	China ≈4,144	[M-S1]
50	Armenian	2021–2023 (principally)	≈3,916	Armenia ≈3,333; Iran ≈306; Turkey ≈121; Russia ≈65; France ≈35; Bulgaria ≈16; Syria ≈15; United States ≈15; Brazil ≈6; Poland ≈3; Uruguay ≈1	[M-S1]
51	Malayalam	2021–2023 (principally)	≈3,840	India ≈3,800; United Arab Emirates ≈30; Malaysia ≈10	[M-S1]
52	Georgian	2021–2023 (principally)	≈3,382	Georgia ≈3,311; Turkey ≈23; Russia ≈22; Iran ≈20; Azerbaijan ≈6	[M-S1]
53	Urdu	2021–2023 (principally)	≈3,293	India ≈1,900; Pakistan ≈1,125; United Kingdom ≈173; Bangladesh ≈45; United Arab Emirates ≈40; Mauritius ≈10	[M-S1]
54	Basque	2021–2023 (principally)	≈3,289	Spain ≈3,249; France ≈40	[M-S1]
55	Kazakh	2021–2023 (principally)	≈3,267	Kazakhstan ≈2,700; China ≈497; Russia ≈60; Uzbekistan ≈8; Kyrgyzstan ≈2	[M-S1]
56	Latvian	2021–2023 (principally)	≈2,978	Latvia ≈2,970; Estonia ≈6; Lithuania ≈2	[M-S1]
57	Gujarati	2021–2023 (principally)	≈2,888	India ≈2,850; United Kingdom ≈25; United States ≈10; Portugal ≈3	[M-S1]
58	Kannada	2021–2023 (principally)	≈2,850	India ≈2,850	[M-S1]
59	Javanese	2021–2023 (principally)	≈2,676	Indonesia ≈2,672; Malaysia ≈4	[M-S1]
60	Belarusian	2021–2023 (principally)	≈2,300	Belarus ≈2,205; Russia ≈50; Poland ≈35; Lithuania ≈10	[M-S1]
61	Filipino	2021–2023 (principally)	≈2,027	Philippines ≈2,027	[M-S1]
62	Burmese	2021–2023 (principally)	≈1,930	Myanmar ≈1,916; Thailand ≈14	[M-S1]
63	Nepali	2021–2023 (principally)	≈1,680	Nepal ≈1,625; India ≈45; Japan ≈6; Australia ≈4	[M-S1]
64	Sinhala	2021–2023 (principally)	≈1,652	Sri Lanka ≈1,652	[M-S1]
65	Welsh	2021–2023 (principally)	≈1,612	United Kingdom ≈1,601; Argentina ≈11	[M-S1]
66	Afrikaans	2021–2023 (principally)	≈1,483	South Africa ≈1,440; Namibia ≈43	[M-S1]
67	Norwegian Nynorsk	2021–2023 (principally)	≈1,462	Norway ≈1,462	[M-S1]
68	Bosnian	2021–2023 (principally)	≈1,374	Bosnia and Herzegovina ≈973; Serbia ≈300; Montenegro ≈70; Slovenia ≈20; Turkey ≈8; North Macedonia ≈3	[M-S1]
69	Khmer	2021–2023 (principally)	≈1,339	Cambodia ≈1,275; Vietnam ≈50; Thailand ≈14	[M-S1]
70	Uzbek	2021–2023 (principally)	≈1,265	Uzbekistan ≈1,110; Afghanistan ≈50; Kazakhstan ≈35; Kyrgyzstan ≈35; Tajikistan ≈35	[M-S1]
71	Punjabi	2021–2023 (principally)	≈1,242	India ≈760; Pakistan ≈200; United Kingdom ≈144; Australia ≈53; Malaysia ≈40; Canada ≈30; United States ≈15	[M-S1]
72	Odia	2021–2023 (principally)	≈1,140	India ≈1,140	[M-S1]
73	Icelandic	2021–2023 (principally)	≈1,132	Iceland ≈1,132	[M-S1]
74	Macedonian	2021–2023 (principally)	≈1,024	North Macedonia ≈1,019; Albania ≈5	[M-S1]
75	Sundanese	2021–2023 (principally)	≈908	Indonesia ≈908	[M-S1]
76	Swahili	2021–2023 (principally)	≈877	Kenya ≈766; Uganda ≈75; Rwanda ≈20; Democratic Republic of the Congo ≈12; Burundi ≈4	[M-S1]
77	Assamese	2021–2023 (principally)	≈855	India ≈855	[M-S1]
78	Other / residual languages	2021–2023 (principally)	≈841	Belarus ≈49; Norway ≈47; Serbia ≈42; Ukraine ≈42; Netherlands ≈39; Colombia ≈37; Argentina ≈34; Bangladesh ≈34; Moldova ≈32; Canada ≈29; Denmark ≈29; Bulgaria ≈28; Romania ≈28; Greece ≈24; Hungary ≈22; Belgium ≈21; Croatia ≈21; Nepal ≈20; Finland ≈19; Kazakhstan ≈19; United Arab Emirates ≈19; Chile ≈16; Ecuador ≈16; Israel ≈16; Thailand ≈16; Czechia ≈15; Egypt ≈15; Iraq ≈15; Austria ≈14; Sweden ≈14; Luxembourg ≈11; Slovenia ≈11; Switzerland ≈11; Peru ≈10; Slovakia ≈10; Albania ≈7; Syria ≈5; Mauritius ≈4	[M-S1]
79	Hausa	2021–2023 (principally)	≈840	Nigeria ≈840	[M-S1]
80	Yoruba	2021–2023 (principally)	≈840	Nigeria ≈840	[M-S1]
81	Tatar	2021–2023 (principally)	≈835	Russia ≈816; Kazakhstan ≈16; Poland ≈3	[M-S1]
82	Quechua	2021–2023 (principally)	≈805	Peru ≈560; Bolivia ≈245	[M-S1]
83	Taiwanese, Hakka and Indigenous languages	2021–2023 (principally)	≈800	Taiwan ≈800	[M-S1]
84	Tajik	2021–2023 (principally)	≈768	Tajikistan ≈750; Uzbekistan ≈15; Kyrgyzstan ≈3	[M-S1]
85	Kyrgyz	2021–2023 (principally)	≈726	Kyrgyzstan ≈552; China ≈166; Tajikistan ≈5; Uzbekistan ≈3	[M-S1]
86	Igbo	2021–2023 (principally)	≈700	Nigeria ≈700	[M-S1]
87	Montenegrin	2021–2023 (principally)	≈696	Montenegro ≈696	[M-S1]
88	Tamazight	2021–2023 (principally)	≈648	Morocco ≈350; Algeria ≈298	[M-S1]
89	Turkmen	2021–2023 (principally)	≈602	Turkmenistan ≈450; Iran ≈108; Iraq ≈26; Afghanistan ≈12; Tajikistan ≈4; Uzbekistan ≈2	[M-S1]
90	Other languages	2021–2023 (principally)	≈520	Italy ≈39; Iran ≈36; Latvia ≈36; Russia ≈33; United Kingdom ≈29; Brazil ≈26; United States ≈25; Bosnia and Herzegovina ≈22; Cyprus ≈22; Dominican Republic ≈19; Paraguay ≈19; Cuba ≈16; Iceland ≈13; Japan ≈12; Namibia ≈12; Spain ≈12; Zimbabwe ≈12; Turkmenistan ≈10; Malaysia ≈8; El Salvador ≈7; Germany ≈6; Guatemala ≈6; Mali ≈6; Poland ≈6; North Korea ≈5; Turkey ≈5; Benin ≈4; Bolivia ≈4; Burkina Faso ≈4; Estonia ≈4; Fiji ≈4; Guinea ≈4; Madagascar ≈4; Congo, Republic of the ≈3; Costa Rica ≈3; Guinea-Bissau ≈3; Ireland ≈3; Lithuania ≈3; Portugal ≈3; San Marino ≈3; Australia ≈2; Azerbaijan ≈2; Cambodia ≈2; Central African Republic ≈2; Montenegro ≈2; New Zealand ≈2; North Macedonia ≈2; Pakistan ≈2; South Korea ≈2; Timor-Leste ≈2; Togo ≈2; Venezuela ≈2; Democratic Republic of the Congo ≈1; Palau ≈1; Tajikistan ≈1; Uruguay ≈1; Uzbekistan ≈1	[M-S1]
91	Pashto	2021–2023 (principally)	≈475	Afghanistan ≈400; Pakistan ≈75	[M-S1]
92	Lao	2021–2023 (principally)	≈474	Laos ≈450; Thailand ≈21; Cambodia ≈3	[M-S1]
93	Dari	2021–2023 (principally)	≈450	Afghanistan ≈450	[M-S1]
94	Luxembourgish	2021–2023 (principally)	≈444	Luxembourg ≈444	[M-S1]
95	Amharic	2021–2023 (principally)	≈439	Ethiopia ≈428; Israel ≈11	[M-S1]
96	Sanskrit	2021–2023 (principally)	≈427	India ≈427	[M-S1]
97	Kiswahili	2021–2023 (principally)	≈421	Tanzania ≈421	[M-S1]
98	Bashkir	2021–2023 (principally)	≈408	Russia ≈408	[M-S1]
99	Maithili	2021–2023 (principally)	≈375	India ≈285; Nepal ≈90	[M-S1]
100	Yi (Nuosu)	2021–2023 (principally)	≈373	China ≈373	[M-S1]
101	Balinese	2021–2023 (principally)	≈347	Indonesia ≈347	[M-S1]
102	isiZulu	2021–2023 (principally)	≈345	South Africa ≈345	[M-S1]
103	Scottish Gaelic	2021–2023 (principally)	≈320	United Kingdom ≈320	[M-S1]
104	Somali	2021–2023 (principally)	≈314	Djibouti ≈164; Somalia ≈85; Sweden ≈20; Kenya ≈15; United Kingdom ≈12; Finland ≈10; United States ≈8	[M-S1]
105	Sindhi	2021–2023 (principally)	≈293	Pakistan ≈150; India ≈143	[M-S1]
106	Zhuang	2021–2023 (principally)	≈290	China ≈290	[M-S1]
107	isiXhosa	2021–2023 (principally)	≈288	South Africa ≈288	[M-S1]
108	Kichwa	2021–2023 (principally)	≈269	Ecuador ≈269	[M-S1]
109	Irish	2021–2023 (principally)	≈266	Ireland ≈256; United Kingdom ≈10	[M-S1]
110	Indigenous languages	2021–2023 (principally)	≈265	Brazil ≈115; United States ≈93; Papua New Guinea ≈30; Argentina ≈20; Solomon Islands ≈5; Vanuatu ≈2	[M-S1]
111	Aymara	2021–2023 (principally)	≈253	Bolivia ≈163; Peru ≈80; Chile ≈10	[M-S1]
112	Baluchi	2021–2023 (principally)	≈252	Iran ≈252	[M-S1]
113	Maltese	2021–2023 (principally)	≈237	Malta ≈237	[M-S1]
114	Cebuano	2021–2023 (principally)	≈220	Philippines ≈220	[M-S1]
115	Chuvash	2021–2023 (principally)	≈220	Russia ≈220	[M-S1]
116	Gilaki	2021–2023 (principally)	≈216	Iran ≈216	[M-S1]
117	Madurese	2021–2023 (principally)	≈214	Indonesia ≈214	[M-S1]
118	Mauritian Creole	2021–2023 (principally)	≈206	Mauritius ≈206	[M-S1]
119	Māori	2021–2023 (principally)	≈206	New Zealand ≈206	[M-S1]
120	Sardinian	2021–2023 (principally)	≈205	Italy ≈205	[M-S1]
121	Mazandarani	2021–2023 (principally)	≈198	Iran ≈198	[M-S1]
122	Kashmiri	2021–2023 (principally)	≈197	India ≈190; Pakistan ≈7	[M-S1]
123	English and Russian	2021–2023 (principally)	≈193	Mongolia ≈193	[M-S1]
124	Haitian Creole	2021–2023 (principally)	≈192	Haiti ≈135; France ≈35; United States ≈18; Brazil ≈4	[M-S1]
125	Konkani	2021–2023 (principally)	≈190	India ≈190	[M-S1]
126	Manipuri (Meitei)	2021–2023 (principally)	≈190	India ≈190	[M-S1]
127	Chechen	2021–2023 (principally)	≈189	Russia ≈184; Turkey ≈5	[M-S1]
128	Batak languages	2021–2023 (principally)	≈187	Indonesia ≈187	[M-S1]
129	Minangkabau	2021–2023 (principally)	≈187	Indonesia ≈187	[M-S1]
130	Nahuatl	2021–2023 (principally)	≈187	Mexico ≈187	[M-S1]
131	Kinyarwanda	2021–2023 (principally)	≈180	Rwanda ≈180	[M-S1]
132	Luri	2021–2023 (principally)	≈180	Iran ≈180	[M-S1]
133	Setswana	2021–2023 (principally)	≈180	Botswana ≈99; South Africa ≈81	[M-S1]
134	Sesotho	2021–2023 (principally)	≈159	South Africa ≈115; Lesotho ≈44	[M-S1]
135	Ethnic-minority languages	2021–2023 (principally)	≈158	Myanmar ≈158	[M-S1]
136	Oromo	2021–2023 (principally)	≈155	Ethiopia ≈155	[M-S1]
137	Friulian	2021–2023 (principally)	≈154	Italy ≈154	[M-S1]
138	Guaraní	2021–2023 (principally)	≈153	Paraguay ≈98; Bolivia ≈45; Brazil ≈10	[M-S1]
139	Luganda	2021–2023 (principally)	≈151	Uganda ≈151	[M-S1]
140	Avar	2021–2023 (principally)	≈150	Russia ≈147; Azerbaijan ≈3	[M-S1]
141	Romani	2021–2023 (principally)	≈148	Bulgaria ≈44; Serbia ≈30; Romania ≈26; Slovakia ≈10; Italy ≈8; Slovenia ≈6; North Macedonia ≈5; Poland ≈5; Turkey ≈5; Czechia ≈4; Spain ≈3; Montenegro ≈2	[M-S1]
142	Sakha (Yakut)	2021–2023 (principally)	≈147	Russia ≈147	[M-S1]
143	Dzongkha	2021–2023 (principally)	≈138	Bhutan ≈138	[M-S1]
144	Acehnese	2021–2023 (principally)	≈134	Indonesia ≈134	[M-S1]
145	Buginese	2021–2023 (principally)	≈134	Indonesia ≈134	[M-S1]
146	Catalan	2021–2023 (principally)	≈134	Andorra ≈89; France ≈35; Italy ≈10	[M-S1]
147	Tok Pisin	2021–2023 (principally)	≈120	Papua New Guinea ≈120	[M-S1]
148	Scots	2021–2023 (principally)	≈115	United Kingdom ≈115	[M-S1]
149	Sepedi	2021–2023 (principally)	≈115	South Africa ≈115	[M-S1]
150	Mari languages	2021–2023 (principally)	≈110	Russia ≈110	[M-S1]
151	Udmurt	2021–2023 (principally)	≈110	Russia ≈110	[M-S1]
152	Santali	2021–2023 (principally)	≈109	India ≈95; Bangladesh ≈14	[M-S1]
153	Yiddish	2021–2023 (principally)	≈109	United Kingdom ≈29; Israel ≈20; United States ≈16; Brazil ≈12; Poland ≈12; Belarus ≈9; Moldova ≈5; Germany ≈3; Lithuania ≈3	[M-S1]
154	Assyrian Neo-Aramaic	2021–2023 (principally)	≈108	Iran ≈108	[M-S1]
155	Northern Sami	2021–2023 (principally)	≈104	Norway ≈79; Finland ≈25	[M-S1]
156	Slovene	2021–2023 (principally)	≈103	Italy ≈103	[M-S1]
157	Malagasy	2021–2023 (principally)	≈102	Madagascar ≈102	[M-S1]
158	Sicilian	2021–2023 (principally)	≈100	Italy ≈100	[M-S1]
159	Ilocano	2021–2023 (principally)	≈99	Philippines ≈99	[M-S1]
160	Other Indigenous languages	2021–2023 (principally)	≈98	Colombia ≈32; Canada ≈23; Mexico ≈19; Peru ≈13; Ecuador ≈11	[M-S1]
161	Bhojpuri	2021–2023 (principally)	≈95	India ≈35; Nepal ≈35; Mauritius ≈25	[M-S1]
162	Bodo	2021–2023 (principally)	≈95	India ≈95	[M-S1]
163	Dogri	2021–2023 (principally)	≈95	India ≈95	[M-S1]
164	Dhivehi	2021–2023 (principally)	≈93	Maldives ≈93	[M-S1]
165	Kirundi	2021–2023 (principally)	≈90	Burundi ≈90	[M-S1]
166	Latin	2021–2023 (principally)	≈84	Vatican City ≈75; Brazil ≈5; Poland ≈4	[M-S1]
167	Xibe	2021–2023 (principally)	≈83	China ≈83	[M-S1]
168	Indigenous Australian languages	2021–2023 (principally)	≈82	Australia ≈82	[M-S1]
169	Frisian	2021–2023 (principally)	≈81	Netherlands ≈81	[M-S1]
170	Hiligaynon	2021–2023 (principally)	≈81	Philippines ≈81	[M-S1]
171	Neapolitan	2021–2023 (principally)	≈80	Italy ≈80	[M-S1]
172	Romansh	2021–2023 (principally)	≈80	Switzerland ≈80	[M-S1]
173	Iban	2021–2023 (principally)	≈79	Malaysia ≈79	[M-S1]
174	Komi	2021–2023 (principally)	≈74	Russia ≈74	[M-S1]
175	Tagalog	2021–2023 (principally)	≈74	United States ≈40; United Arab Emirates ≈16; Japan ≈10; Australia ≈8	[M-S1]
176	Akan languages	2021–2023 (principally)	≈73	Ghana ≈73	[M-S1]
177	Buryat	2021–2023 (principally)	≈73	Russia ≈73	[M-S1]
178	Efik-Ibibio	2021–2023 (principally)	≈72	Nigeria ≈72	[M-S1]
179	Sasak	2021–2023 (principally)	≈70	Indonesia ≈70	[M-S1]
180	Occitan	2021–2023 (principally)	≈69	France ≈51; Italy ≈18	[M-S1]
181	Zaza	2021–2023 (principally)	≈68	Turkey ≈68	[M-S1]
182	Syriac / Neo-Aramaic	2021–2023 (principally)	≈67	Turkey ≈38; Iraq ≈19; Syria ≈10	[M-S1]
183	XiTsonga	2021–2023 (principally)	≈66	South Africa ≈66	[M-S1]
184	Asturian	2021–2023 (principally)	≈65	Spain ≈65	[M-S1]
185	Yucatec Maya	2021–2023 (principally)	≈65	Mexico ≈65	[M-S1]
186	Tetum	2021–2023 (principally)	≈63	Timor-Leste ≈45; Indonesia ≈15; Portugal ≈3	[M-S1]
187	Tiv	2021–2023 (principally)	≈63	Nigeria ≈63	[M-S1]
188	Fulfulde	2021–2023 (principally)	≈62	Nigeria ≈34; Cameroon ≈24; Burkina Faso ≈4	[M-S1]
189	Kikuyu	2021–2023 (principally)	≈61	Kenya ≈61	[M-S1]
190	Fijian	2021–2023 (principally)	≈60	Fiji ≈60	[M-S1]
191	Ivorian languages (combined)	2021–2023 (principally)	≈60	Côte d’Ivoire ≈60	[M-S1]
192	Makassarese	2021–2023 (principally)	≈60	Indonesia ≈60	[M-S1]
193	Venetian	2021–2023 (principally)	≈60	Italy ≈60	[M-S1]
194	Crimean Tatar	2021–2023 (principally)	≈59	Ukraine ≈59	[M-S1]
195	Gagauz	2021–2023 (principally)	≈59	Moldova ≈59	[M-S1]
196	Waray	2021–2023 (principally)	≈58	Philippines ≈58	[M-S1]
197	Wayuu	2021–2023 (principally)	≈56	Colombia ≈46; Venezuela ≈10	[M-S1]
198	Banjarese	2021–2023 (principally)	≈55	Indonesia ≈55	[M-S1]
199	Breton	2021–2023 (principally)	≈55	France ≈55	[M-S1]
200	Newar (Nepal Bhasa)	2021–2023 (principally)	≈55	Nepal ≈55	[M-S1]
201	siSwati	2021–2023 (principally)	≈55	South Africa ≈55	[M-S1]
202	Kadazan-Dusun	2021–2023 (principally)	≈54	Malaysia ≈54	[M-S1]
203	Shona	2021–2023 (principally)	≈54	Zimbabwe ≈54	[M-S1]
204	Bikol languages	2021–2023 (principally)	≈52	Philippines ≈52	[M-S1]
205	Bosnian / Croatian / Serbian	2021–2023 (principally)	≈51	Austria ≈30; Switzerland ≈21	[M-S1]
206	K’iche’	2021–2023 (principally)	≈51	Guatemala ≈51	[M-S1]
207	Ladin	2021–2023 (principally)	≈51	Italy ≈51	[M-S1]
208	English and other languages	2021–2023 (principally)	≈50	Kosovo ≈25; Liechtenstein ≈15; Yemen ≈10	[M-S1]
209	Kanuri	2021–2023 (principally)	≈50	Nigeria ≈50	[M-S1]
210	Samoan	2021–2023 (principally)	≈50	Samoa ≈33; New Zealand ≈12; Australia ≈5	[M-S1]
211	Tahitian	2021–2023 (principally)	≈50	France ≈50	[M-S1]
212	Inuktitut	2021–2023 (principally)	≈49	Canada ≈49	[M-S1]
213	Other Ghanaian languages	2021–2023 (principally)	≈49	Ghana ≈49	[M-S1]
214	Tshivenda	2021–2023 (principally)	≈49	South Africa ≈49	[M-S1]
215	Cree languages	2021–2023 (principally)	≈46	Canada ≈46	[M-S1]
216	Tigrinya	2021–2023 (principally)	≈46	Ethiopia ≈39; Eritrea ≈7	[M-S1]
217	Alsatian	2021–2023 (principally)	≈45	France ≈45	[M-S1]
218	Bambara	2021–2023 (principally)	≈45	Mali ≈45	[M-S1]
219	German, French, Spanish and other languages	2021–2023 (principally)	≈45	Vatican City ≈45	[M-S1]
220	Kanak languages	2021–2023 (principally)	≈45	France ≈45	[M-S1]
221	Lampung	2021–2023 (principally)	≈45	Indonesia ≈45	[M-S1]
222	Mordvin languages	2021–2023 (principally)	≈45	Russia ≈45	[M-S1]
223	Other / residual Indigenous languages	2021–2023 (principally)	≈45	Mexico ≈45	[M-S1]
224	Swazi	2021–2023 (principally)	≈45	Eswatini ≈45	[M-S1]
225	Corsican	2021–2023 (principally)	≈44	France ≈44	[M-S1]
226	Hmong	2021–2023 (principally)	≈44	Vietnam ≈44	[M-S1]
227	Edo	2021–2023 (principally)	≈42	Nigeria ≈42	[M-S1]
228	Lezgian	2021–2023 (principally)	≈42	Russia ≈32; Azerbaijan ≈10	[M-S1]
229	Afar	2021–2023 (principally)	≈41	Djibouti ≈41	[M-S1]
230	Tay	2021–2023 (principally)	≈41	Vietnam ≈41	[M-S1]
231	Chichewa	2021–2023 (principally)	≈40	Malawi ≈40	[M-S1]
232	Kalmyk	2021–2023 (principally)	≈40	Russia ≈40	[M-S1]
233	Karakalpak	2021–2023 (principally)	≈40	Uzbekistan ≈40	[M-S1]
234	Mazatec	2021–2023 (principally)	≈40	Mexico ≈40	[M-S1]
235	Minahasan languages	2021–2023 (principally)	≈40	Indonesia ≈40	[M-S1]
236	Piedmontese	2021–2023 (principally)	≈40	Italy ≈40	[M-S1]
237	Seychellois Creole	2021–2023 (principally)	≈40	Seychelles ≈40	[M-S1]
238	Dholuo	2021–2023 (principally)	≈39	Kenya ≈39	[M-S1]
239	Jamaican Creole	2021–2023 (principally)	≈39	Jamaica ≈39	[M-S1]
240	Other Ethiopian languages	2021–2023 (principally)	≈39	Ethiopia ≈39	[M-S1]
241	Ewondo	2021–2023 (principally)	≈38	Cameroon ≈38	[M-S1]
242	Ingush	2021–2023 (principally)	≈38	Russia ≈38	[M-S1]
243	Q’eqchi’	2021–2023 (principally)	≈38	Guatemala ≈38	[M-S1]
244	Ewe	2021–2023 (principally)	≈37	Ghana ≈37	[M-S1]
245	Ossetian	2021–2023 (principally)	≈37	Russia ≈37	[M-S1]
246	isiNdebele	2021–2023 (principally)	≈37	South Africa ≈37	[M-S1]
247	Armenian, Azerbaijani and other languages	2021–2023 (principally)	≈36	Georgia ≈36	[M-S1]
248	Fiji Hindi	2021–2023 (principally)	≈36	Fiji ≈36	[M-S1]
249	Mixtec languages	2021–2023 (principally)	≈36	Mexico ≈36	[M-S1]
250	Other minority and foreign languages	2021–2023 (principally)	≈36	China ≈36	[M-S1]
251	Rusyn	2021–2023 (principally)	≈36	Serbia ≈36	[M-S1]
252	Chol	2021–2023 (principally)	≈35	Mexico ≈35	[M-S1]
253	Coptic	2021–2023 (principally)	≈35	Egypt ≈35	[M-S1]
254	Kabardian-Cherkess	2021–2023 (principally)	≈35	Russia ≈35	[M-S1]
255	Kapampangan	2021–2023 (principally)	≈35	Philippines ≈35	[M-S1]
256	Kumyk	2021–2023 (principally)	≈35	Russia ≈35	[M-S1]
257	Lombard	2021–2023 (principally)	≈35	Italy ≈35	[M-S1]
258	Manchu	2021–2023 (principally)	≈35	China ≈35	[M-S1]
259	Mapudungun	2021–2023 (principally)	≈35	Chile ≈35	[M-S1]
260	Ngaju	2021–2023 (principally)	≈35	Indonesia ≈35	[M-S1]
261	Other Indian languages	2021–2023 (principally)	≈35	India ≈35	[M-S1]
262	Rajasthani	2021–2023 (principally)	≈35	India ≈35	[M-S1]
263	Rejang	2021–2023 (principally)	≈35	Indonesia ≈35	[M-S1]
264	Runyankore-Rukiga	2021–2023 (principally)	≈35	Uganda ≈35	[M-S1]
265	Toraja languages	2021–2023 (principally)	≈35	Indonesia ≈35	[M-S1]
266	Wolof	2021–2023 (principally)	≈33	France ≈20; Senegal ≈13	[M-S1]
267	Aragonese	2021–2023 (principally)	≈32	Spain ≈32	[M-S1]
268	Nasa Yuwe	2021–2023 (principally)	≈32	Colombia ≈32	[M-S1]
269	Zapotec languages	2021–2023 (principally)	≈32	Mexico ≈32	[M-S1]
270	Cape Verdean Creole	2021–2023 (principally)	≈31	Portugal ≈19; Cabo Verde ≈12	[M-S1]
271	Chakma	2021–2023 (principally)	≈31	Bangladesh ≈31	[M-S1]
272	Kamba	2021–2023 (principally)	≈31	Kenya ≈31	[M-S1]
273	Kashubian	2021–2023 (principally)	≈31	Poland ≈31	[M-S1]
274	Betawi	2021–2023 (principally)	≈30	Indonesia ≈30	[M-S1]
275	Circassian languages	2021–2023 (principally)	≈30	Turkey ≈30	[M-S1]
276	Dargwa	2021–2023 (principally)	≈30	Russia ≈30	[M-S1]
277	Duala	2021–2023 (principally)	≈30	Cameroon ≈30	[M-S1]
278	Emilian-Romagnol	2021–2023 (principally)	≈30	Italy ≈30	[M-S1]
279	Laz	2021–2023 (principally)	≈30	Turkey ≈30	[M-S1]
280	Mixe	2021–2023 (principally)	≈30	Mexico ≈30	[M-S1]
281	Mizo	2021–2023 (principally)	≈30	India ≈30	[M-S1]
282	Naxi	2021–2023 (principally)	≈30	China ≈30	[M-S1]
283	Qashqai	2021–2023 (principally)	≈30	Iran ≈30	[M-S1]
284	Talysh	2021–2023 (principally)	≈30	Iran ≈25; Azerbaijan ≈5	[M-S1]
285	Luhya languages	2021–2023 (principally)	≈29	Kenya ≈29	[M-S1]
286	Orang Asli languages	2021–2023 (principally)	≈29	Malaysia ≈29	[M-S1]
287	Other regional, overseas and immigrant languages	2021–2023 (principally)	≈29	France ≈29	[M-S1]
288	Tongan	2021–2023 (principally)	≈29	Tonga ≈24; New Zealand ≈5	[M-S1]
289	Balochi	2021–2023 (principally)	≈28	Pakistan ≈20; Afghanistan ≈8	[M-S1]
290	Hmong/Miao languages	2021–2023 (principally)	≈28	China ≈28	[M-S1]
291	Lak	2021–2023 (principally)	≈28	Russia ≈28	[M-S1]
292	Tuvan	2021–2023 (principally)	≈28	Russia ≈28	[M-S1]
293	Mam	2021–2023 (principally)	≈26	Guatemala ≈26	[M-S1]
294	Mirandese	2021–2023 (principally)	≈26	Portugal ≈26	[M-S1]
295	Ojibwe	2021–2023 (principally)	≈26	Canada ≈26	[M-S1]
296	Acholi	2021–2023 (principally)	≈25	Uganda ≈25	[M-S1]
297	Amazigh languages	2021–2023 (principally)	≈25	France ≈25	[M-S1]
298	Antillean Creole	2021–2023 (principally)	≈25	France ≈25	[M-S1]
299	Ateso	2021–2023 (principally)	≈25	Uganda ≈25	[M-S1]
300	Brahui	2021–2023 (principally)	≈25	Iran ≈15; Pakistan ≈10	[M-S1]
301	Chinantec languages	2021–2023 (principally)	≈25	Mexico ≈25	[M-S1]
302	Dai languages	2021–2023 (principally)	≈25	China ≈25	[M-S1]
303	Dong	2021–2023 (principally)	≈25	China ≈25	[M-S1]
304	English Creole, Miskito and other languages	2021–2023 (principally)	≈25	Nicaragua ≈25	[M-S1]
305	French and other languages	2021–2023 (principally)	≈25	Laos ≈25	[M-S1]
306	Gorontalo	2021–2023 (principally)	≈25	Indonesia ≈25	[M-S1]
307	Ijaw languages	2021–2023 (principally)	≈25	Nigeria ≈25	[M-S1]
308	Khasi	2021–2023 (principally)	≈25	India ≈25	[M-S1]
309	Ligurian	2021–2023 (principally)	≈25	Italy ≈25	[M-S1]
310	Nigerian Pidgin	2021–2023 (principally)	≈25	Nigeria ≈25	[M-S1]
311	Nupe	2021–2023 (principally)	≈25	Nigeria ≈25	[M-S1]
312	Réunion Creole	2021–2023 (principally)	≈25	France ≈25	[M-S1]
313	Sudanese languages (combined)	2021–2023 (principally)	≈25	Sudan ≈25	[M-S1]
314	Tharu languages	2021–2023 (principally)	≈25	Nepal ≈25	[M-S1]
315	Fulfulde, Songhay and Tamasheq	2021–2023 (principally)	≈24	Mali ≈24	[M-S1]
316	Ga	2021–2023 (principally)	≈24	Ghana ≈24	[M-S1]
317	Jarai	2021–2023 (principally)	≈24	Vietnam ≈24	[M-S1]
318	Ndebele	2021–2023 (principally)	≈24	Zimbabwe ≈24	[M-S1]
319	Other / residual Cameroonian languages	2021–2023 (principally)	≈24	Cameroon ≈24	[M-S1]
320	Altai	2021–2023 (principally)	≈23	Russia ≈23	[M-S1]
321	Bislama	2021–2023 (principally)	≈23	Vanuatu ≈23	[M-S1]
322	Embera languages	2021–2023 (principally)	≈23	Colombia ≈23	[M-S1]
323	Khakas	2021–2023 (principally)	≈23	Russia ≈23	[M-S1]
324	Oshiwambo	2021–2023 (principally)	≈23	Namibia ≈23	[M-S1]
325	Huastec	2021–2023 (principally)	≈22	Mexico ≈22	[M-S1]
326	Kalenjin languages	2021–2023 (principally)	≈22	Kenya ≈22	[M-S1]
327	Other / residual Kenyan languages	2021–2023 (principally)	≈22	Kenya ≈22	[M-S1]
328	Solomon Islands Pijin	2021–2023 (principally)	≈22	Solomon Islands ≈22	[M-S1]
329	Ainu	2021–2023 (principally)	≈21	Japan ≈21	[M-S1]
330	Asháninka	2021–2023 (principally)	≈21	Peru ≈21	[M-S1]
331	Bahnar	2021–2023 (principally)	≈21	Vietnam ≈21	[M-S1]
332	Other Indonesian languages	2021–2023 (principally)	≈21	Indonesia ≈21	[M-S1]
333	Ambonese Malay	2021–2023 (principally)	≈20	Indonesia ≈20	[M-S1]
334	English, Italian and other languages	2021–2023 (principally)	≈20	Monaco ≈20	[M-S1]
335	Greek/Griko	2021–2023 (principally)	≈20	Italy ≈20	[M-S1]
336	Hazaragi	2021–2023 (principally)	≈20	Afghanistan ≈20	[M-S1]
337	Hebrew / Yiddish	2021–2023 (principally)	≈20	Argentina ≈20	[M-S1]
338	Ikalanga and other languages	2021–2023 (principally)	≈20	Botswana ≈20	[M-S1]
339	Kaqchikel	2021–2023 (principally)	≈20	Guatemala ≈20	[M-S1]
340	Laki	2021–2023 (principally)	≈20	Iran ≈20	[M-S1]
341	Lisu	2021–2023 (principally)	≈20	China ≈20	[M-S1]
342	Lusoga	2021–2023 (principally)	≈20	Uganda ≈20	[M-S1]
343	Mandinka, Wolof and Fula	2021–2023 (principally)	≈20	Gambia ≈20	[M-S1]
344	Me’phaa/Tlapanec	2021–2023 (principally)	≈20	Mexico ≈20	[M-S1]
345	Nias	2021–2023 (principally)	≈20	Indonesia ≈20	[M-S1]
346	Other / residual Ugandan languages	2021–2023 (principally)	≈20	Uganda ≈20	[M-S1]
347	Papuan Malay	2021–2023 (principally)	≈20	Indonesia ≈20	[M-S1]
348	Tulu	2021–2023 (principally)	≈20	India ≈20	[M-S1]
349	Basaa	2021–2023 (principally)	≈19	Cameroon ≈19	[M-S1]
350	Shuar	2021–2023 (principally)	≈19	Ecuador ≈19	[M-S1]
351	Gbagyi	2021–2023 (principally)	≈18	Nigeria ≈18	[M-S1]
352	Judeo-Persian	2021–2023 (principally)	≈18	Iran ≈18	[M-S1]
353	Rarámuri/Tarahumara	2021–2023 (principally)	≈18	Mexico ≈18	[M-S1]
354	Saraiki	2021–2023 (principally)	≈18	Pakistan ≈18	[M-S1]
355	Other / residual Philippine languages	2021–2023 (principally)	≈17	Philippines ≈17	[M-S1]
356	Otomi	2021–2023 (principally)	≈17	Mexico ≈17	[M-S1]
357	Pangasinan	2021–2023 (principally)	≈17	Philippines ≈17	[M-S1]
358	Mooré	2021–2023 (principally)	≈16	Burkina Faso ≈16	[M-S1]
359	Bamum	2021–2023 (principally)	≈15	Cameroon ≈15	[M-S1]
360	Biak	2021–2023 (principally)	≈15	Indonesia ≈15	[M-S1]
361	Franco-Provençal	2021–2023 (principally)	≈15	Italy ≈15	[M-S1]
362	Garo	2021–2023 (principally)	≈15	India ≈15	[M-S1]
363	Guyanese Creole and Indigenous languages	2021–2023 (principally)	≈15	Guyana ≈15	[M-S1]
364	Hiri Motu	2021–2023 (principally)	≈15	Papua New Guinea ≈15	[M-S1]
365	Karelian	2021–2023 (principally)	≈15	Russia ≈15	[M-S1]
366	Kokborok	2021–2023 (principally)	≈15	India ≈15	[M-S1]
367	Krio	2021–2023 (principally)	≈15	Sierra Leone ≈15	[M-S1]
368	Mahoran languages	2021–2023 (principally)	≈15	France ≈15	[M-S1]
369	Mozambican languages (combined)	2021–2023 (principally)	≈15	Mozambique ≈15	[M-S1]
370	Runyoro-Rutooro	2021–2023 (principally)	≈15	Uganda ≈15	[M-S1]
371	Sarnami, Javanese and other languages	2021–2023 (principally)	≈15	Suriname ≈15	[M-S1]
372	Semnani	2021–2023 (principally)	≈15	Iran ≈15	[M-S1]
373	Sranan Tongo	2021–2023 (principally)	≈15	Suriname ≈15	[M-S1]
374	Tamang	2021–2023 (principally)	≈15	Nepal ≈15	[M-S1]
375	Tat	2021–2023 (principally)	≈15	Iran ≈15	[M-S1]
376	Tzeltal	2021–2023 (principally)	≈15	Mexico ≈15	[M-S1]
377	Tzotzil	2021–2023 (principally)	≈15	Mexico ≈15	[M-S1]
378	Wa	2021–2023 (principally)	≈15	China ≈15	[M-S1]
379	Wallisian and Futunan	2021–2023 (principally)	≈15	France ≈15	[M-S1]
380	Wixárika/Huichol	2021–2023 (principally)	≈15	Mexico ≈15	[M-S1]
381	Cornish	2021–2023 (principally)	≈14	United Kingdom ≈14	[M-S1]
382	English, Garifuna and other languages	2021–2023 (principally)	≈14	Honduras ≈14	[M-S1]
383	Idoma	2021–2023 (principally)	≈14	Nigeria ≈14	[M-S1]
384	Igala	2021–2023 (principally)	≈14	Nigeria ≈14	[M-S1]
385	Papiamento	2021–2023 (principally)	≈14	Netherlands ≈14	[M-S1]
386	Ryukyuan languages	2021–2023 (principally)	≈14	Japan ≈14	[M-S1]
387	Saint Lucian Creole French	2021–2023 (principally)	≈14	Saint Lucia ≈14	[M-S1]
388	Sorbian languages	2021–2023 (principally)	≈14	Germany ≈14	[M-S1]
389	Southern Sami	2021–2023 (principally)	≈14	Norway ≈14	[M-S1]
390	Cham	2021–2023 (principally)	≈12	Vietnam ≈7; Cambodia ≈5	[M-S1]
391	Chatino	2021–2023 (principally)	≈12	Mexico ≈12	[M-S1]
392	Dani languages	2021–2023 (principally)	≈12	Indonesia ≈12	[M-S1]
393	Gilbertese	2021–2023 (principally)	≈12	Kiribati ≈12	[M-S1]
394	Larestani	2021–2023 (principally)	≈12	Iran ≈12	[M-S1]
395	Lingala	2021–2023 (principally)	≈12	Democratic Republic of the Congo ≈12	[M-S1]
396	Lingala and Kituba	2021–2023 (principally)	≈12	Congo, Republic of the ≈12	[M-S1]
397	Lule Sami	2021–2023 (principally)	≈12	Norway ≈12	[M-S1]
398	Marshallese	2021–2023 (principally)	≈12	Marshall Islands ≈12	[M-S1]
399	Muong	2021–2023 (principally)	≈12	Vietnam ≈12	[M-S1]
400	Nepali and other languages	2021–2023 (principally)	≈12	Bhutan ≈12	[M-S1]
401	Other Nigerian languages	2021–2023 (principally)	≈12	Nigeria ≈12	[M-S1]
402	Pali	2021–2023 (principally)	≈12	India ≈12	[M-S1]
403	Shikomori	2021–2023 (principally)	≈12	Comoros ≈12	[M-S1]
404	Italian and other languages	2021–2023 (principally)	≈11	Malta ≈11	[M-S1]
405	Marma	2021–2023 (principally)	≈11	Bangladesh ≈11	[M-S1]
406	Amuzgo	2021–2023 (principally)	≈10	Mexico ≈10	[M-S1]
407	Berom	2021–2023 (principally)	≈10	Nigeria ≈10	[M-S1]
408	Chuukese, Pohnpeian, Yapese and Kosraean	2021–2023 (principally)	≈10	Micronesia ≈10	[M-S1]
409	Guianese Creole	2021–2023 (principally)	≈10	France ≈10	[M-S1]
410	Hunsrik	2021–2023 (principally)	≈10	Brazil ≈10	[M-S1]
411	Karen languages	2021–2023 (principally)	≈10	Thailand ≈10	[M-S1]
412	Liberian languages (combined)	2021–2023 (principally)	≈10	Liberia ≈10	[M-S1]
413	Limbu	2021–2023 (principally)	≈10	Nepal ≈10	[M-S1]
414	Lugbara	2021–2023 (principally)	≈10	Uganda ≈10	[M-S1]
415	Maninka	2021–2023 (principally)	≈10	Guinea ≈10	[M-S1]
416	Mundari	2021–2023 (principally)	≈10	India ≈10	[M-S1]
417	Nenets	2021–2023 (principally)	≈10	Russia ≈10	[M-S1]
418	Norwegian	2021–2023 (principally)	≈10	Denmark ≈10	[M-S1]
419	Nung	2021–2023 (principally)	≈10	Vietnam ≈10	[M-S1]
420	Pomeranian	2021–2023 (principally)	≈10	Brazil ≈10	[M-S1]
421	Pular	2021–2023 (principally)	≈10	Guinea ≈10	[M-S1]
422	Q’anjob’al	2021–2023 (principally)	≈10	Guatemala ≈10	[M-S1]
423	Salar	2021–2023 (principally)	≈10	China ≈10	[M-S1]
424	Sango	2021–2023 (principally)	≈10	Central African Republic ≈10	[M-S1]
425	Serbian / Montenegrin	2021–2023 (principally)	≈10	Albania ≈10	[M-S1]
426	Silesian	2021–2023 (principally)	≈10	Poland ≈10	[M-S1]
427	Tamazight and other languages	2021–2023 (principally)	≈10	Libya ≈10	[M-S1]
428	Tojolabal	2021–2023 (principally)	≈10	Mexico ≈10	[M-S1]
429	Turkish / Tatar	2021–2023 (principally)	≈10	Romania ≈10	[M-S1]
430	Ukrainian / Rusyn	2021–2023 (principally)	≈10	Slovakia ≈10	[M-S1]
431	Dioula	2021–2023 (principally)	≈9	Burkina Faso ≈9	[M-S1]
432	Esperanto	2021–2023 (principally)	≈9	Brazil ≈5; Poland ≈4	[M-S1]
433	French Creole	2021–2023 (principally)	≈9	Dominica ≈9	[M-S1]
434	Mazahua	2021–2023 (principally)	≈9	Mexico ≈9	[M-S1]
435	Meänkieli	2021–2023 (principally)	≈9	Sweden ≈9	[M-S1]
436	Palauan	2021–2023 (principally)	≈9	Palau ≈9	[M-S1]
437	Purépecha	2021–2023 (principally)	≈9	Mexico ≈9	[M-S1]
438	Totonac	2021–2023 (principally)	≈9	Mexico ≈9	[M-S1]
439	Ebira	2021–2023 (principally)	≈8	Nigeria ≈8	[M-S1]
440	Ede	2021–2023 (principally)	≈8	Vietnam ≈8	[M-S1]
441	Evenki	2021–2023 (principally)	≈8	Russia ≈8	[M-S1]
442	Hindi, Spanish, French Creole and other languages	2021–2023 (principally)	≈8	Trinidad and Tobago ≈8	[M-S1]
443	Hindko	2021–2023 (principally)	≈8	Pakistan ≈8	[M-S1]
444	Ho	2021–2023 (principally)	≈8	India ≈8	[M-S1]
445	Huave	2021–2023 (principally)	≈8	Mexico ≈8	[M-S1]
446	Jukun languages	2021–2023 (principally)	≈8	Nigeria ≈8	[M-S1]
447	Lemko	2021–2023 (principally)	≈8	Poland ≈8	[M-S1]
448	Mayo	2021–2023 (principally)	≈8	Mexico ≈8	[M-S1]
449	Occitan/Aranese	2021–2023 (principally)	≈8	Spain ≈8	[M-S1]
450	Sentani	2021–2023 (principally)	≈8	Indonesia ≈8	[M-S1]
451	Triqui	2021–2023 (principally)	≈8	Mexico ≈8	[M-S1]
452	Tz’utujil	2021–2023 (principally)	≈8	Guatemala ≈8	[M-S1]
453	Yaqui	2021–2023 (principally)	≈8	Mexico ≈8	[M-S1]
454	Zoroastrian Dari	2021–2023 (principally)	≈8	Iran ≈8	[M-S1]
455	Cora	2021–2023 (principally)	≈7	Mexico ≈7	[M-S1]
456	Guinea-Bissau Creole	2021–2023 (principally)	≈7	Guinea-Bissau ≈7	[M-S1]
457	Hausa and Zarma	2021–2023 (principally)	≈7	Niger ≈7	[M-S1]
458	Indigenous and other languages	2021–2023 (principally)	≈7	Panama ≈7	[M-S1]
459	Other local languages	2021–2023 (principally)	≈7	Somalia ≈7	[M-S1]
460	Popoluca languages	2021–2023 (principally)	≈7	Mexico ≈7	[M-S1]
461	Poqomchi’	2021–2023 (principally)	≈7	Guatemala ≈7	[M-S1]
462	Tepehuan	2021–2023 (principally)	≈7	Mexico ≈7	[M-S1]
463	Achi	2021–2023 (principally)	≈6	Guatemala ≈6	[M-S1]
464	Belizean Kriol	2021–2023 (principally)	≈6	Belize ≈6	[M-S1]
465	Dao	2021–2023 (principally)	≈6	Vietnam ≈6	[M-S1]
466	Dungan	2021–2023 (principally)	≈6	Kyrgyzstan ≈6	[M-S1]
467	Ewe and Kabiyè	2021–2023 (principally)	≈6	Togo ≈6	[M-S1]
468	Gabonese languages (combined)	2021–2023 (principally)	≈6	Gabon ≈6	[M-S1]
469	Kikongo	2021–2023 (principally)	≈6	Democratic Republic of the Congo ≈6	[M-S1]
470	Other Malawian languages	2021–2023 (principally)	≈6	Malawi ≈6	[M-S1]
471	Other Sami languages	2021–2023 (principally)	≈6	Finland ≈6	[M-S1]
472	Pulaar and other languages	2021–2023 (principally)	≈6	Senegal ≈6	[M-S1]
473	Sami languages	2021–2023 (principally)	≈6	Sweden ≈6	[M-S1]
474	Susu	2021–2023 (principally)	≈6	Guinea ≈6	[M-S1]
475	Tshiluba	2021–2023 (principally)	≈6	Democratic Republic of the Congo ≈6	[M-S1]
476	Tuvaluan	2021–2023 (principally)	≈6	Tuvalu ≈6	[M-S1]
477	Abkhaz	2021–2023 (principally)	≈5	Turkey ≈5	[M-S1]
478	Angolan languages (combined)	2021–2023 (principally)	≈5	Angola ≈5	[M-S1]
479	Arawak languages	2021–2023 (principally)	≈5	Bolivia ≈5	[M-S1]
480	Chiquitano	2021–2023 (principally)	≈5	Bolivia ≈5	[M-S1]
481	Chuj	2021–2023 (principally)	≈5	Guatemala ≈5	[M-S1]
482	Creole and other languages	2021–2023 (principally)	≈5	Bahamas ≈4; Saint Vincent and the Grenadines ≈1	[M-S1]
483	Ixil	2021–2023 (principally)	≈5	Guatemala ≈5	[M-S1]
484	Manx	2021–2023 (principally)	≈5	United Kingdom ≈5	[M-S1]
485	Mnong	2021–2023 (principally)	≈5	Vietnam ≈5	[M-S1]
486	Nauruan	2021–2023 (principally)	≈5	Nauru ≈5	[M-S1]
487	Nuristani languages	2021–2023 (principally)	≈5	Afghanistan ≈5	[M-S1]
488	Other Chadian languages	2021–2023 (principally)	≈5	Chad ≈5	[M-S1]
489	Other French overseas Creoles	2021–2023 (principally)	≈5	France ≈5	[M-S1]
490	Other Sierra Leonean languages	2021–2023 (principally)	≈5	Sierra Leone ≈5	[M-S1]
491	Pulaar, Soninke and Wolof	2021–2023 (principally)	≈5	Mauritania ≈5	[M-S1]
492	Rapa Nui	2021–2023 (principally)	≈5	Chile ≈5	[M-S1]
493	Waorani	2021–2023 (principally)	≈5	Ecuador ≈5	[M-S1]
494	Bajan and other languages	2021–2023 (principally)	≈4	Barbados ≈4	[M-S1]
495	Bribri	2021–2023 (principally)	≈4	Costa Rica ≈4	[M-S1]
496	Coho	2021–2023 (principally)	≈4	Vietnam ≈4	[M-S1]
497	Fon	2021–2023 (principally)	≈4	Benin ≈4	[M-S1]
498	Garifuna	2021–2023 (principally)	≈4	Guatemala ≈4	[M-S1]
499	Local languages	2021–2023 (principally)	≈4	Tanzania ≈4	[M-S1]
500	Other minority languages	2021–2023 (principally)	≈4	Vietnam ≈4	[M-S1]
501	Pemón	2021–2023 (principally)	≈4	Venezuela ≈4	[M-S1]
502	Portuguese and other languages	2021–2023 (principally)	≈4	Andorra ≈4	[M-S1]
503	Shina	2021–2023 (principally)	≈4	Pakistan ≈4	[M-S1]
504	Uru-Chipaya	2021–2023 (principally)	≈4	Bolivia ≈4	[M-S1]
505	Võro	2021–2023 (principally)	≈4	Estonia ≈4	[M-S1]
506	Warao	2021–2023 (principally)	≈4	Venezuela ≈4	[M-S1]
507	Zambian languages (combined)	2021–2023 (principally)	≈4	Zambia ≈4	[M-S1]
508	Aromanian	2021–2023 (principally)	≈3	North Macedonia ≈3	[M-S1]
509	Awakatek	2021–2023 (principally)	≈3	Guatemala ≈3	[M-S1]
510	Balti	2021–2023 (principally)	≈3	Pakistan ≈3	[M-S1]
511	Bru-Van Kieu	2021–2023 (principally)	≈3	Vietnam ≈3	[M-S1]
512	Burushaski	2021–2023 (principally)	≈3	Pakistan ≈3	[M-S1]
513	Cabécar	2021–2023 (principally)	≈3	Costa Rica ≈3	[M-S1]
514	Mojeño	2021–2023 (principally)	≈3	Bolivia ≈3	[M-S1]
515	Pashayi	2021–2023 (principally)	≈3	Afghanistan ≈3	[M-S1]
516	Tacana	2021–2023 (principally)	≈3	Bolivia ≈3	[M-S1]
517	Bari and other local languages	2021–2023 (principally)	≈2	South Sudan ≈2	[M-S1]
518	Cook Islands Māori	2021–2023 (principally)	≈2	New Zealand ≈2	[M-S1]
519	Dendi	2021–2023 (principally)	≈2	Benin ≈2	[M-S1]
520	Garifuna, Maya and other languages	2021–2023 (principally)	≈2	Belize ≈2	[M-S1]
521	Niuean	2021–2023 (principally)	≈2	New Zealand ≈2	[M-S1]
522	Other Afghan languages	2021–2023 (principally)	≈2	Afghanistan ≈2	[M-S1]
523	Xinka	2021–2023 (principally)	≈2	Guatemala ≈2	[M-S1]
524	Yom and Baatonu	2021–2023 (principally)	≈2	Benin ≈2	[M-S1]
525	Fang and other languages	2021–2023 (principally)	≈1	Equatorial Guinea ≈1	[M-S1]
526	Forro and other languages	2021–2023 (principally)	≈1	São Tomé and Príncipe ≈1	[M-S1]
527	French Creole and other languages	2021–2023 (principally)	≈1	Grenada ≈1	[M-S1]
528	Tigre and other languages	2021–2023 (principally)	≈1	Eritrea ≈1	[M-S1]
529	Tokelauan	2021–2023 (principally)	≈1	New Zealand ≈1	[M-S1]
Estimated world total			≈2,825,925	Arithmetic sum of all 529 language rows	[M-S1]

== See also ==
- Books published per country per year
