= Books published per country per year =

This page lists the number of book titles published per country per year from various sources. According to UNESCO, this is an important index of standard of living, education, and of a country's self-awareness. No standardised way to track the number of books published exists which can make it difficult to compare countries or track the industry as a whole. One method is to track how many International Standard Book Numbers (ISBNs) are registered by each country.

== List of countries ==
In descending order of number of new titles per year, as of the latest year available, sometimes "new titles and editions"

Rank	Country	Year	Titles	Notes	References
1	China	2015	470,000	New titles and re-editions	
2	United States	2015	338,986	New titles and re-editions	
3	United Kingdom	2018	188,000	New titles and re-editions	
4	Japan	2017	139,078	New titles and re-editions	
5	Indonesia	2020	135,081		
6	Russia	2019	115,171		
7	France	2018	106,799		
8	Iran	2018	102,691	New titles and re-editions	
9	India	2013	90,000	Total; revised editions not included; 26% in Hindi, 24% in English, and the rest in other Indian languages	
10	Spain	2017	89,962	New titles and re-editions (ediciones y reimpresiones)	
11	Turkey	2019	75,667	New titles and re-editions ("Derlenen Kitap Sayısı")	
12	Italy	2015	65,886	New titles and re-editions	
13	Germany	2024	65,717	Including 58,346 first editions	
14	South Korea	2018	63,476	New	
15	Brazil	2018	46,829		
16	Argentina	2025	36,942	New	
17	Australia	2014	28,234		
18	Taiwan	2010	28,084	43,258 total	
19	Vietnam	2009	24,589		
20	Ukraine	2019	24,416		
21	Netherlands	2015	23,658	New titles and re-editions	
22	Poland	2015	21,130	34,920 total	
23	Sweden	2025	19,260	Including 11,518 non-fiction books and 7,742 fiction books	
24	Czech Republic	2019	17,330		
25	Colombia	2017	17,066	18,508 total	
26	Malaysia	2015	15,354	Declined since 2013 at 19,987	
27	Romania	2008	14,984		
28	Canada	2018	14,625		
29	Hong Kong	2005	14,603		
30	Egypt	2021	13,255		
31	Denmark	2024	12,979		
32	Switzerland	2015	12,208	New titles and re-editions	
33	Singapore	2007	12,000+		
34	Serbia	2019	11,897		
35	Hungary	2012	11,645		
36	Bulgaria	2017	10,068		
37	Philippines	2015	9,480	New titles and re-editions	
38	Slovakia	2006	9,400		
39	Israel	2013	8,411		
40	Finland	2024	8,350		
41	Belarus	2020	8,205		
42	Austria	1996	8,056		
43	Portugal	1996	7,868		
44	Norway	2025	7,623		
45	Mexico	2012	7,521	23,948 total	
46	Greece	2002	6,826		
47	Thailand	2018	6,750	Only trade sector data; educational sector data not available	
48	Chile	2012	5,641	6,045 total	
49	South Africa	1995	5,418		
50	Estonia	2025	5,197	Including 3,296 printed books and 1,901 e-books	
51	Belgium	2015	5,130	New titles and re-editions	
52	Georgia	2015	4,173	New titles and re-editions	
53	Sri Lanka	1996	4,115		
54	Peru	2006	4,101		
55	Algeria	2008	3,955		
56	Pakistan	2012	3,811	Total; 2,943 in Urdu and 868 in English	
57	Lebanon	2005	3,686		
58	Morocco	2018/2019	3,677		
59	Myanmar	1993	3,660		
60	New Zealand	2003	3,600		
61	Slovenia	1996	3,406		
62	Uruguay	2018	3,231		
63	Lithuania	2025	3,135		
64	Ecuador	2010	2,854	4,164 total	
65	Afghanistan	1990	2,795		
66	Bosnia and Herzegovina	2015	2,791	New titles and re-editions	
67	Moldova	2024	2,457		
68	Saudi Arabia	2015	2,387	New titles and re-editions	
69	Venezuela	2018	2,275		
70	Latvia	2025	2,196		
71	Costa Rica	2018	2,158		
72	Luxembourg	2001	2,000		
73	Dominican Republic	2018	1,866		
74	Iceland	2019	1,767		
75	Bolivia	2018	1,578		
76	Kyrgyzstan	2018	1,455		
77	Nigeria	1991	1,314		
78	Kazakhstan	1996	1,226		
79	Syria	2004	1,138		
80	Guatemala	2018	1,042		
81	Uzbekistan	1996	1,003		
82	Paraguay	2018	1,007		
83	Cuba	2018	992		
84	Eritrea	2015	970		
85	Panama	2018	940		
86	Cyprus	1996	930		
87	North Macedonia	2025	813		
88	Tunisia	1996	720		
89	El Salvador	2018	661		
90	Azerbaijan	1996	542		
91	Jordan	1996	511		
92	Kenya	2015	491	New titles and re-editions	
93	Turkmenistan	1994	450		
94	Malta	1995	404		
95	Fiji	1994	401		
96	Armenia	1996	396		
97	Albania	1991	390		
98	United Arab Emirates	1993	293		
99	Uganda	1996	288		
100	Mongolia	1992	285		
101	Ethiopia	1991	240		
102	Zimbabwe	1992	232		
103	Vatican City	1996	228		
104	Qatar	1996	209		
105	Kuwait	1992	196		
106	Tanzania	1990	172		
107	Botswana	1991	158		
108	Tajikistan	1996	132		
109	Papua New Guinea	1991	122		
110	Madagascar	1996	119		
111	Malawi	1996	117		
112	Palestine	1996	114		
113	Namibia	1990	106		
114	Honduras	2018	102		
115	Brunei	2009	91		
116	Laos	1995	88		
117	Benin	1994	84		
118	Mauritius	1996	80		
119	Réunion	1992	69		
120	Democratic Republic of the Congo	1992	64		
121	Andorra	1994	57		
122	Suriname	1996	47		
123	American Samoa	1980	46		
124	Guyana	1996	42		
125	Monaco	1990	41		
126	Bahrain	1996	40		
127	Ghana	1992	28		
128	Nicaragua	2018	27		
129	Libya	1994	26		
130	Angola	1995	22		
131	Mali	1995	14		
132	Gambia	1996	14		
133	Burkina Faso	1996	12		
134	Oman	1996	7		

Total: approximately 2,660,000

== Countries by ISBN ==
Many published books have an ISBN and it is a useful measure for how productive a country's publishing industry is. However, this data is not collected for all countries. It may not represent the total number of books a country has published, as not every registered ISBN is then used and as books may have multiple ISBNs.

Number of ISBNs registered per country
Rank	Country	2022	2021	2020	2018
1	United States	3,279,217	2,884,609	3,931,270	3,485,322
2	Japan	902,311	184,985	114,272	95,129
3	South Korea	338,237	340,506	329,582	
4	India	281,091			129,326
5	Germany	277,000	284,000	284,000	
6	China			263,066	
7	Brazil	179,042	114,114		95,336
8	United Kingdom	153,167	168,960	188,553	185,721
9	Italy	139,970	142,267	135,133	137,397
10	Indonesia	107,856	159,330	144,793	
11	Russia			124,454	103,826
12	Poland		99,995		
13	Spain	95,811	95,985	80,704	86,872
14	Iran		89,888	90,000	
15	Turkey	83,653	87,231	78,500	67,135
16	Canada				61,000
17	Netherlands	59,283	62,251	40,105	6,143
18	Denmark		39,183	39,479	
19	Sweden	37,338	34,984	34,016	
20	Argentina	35,500	34,256	27,694	27,428
21	Czechia	34,985	26,597	26,367	
22	Australia	31,708	33,464	32,114	
23	Mexico	27,534	23,304	20,925	27,635
24	Singapore	25,980			
25	Estonia	25,391	13,342	11,221	
26	Greece	22,622			
27	Portugal	21,115	21,379		
28	Colombia	20,840	20,347	18,925	20,867
29	Hungary	20,339			
30	Thailand	19,362	18,225	17,952	20,484
31	Slovakia	14,603	12,065	12,586	
32	Nigeria	14,392	18,300	13,900	2,465
33	Bulgaria	12,738	13,085	11,698	
34	Bangladesh	10,298			
35	Philippines	9,889	9,497	6,510	
36	Ukraine	9,691	25,722	23,640	
37	Slovenia	9,656			
38	Switzerland	9,490			
39	Norway	9,033	9,324	8,599	9,209
40	Peru	8,310	7,885	5,698	
41	Chile	8,288	8,528	8,353	
42	Croatia	7,179	7,260	6,785	
43	Sri Lanka	6,705			
44	Ecuador	5,128	4,477	4,264	4,744
45	Jordan	4,785			
46	Lithuania	4,748	5,187	4,810	
47	Mongolia	3,794	3,916	3,331	
48	Latvia	3,411	3,541	3,391	
49	Albania	3,174			
50	Tunisia	3,143			
51	Venezuela	2,855	3,050	2,186	
52	Uruguay	2,786	2,697	2,220	
53	Syria	2,540	1,900	1,600	
54	Cyprus	2,193			
55	Bosnia and Herzegovina	2,163			
56	Ghana	2,000	2,200	2,500	
57	Costa Rica	1,959	2,007	1,724	
58	Cuba	1,944	2,361	2,950	
59	Dominican Republic	1,937	1,853	1,765	
60	Bolivia	1,718	1,544	1,103	
61	Iceland	1,470			
62	Panama	1,319	1,596	884	
63	Guatemala	1,291	1,258	1,073	1,137
64	Malta	1,229	1,032	1,134	
65	Paraguay	1,030	1,112	823	
66	Kenya	854			
67	El Salvador	719	661	675	
68	Malawi	395	311	412	
69	Honduras				388

== See also ==
Books published per language per annum
