= List of international rankings =

This is a list of international rankings by country.

== By category ==
=== Agriculture ===
- Production
  - Apple
  - Apricot
  - Artichoke
  - Avocado
  - Barley
  - Cereal
  - Cherry
  - Coconut
  - Coffee
  - Corn
  - Cucumber
  - Eggplant
  - Fruit
  - Garlic
  - Grape
  - Papaya
  - Pear
  - Pineapple
  - Plum
  - Potato
  - Rice
  - Soybean
  - Tomato
  - Vegetables
  - Wheat
  - Wine
- Forest area
- Irrigated land area

=== Consumption ===
- Meat
- Seafood
- Milk
- Beer
- Electricity
- Oil
- Natural gas
- Cannabis
- Cocaine
- Opiates

=== Culture ===
- List of countries by number of Academy Awards for Best International Feature Film
- List of World Heritage Sites by country
- Books published per country per year
- Power distance

=== Economy ===
- World Economic Forum: Global Competitiveness Report
- World Economic Forum: Financial Development Index
- International Institute for Management Development: World Competitiveness Yearbook
- Gini index: List of countries by income equality
- Bloomberg Innovation Index
- Global Innovation Index
- International Innovation Index
- Index of Economic Freedom
- Ease of doing business index
- Indigo Index
- Transparency International: Corruption Perceptions Index

==== Lists ====
- List of countries by economic complexity
- List of countries by external debt
- List of countries by long-term unemployment rate
- List of countries by net international investment position per capita
- List of countries by average wage
- List of minimum wages by country
- List of countries by public debt
- List of countries by wealth per adult
- List of countries by credit rating
- List of countries by government budget
- Gross national income
  - List of countries by GNI (PPP) per capita
  - List of countries by GNI (nominal, Atlas method) per capita
  - Lists of countries by GDP
  - List of countries by GDP sector composition
  - List of countries by GDP (nominal)
  - List of countries by GDP (nominal) per capita
  - List of countries by GDP (PPP) per capita
  - List of countries by GDP (PPP)
  - List of countries by real GDP growth rate
  - List of countries by tax revenue to GDP ratio
  - List of countries by largest historical GDP

=== Education and innovation ===
- List of countries by spending on education (% of GDP)
- List of countries by 25- to 34-year-olds having a tertiary education degree
- Global Social Mobility Index
- Education Index
- Trends in International Mathematics and Science Study
- Programme for International Student Assessment
- Progress in International Reading Literacy Study
- List of countries by literacy rate
- World Intellectual Property Indicators
- List of countries by tertiary education attainment
- List of countries by secondary education attainment
- EF English Proficiency Index
- Programming Ability Index
- Organisation for Economic Co-operation and Development: The OECD Programme for International Student Assessment (PISA)
- International Association for the Evaluation of Educational Achievement: Trends in International Mathematics and Science Study
- Educational Testing Service: 2003-2004 TOEFL Test Year Data Summary
- Webometrics Ranking of World Universities
- List of Nobel laureates by country
- QS World University Rankings

=== Environment ===
- List of countries by air pollution
- List of countries by natural disaster risk
- Climate Change Performance Index (CCPI)
- Environmental Performance Index (EPI)
- Environmental Sustainability Index (ESI)
- Environmental Vulnerability Index (EVI)
- Happy Planet Index (HPI)
- List of countries by ecological footprint
- Sustainable Society Index (SSI)
- The Global 100 (G100)
- List of countries by freshwater withdrawal
- List of countries by carbon dioxide emissions per capita
- List of countries by carbon dioxide emissions

=== Exports ===
- List of countries by net exports
- List of countries by exports per capita
- List of countries by aluminium exports
- List of countries by merchandise exports
- List of countries by service exports and imports
- List of countries by natural gas exports
- List of countries by net oil exports
- List of countries by oil exports
- List of countries by refined petroleum exports
- List of countries by gold exports
- List of countries by copper exports
- List of countries by iron-ore exports
- List of countries by diamond exports
- List of countries by electricity exports
- List of countries by truck exports
- List of countries by ship exports
- List of countries by automotive component exports
- List of countries by aircraft component exports
- List of countries by aircraft and spacecraft exports
- List of countries by engine exports
- List of countries by gas turbine exports
- List of countries by computer exports
- List of countries by integrated circuit exports
- List of countries by telephone exports
- List of countries by telecommunications equipment exports
- List of countries by pharmaceutical exports
- List of countries by maize exports
- List of countries by wheat exports
- List of countries by coffee exports
- List of countries by cotton exports

=== General ===
- Good Country Index
- Linguistic diversity index
- Soft power
- Henley Passport Index

=== Geography ===
- List of political and geographic subdivisions by total area (all)
- List of countries and dependencies by area

=== Health ===
- List of countries by health insurance coverage
- List of countries by health expenditure covered by government
- List of countries by hospital beds
- List of countries by cancer rate
- List of countries by risk of death from non-communicable disease
- Euro health consumer index (EHCI)
- Global Hunger Index (GHI)
- List of countries by life expectancy
- List of countries by infant mortality rate
- List of average human height worldwide
- List of countries by body mass index
- List of countries by obesity rate
- List of countries by HIV/AIDS adult prevalence rate
- Prevalence of tobacco consumption
- List of countries by cigarette consumption per capita
- List of countries by alcohol consumption per capita
- List of countries by suicide rate
- List of the oldest people by country

=== Industry ===
- List of countries by electricity production
- List of countries by electricity production from renewable sources
- List of countries by uranium production
- List of countries by platinum production
- List of countries by gold production
- List of countries by silver production
- List of countries by nickel production
- List of countries by copper production
- List of countries by steel production
- List of countries by aluminium production
- List of countries by aluminium oxide production
- List of countries by bismuth production
- List of countries by mercury production
- List of countries by bentonite production
- List of countries by feldspar production
- List of countries by lithium production
- List of countries by palladium production
- List of countries by iridium production
- List of countries by manganese production
- List of countries by magnesium production
- List of countries by tin production
- List of countries by zinc production
- List of countries by salt production
- List of countries by silicon production
- Lists of countries by mineral production
- List of countries by oil production
- List of countries by natural gas production
- List of countries by coal production
- List of countries by bauxite production
- List of countries by cement production

=== Military ===
- List of aircraft carriers by country
- List of countries by firearms holding
- List of countries by military expenditures
- List of countries by military expenditures per capita
- List of countries by number of military and paramilitary personnel
- Composite Index of National Capability

=== Politics ===
- UN e-Government
- Transparency International: Global Corruption Barometer and Corruption Perceptions Index
- V-Dem Democracy indices
- Democracy Index (The Economist)
- Freedom House: Freedom in the World
- Reporters Without Borders: Worldwide Press Freedom Index
- List of countries by consultation on rule-making
- Global Terrorism Index
- Worldwide Governance Indicators
- Fragile States Index
- World Justice Project Rule of Law Index
- Presidentialism index
- Citizen-initiated component of direct popular vote index
- Polity data series
- Democracy-Dictatorship Index
- Gallagher index
- Effective number of parties
- Democracy Ranking

=== Reserves ===
- Coal
- Natural gas
- Oil
- Thorium
- Uranium
- Foreign-exchange reserves
- Foreign-exchange reserves (excluding gold)

=== Society ===
- List of countries and dependencies by population
- List of countries and dependencies by population density
- List of countries by guaranteed minimum income
- List of countries by gun ownership
- List of countries by homeless population
- List of countries by incarceration rate
- List of countries by intentional homicide rate
- List of countries by public spending in tertiary education
- List of countries ranked by ethnic and cultural diversity level
- Dashboard of Sustainability (includes a ranking by Millennium Development Goals)
- Economist Intelligence Unit: Where-to-be-born Index
- Gender Development Index
- Gender Empowerment Measure
- Gender Inequality Index
- Global Gender Gap Report
- Global Organized Crime Index
- Global Retirement Index
- Legatum Prosperity Index
- Save the Children: State of the World's Mothers report
- Social Progress Index
- Urbanization by country
- United Nations Development Programme: Human Development Index
- Walk Free Foundation: Global Slavery Index
- World Giving Index
- World Happiness Report

=== Sport ===
- Archery
- Athletics
- Badminton (junior)
- Beach soccer
- Baseball & softball
- Basketball (men, women)
- Boxing
- Chess
- Cricket (Test, ODI, T20I)
- Curling
- Cycling (road)
- Darts (PDC)
- Figure skating (World Standings, Season's World Ranking)
- Floorball
- Football (men, women)
- Golf (men, women, amateur)
- Field hockey
- Ice hockey
- Korfball
- Muay Thai
- Netball
- Olympic Medals
- Paralympic Medals
- Roller hockey
- Rugby league (men, women, wheelchair)
- Rugby union
- Snooker
- Squash (men, women)
- Table tennis
- Tennis (men, women, team)
- Volleyball (beach)
- Water Polo

=== Technology ===
- UN International Telecommunication Union: ICT Development Index
- List of countries by Internet connection speeds
- List of countries by 4G LTE penetration
- List of countries by mobile banking usage
- Google: List of countries by smartphone penetration
- List of countries by stem cell research trials
- OECD: List of countries by number of broadband Internet subscriptions
- List of countries by number of Internet hosts
- Space Competitiveness Index (SCI)
- World Wide Web Foundation: Web Index

=== Transport ===
- Logistics Performance Index
- List of countries by rail usage
- List of countries by rail transport network size
- List of countries by traffic-related death rate
- List of countries by vehicles per capita
- List of countries by waterways length

== See also ==
- Index number
- List of globalization-related indices
- List of freedom indices
- List of democracy indices
