= List of countries by rice production =

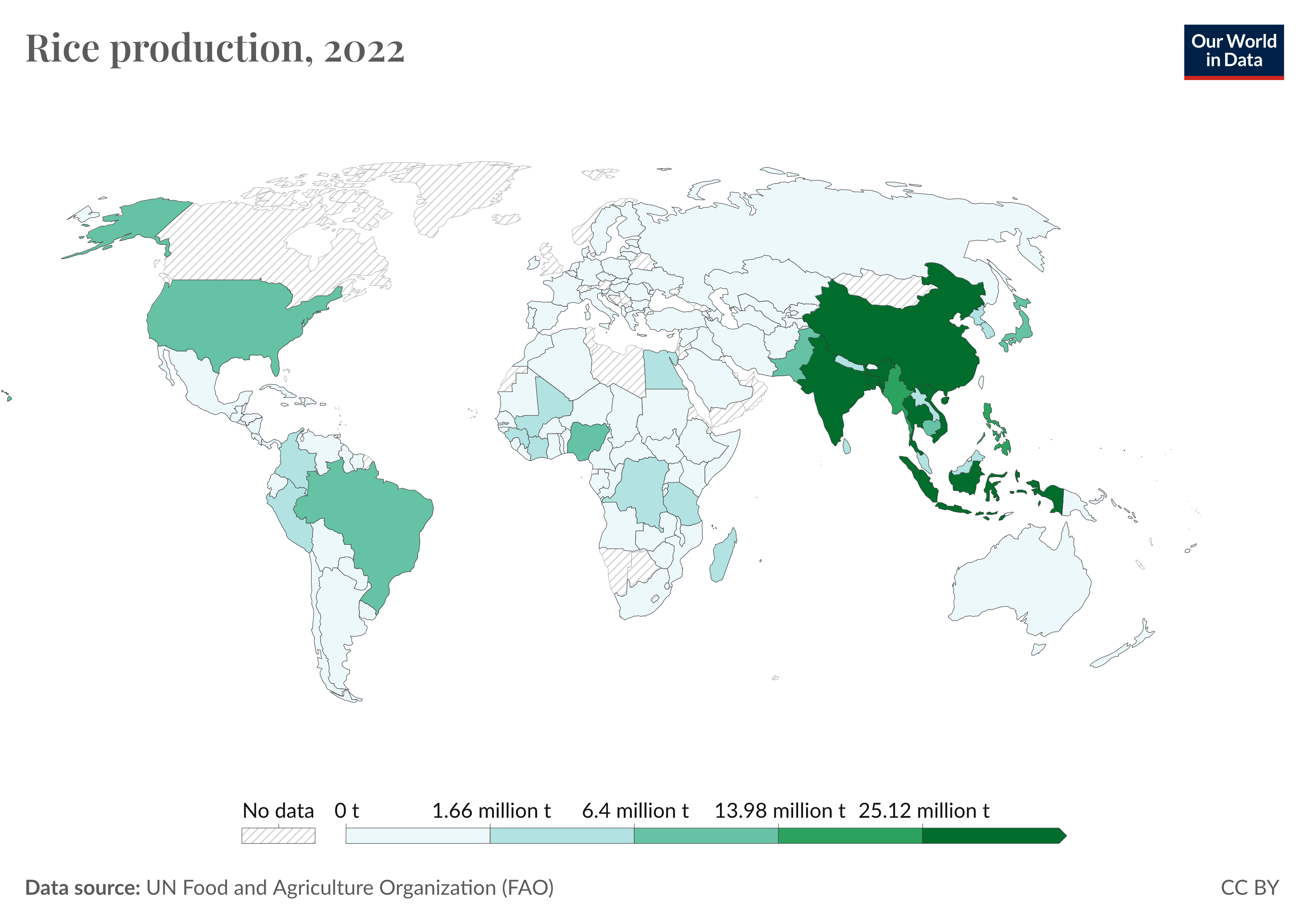
Global map of countries by rice production in 2022

Rice production by country (2019)

This is a list of countries by rice production in 2022 based on the Food and Agriculture Organization Corporate Statistical Database. The total world rice production for 2022 was 776,461,457 metric tonnes. In 1961, the total world production was 216 million tonnes.

== Production by country ==
The table shows the countries with the largest production of rice in 2022 (paddy rice).

Rank	Country/region	Rice production (tonnes)
>1,000,000 tonnes
1	India	265,098,885
2	China	255,245,235
3	Bangladesh	57,189,193
4	Indonesia	54,748,977
5	Vietnam	42,672,339
6	Thailand	34,317,028
7	Myanmar	24,680,200
8	Philippines	19,756,392
9	Cambodia	11,624,000
10	Pakistan	10,983,081
11	Brazil	10,776,268
12	Japan	10,363,900
13	Nigeria	8,502,000
14	United States	7,274,170
15	Egypt	5,800,000
16	Nepal	5,486,500
17	South Korea	4,998,223
18	Madagascar	4,585,000
19	Laos	3,594,800
20	Peru	3,449,365
21	Sri Lanka	3,392,905
22	Mali	2,864,723
23	Tanzania	2,856,500
24	Colombia	2,620,100
25	Guinea	2,523,305
26	Malaysia	2,364,453
27	North Korea	2,061,443
28	Ivory Coast	1,993,000
29	DR Congo	1,692,323
30	Taiwan	1,576,000
31	Iran	1,500,000
32	Senegal	1,409,120
33	Sierra Leone	1,397,000
34	Uruguay	1,372,700
35	Ghana	1,283,000
36	Ecuador	1,252,800
37	Italy	1,236,960
38	Argentina	1,222,426
39	Dominican Republic	1,149,000
100,000–1,000,000 tonnes
40	Turkey	950,000
41	Guyana	929,600
42	Russia	920,095
43	Paraguay	861,500
44	Uganda	730,000
45	Australia	691,444
46	Bolivia	608,681
47	Afghanistan	592,000
48	Benin	525,014
49	Nicaragua	504,391
50	Venezuela	478,473
51	Burkina Faso	438,982
52	Kazakhstan	431,391
53	Mauritania	403,000
54	Panama	390,000
55	Mozambique	365,000
56	Uzbekistan	359,147
57	Spain	350,420
58	Cameroon	343,103
59	Liberia	288,000
60	Suriname	266,204
61	Mexico	246,989
62	Chad	231,965
63	Guinea-Bissau	224,000
64	Greece	214,750
65	Ethiopia	208,000
66	Kenya	192,299
67	Cuba	183,932
68	Togo	169,608
69	Portugal	155,570
70	Malawi	147,000
71	Niger	144,000
72	Haiti	140,000
73	Rwanda	135,075
74	Burundi	127,484
75	Tajikistan	110,399
76	Costa Rica	103,740
77	Chile	100,557
10,000–100,000 tonnes
78	Turkmenistan	86,285
79	Timor-Leste	76,000
80	France	64,480
81	Bulgaria	64,320
82	Zambia	62,280
83	Central African Republic	51,773
84	Honduras	51,129
85	Morocco	49,110
86	Gambia	44,597
87	Kyrgyzstan	44,248
88	Bhutan	41,049
89	South Sudan	36,515
90	Sudan	33,000
91	Guatemala	32,000
92	El Salvador	23,000
93	North Macedonia	18,981
94	Romania	16,900
95	Belize	15,364
96	Fiji	12,991
97	Iraq	11,637
98	Azerbaijan	10,715
99	Angola	10,563
100	Hungary	10,150
1,000–10,000 tonnes
101	Brunei	4,200
102	Ukraine	3,090
103	South Africa	3,082
104	Solomon Islands	2,754
105	Zimbabwe	1,923
106	Gabon	1,730
107	Somalia	1,588
108	Republic of the Congo	1,000
109	Eswatini	1,000
<1,000 tonnes
110	Papua New Guinea	887
111	Saudi Arabia	815
112	Algeria	307
113	Puerto Rico	179
114	Federated States of Micronesia	178
115	Trinidad and Tobago	125
116	Comoros	5
117	Hong Kong	0.06

== Historical statistics ==
=== World production ===
World production in tonnes

Year	Production
1961	215,646,627
1962	226,456,291
1963	247,119,204
1964	262,928,949
1965	254,059,657
1966	261,181,246
1967	277,386,339
1968	288,624,275
1969	295,584,346
1970	316,345,651

Year	Production
1971	317,712,363
1972	307,289,867
1973	334,928,765
1974	331,970,539
1975	356,963,012
1976	347,686,382
1977	369,481,070
1978	385,208,660
1979	375,251,671
1980	396,871,220

Year	Production
1981	410,075,138
1982	421,948,954
1983	448,016,205
1984	465,342,803
1985	468,164,482
1986	468,675,152
1987	461,439,818
1988	487,457,812
1989	514,421,550
1990	518,568,551

Year	Production
1991	518,512,573
1992	527,878,059
1993	529,599,553
1994	538,591,043
1995	547,162,009
1996	568,658,020
1997	577,136,882
1998	578,813,971
1999	611,177,562
2000	598,668,144

Year	Production
2001	600,246,670
2002	571,051,377
2003	586,931,574
2004	607,349,029
2005	634,225,538
2006	640,705,586
2007	653,970,131
2008	684,382,979
2009	680,265,683
2010	694,471,884

Year	Production
2011	719,469,859
2012	727,680,662
2013	731,770,431
2014	730,801,993
2015	731,952,333
2016	734,073,708
2017	747,410,272
2018	759,066,702
2019	749,189,908
2020	756,743,722

Year	Production
2021	787,293,867
2022	776,461,457

=== Large producers ===
Rice production in million tonnes
Country	2020	2010	2000	1990	1980	1970	1961
China	211.9	195.8	187.9	189.3	139.9	110.0	53.6
India	178.3	144.0	127.5	111.2	80.3	63.3	53.4
Bangladesh	54.9	50.1	37.6	26.8	20.8	16.7	14.4
Indonesia	54.6	59.3	51.9	45.2	29.7	19.3	12.1
Vietnam	42.8	40.0	32.5	19.2	11.6	10.2	9.0
Thailand	30.2	35.7	25.8	17.2	17.4	13.9	10.2
Myanmar	25.1	32.1	21.0	14.0	13.3	8.2	6.8
Philippines	19.3	15.8	12.4	9.9	7.6	5.6	3.9
Brazil	11.1	11.2	11.1	7.4	9.8	7.6	5.4
United States	10.3	11.0	8.7	7.1	6.6	3.8	2.5
Japan	9.7	10.7	11.9	13.1	12.2	16.5	16.2
Pakistan	8.4	7.2	7.2	4.9	4.7	3.3	1.7
Nigeria	8.2	4.5	3.3	2.5	1.1	0.3	1.3
