= List of countries by aluminium exports =

The following is a list of countries by raw aluminium exports.

== International Trade Centre ==
Data is for 2024, in thousands of United States dollars and tons.

List of countries by raw aluminium exports
Country	Value exported (thousands USD)	Trade balance (thousands USD)	Quantity exported (tons)
World	11,019,281	−1,183,621	185,183,212
Guinea	8,332,088	8,332,050	122,893,224
Australia	1,652,908	1,651,629	43,013,185
Brazil	231,084	228,019	5,435,753
Turkey	170,714	146,485	4,316,098
Ghana	120,484	120,484	1,431,597
Guyana	113,075	113,075	1,060,390
Laos	105,832	105,832	1,552,320
Jamaica	53,731	53,710	2,093,409
Malaysia	40,702	35,300	614,878
Montenegro	30,372	30,372	642,099
Netherlands	29,101	−10,913	55,643
Sierra Leone	24,476	24,476	455,575
Côte d'Ivoire	21,735	21,735	725,634
Germany	17,657	−121,902	32,173
India	10,298	−342,939	347,728
Greece	9,859	−60,900	131,197
Spain	9,704	−107,903	18,174
United States	8,213	−165,572	14,691
Belgium	7,226	−1,810	14,111
China	5,897	−10,545,008	23,886
Croatia	4,142	−6,442	33,905
Bosnia and Herzegovina	3,732	−3,898	56,040
Canada	3,510	−131,721	127,211
United Kingdom	2,901	−6,269	3,982
Hungary	2,178	2,090	26,737
France	1,435	−37,135	4,876
Pakistan	1,353	1,348	29,077
Italy	1,180	−13,084	3,696
Mozambique	563	563	4,569
Taiwan	559	−9,117	1,261
Qatar	331	281	743
Poland	311	−20,254	461
Latvia	264	−2,438	1,514
Estonia	249	249	119
Kenya	202	−156	9,990
Denmark	195	−463	26
Tanzania	190	190	3,840
Kazakhstan	175	−1,093	565
Romania	124	−2,034	1,038
Switzerland	120	−2,505	751
South Africa	109	−4,072	373
Lithuania	56	−199	24
Czech Republic	52	−3,054	151
Slovenia	51	−8,153	279
Bulgaria	28	−76	16
Ireland	24	−273,778	0
South Korea	22	−36,860	60
Iran	22	−25	91
Singapore	21	6	40
Austria	16	−8,998	7
Norway	6	4	1
Slovakia	2	−2,706	2
Nigeria	1	1	0
Thailand	1	−9,701	0

== Observatory of Economic Complexity ==
Data is for 2023, in United States dollars.

List of countries by raw aluminium exports
Country	Trade value
Canada	8,093,249,507
Russia	6,821,706,536
United Arab Emirates	6,651,276,457
India	6,029,521,045
Malaysia	4,386,612,108
Norway	4,084,700,803
Australia	3,837,078,803
Netherlands	3,552,383,609
Bahrain	3,376,108,809
Iceland	2,418,292,840
South Africa	1,708,236,011
United States	1,647,596,231
Qatar	1,507,175,122
Italy	1,477,330,696
Germany	1,445,564,611
Mozambique	1,405,906,544
China	955,079,863
Saudi Arabia	806,033,530
New Zealand	805,559,749
Brazil	797,432,771
Kazakhstan	784,349,853
Spain	756,205,150
France	747,459,519
Oman	678,533,708
Vietnam	666,053,096
Argentina	657,419,193
United Kingdom	652,571,137
Austria	541,779,059
Iran	530,977,565
Poland	528,115,304
Sweden	487,541,301
South Korea	469,418,657
Indonesia	448,349,127
Denmark	383,281,345
Romania	376,402,590
Turkey	362,768,067
Egypt	359,419,145
Greece	357,654,098
Slovenia	316,514,767
Singapore	315,094,093
Thailand	292,600,137
Luxembourg	282,945,169
Nigeria	249,286,811
Chinese Taipei	246,447,951
Czech Republic	237,310,229
Venezuela	229,534,265
Switzerland	202,590,328
Hungary	190,799,598
Montenegro	183,387,126
Bahamas	171,774,027
Belgium	167,148,947
Japan	163,994,648
Mexico	139,255,793
Slovakia	111,994,183
Ghana	107,711,546
Bosnia and Herzegovina	103,229,515
Tajikistan	101,846,484
Azerbaijan	90,296,385
Cameroon	84,371,153
Pakistan	75,116,073
Ukraine	70,653,549
Finland	56,675,674
Albania	48,821,286
Bulgaria	46,512,032
Hong Kong	36,182,958
Cambodia	33,984,902
Angola	31,676,297
Myanmar	28,987,676
Philippines	28,610,058
Portugal	28,545,057
Morocco	25,992,113
Latvia	20,251,794
Serbia	18,511,774
Bangladesh	16,461,878
Armenia	14,026,046
Ireland	13,884,727
Uzbekistan	12,640,588
Tanzania	12,066,274
Mongolia	10,804,194
Zambia	10,481,118
Iraq	9,924,075
Jordan	9,797,114
Estonia	9,531,155
Senegal	9,153,258
Guinea	9,001,579
Lebanon	8,298,159
Georgia	7,922,705
Lithuania	7,785,259
Croatia	7,700,633
Tunisia	7,261,787
Togo	5,991,838
Colombia	5,254,208
Gabon	4,987,869
Libya	4,591,706
Kyrgyzstan	4,530,636
Sudan	2,925,873
Dominican Republic	2,456,671
Syria	2,318,464
Israel	1,822,131
Papua New Guinea	1,718,283
Laos	1,687,682
Chile	1,421,130
Cyprus	1,296,335
Republic of the Congo	1,277,745
Ecuador	1,206,246
Barbados	962,152
Benin	956,498
Malawi	843,458
Belarus	825,294
Mauritius	808,642
Sri Lanka	762,509
DR Congo	687,498
Rwanda	635,269
Kenya	635,070
New Caledonia	611,854
North Korea	515,631
Kuwait	489,388
San Marino	489,156
Panama	489,055
Algeria	468,199
Paraguay	464,673
Solomon Islands	412,550
Cuba	369,201
Zimbabwe	369,167
Cote d'Ivoire	364,232
Peru	295,314
Mali	286,637
Yemen	196,973
Guam	171,532
Curacao	167,171
Ethiopia	157,495
El Salvador	154,848
Guatemala	151,843
Malta	146,727
North Macedonia	136,836
Timor-Leste	129,581
Brunei	115,233
Turkmenistan	114,108
Uganda	81,274
Guyana	78,622
Costa Rica	73,728
Jamaica	71,593
Haiti	64,512
Uruguay	59,466
Botswana	52,614
Palestine	42,018
Norfolk Island	29,977
Trinidad and Tobago	19,030
Namibia	4,721
Burkina Faso	2,609
Sierra Leone	646
Eswatini	291
Honduras	45
Gambia	0
