= List of countries by corn production =

The following are international Maize (corn) production statistics come from the Food and Agriculture Organization figures from FAOSTAT statics

The quantities of corn (maize, Zea mays) in the following table are in million metric tonnes (m STs, m LTs). All countries with a typical production quantity of at least 10 million t (11 million short tons; 9.8 million long tons) are listed below.

Country	2022	2021	2020	2019	2018
World	1,163.5 (1,282.5; 1,145.1)	1,208.0 (1,331.6; 1,188.9)	1,155.8 (1,274.1; 1,137.5)	1,137.7 (1,254.1; 1,119.7)	1,124.3 (1,239.3; 1,106.5)
United States	348.8 (384.5; 343.3)	382.9 (422.1; 376.9)	358.4 (395.1; 352.7)	346.0 (381.4; 340.5)	364.3 (401.6; 358.5)
China	277.2 (305.6; 272.8)	272.6 (300.5; 268.3)	260.7 (287.4; 256.6)	260.8 (287.5; 256.7)	257.2 (283.5; 253.1)
Brazil	109.4 (120.6; 107.7)	88.3 (97.3; 86.9)	104.0 (114.6; 102.4)	101.1 (111.4; 99.5)	82.4 (90.8; 81.1)
Argentina	59.0 (65.0; 58.1)	60.5 (66.7; 59.5)	58.4 (64.4; 57.5)	56.9 (62.7; 56.0)	43.5 (48.0; 42.8)
European Union	53.0 (58.4; 52.2)	73.0 (80.5; 71.8)	67.3 (74.2; 66.2)	70.1 (77.3; 69.0)	69.0 (76.1; 67.9)
India	33.7 (37.1; 33.2)	31.6 (34.8; 31.1)	28.8 (31.7; 28.3)	27.7 (30.5; 27.3)	28.8 (31.7; 28.3)
Mexico	26.6 (29.3; 26.2)	27.5 (30.3; 27.1)	27.4 (30.2; 27.0)	27.2 (30.0; 26.8)	27.2 (30.0; 26.8)
Ukraine	26.2 (28.9; 25.8)	42.1 (46.4; 41.4)	30.3 (33.4; 29.8)	35.9 (39.6; 35.3)	35.8 (39.5; 35.2)
Indonesia	23.6 (26.0; 23.2)	17.0 (18.7; 16.7)	16.9 (18.6; 16.6)	19.6 (21.6; 19.3)	30.3 (33.4; 29.8)
South Africa	16.1 (17.7; 15.8)	17.0 (18.7; 16.7)	15.8 (17.4; 15.6)	11.8 (13.0; 11.6)	13.1 (14.4; 12.9)
Russia	15.9 (17.5; 15.6)	15.2 (16.8; 15.0)	13.9 (15.3; 13.7)	14.3 (15.8; 14.1)	11.4 (12.6; 11.2)
Canada	14.5 (16.0; 14.3)	14.6 (16.1; 14.4)	13.6 (15.0; 13.4)	13.4 (14.8; 13.2)	13.9 (15.3; 13.7)
Nigeria	12.9 (14.2; 12.7)	12.7 (14.0; 12.5)	12.4 (13.7; 12.2)	12.6 (13.9; 12.4)	10.9 (12.0; 10.7)
France	10.9 (12.0; 10.7)	15.4 (17.0; 15.2)	13.7 (15.1; 13.5)	12.8 (14.1; 12.6)	12.6 (13.9; 12.4)
Ethiopia	10.2 (11.2; 10.0)	10.8 (11.9; 10.6)	10.0 (11.0; 9.8)	9.6 (10.6; 9.4)	10.1 (11.1; 9.9)
Romania	8.0 (8.8; 7.9)	14.8 (16.3; 14.6)	10.1 (11.1; 9.9)	17.4 (19.2; 17.1)	18.7 (20.6; 18.4)
