= List of countries by eggplant production =

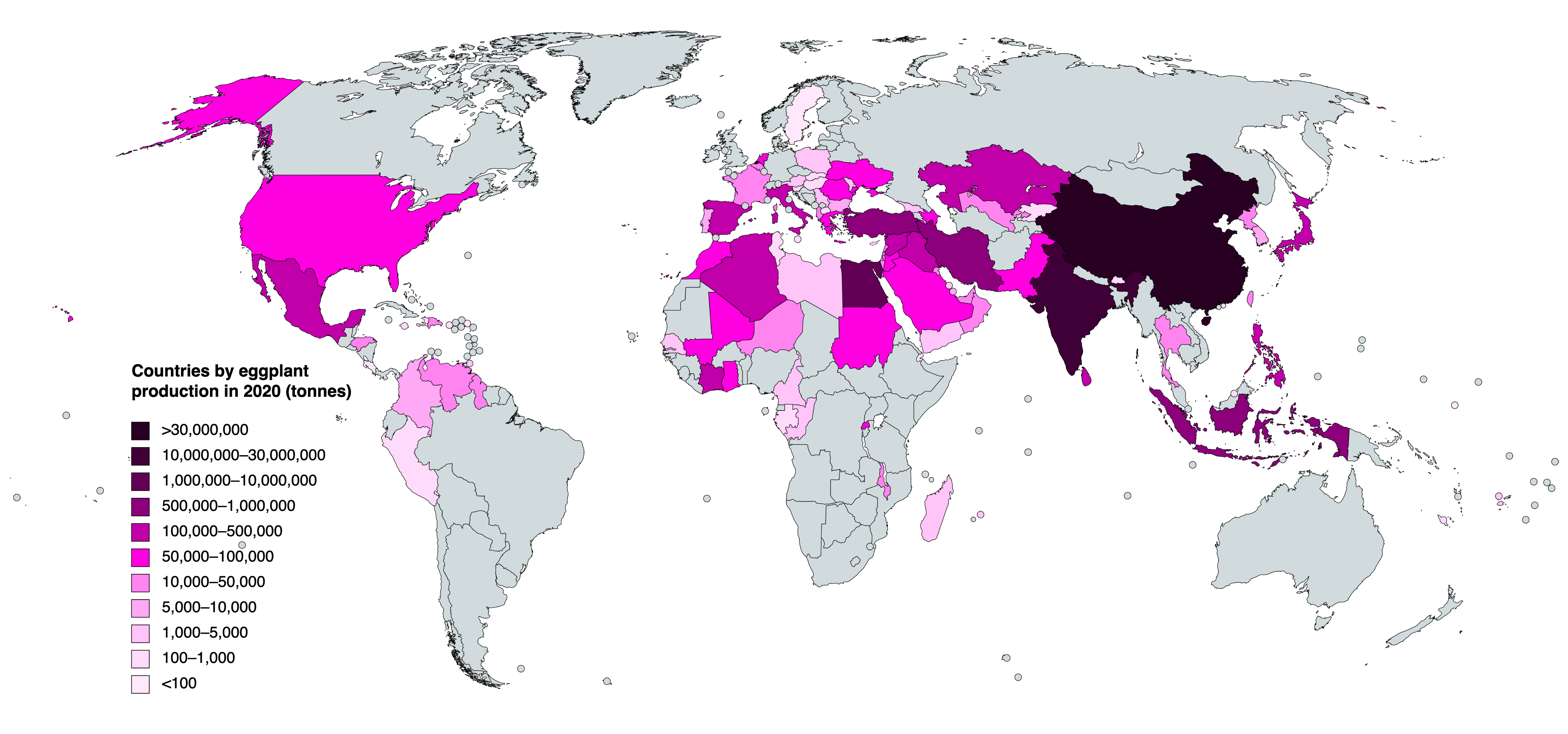
Countries by eggplant (aubergine) production in 2020

This is a list of countries by eggplant (aubergine) production from the years 2017 to 2022, based on data from the Food and Agriculture Organization Corporate Statistical Database. The estimated total world production for eggplants in 2022 was 59,312,600 metric tonnes, up by 1.0% from 58,705,398 tonnes in 2021. China was by far the largest producer of eggplants, accounting for nearly 65% of global production at 38,284,897 tonnes. Dependent territories are shown in italics.

== Production by country ==
Country/region	2022	2021	2020	2019	2018	2017
China	38,284,897	37,398,440	36,581,247	35,590,700	34,482,916	33,408,032
India	12,765,000	12,874,000	12,682,000	12,680,000	12,801,000	12,510,000
Egypt	1,396,725	1,414,860	1,278,350	1,347,230	1,179,173	1,376,303
Turkey	781,242	832,938	835,422	822,659	836,284	883,917
Indonesia	691,738	676,339	618,202	575,392	551,529	535,436
Bangladesh	618,542	587,000	558,000	530,610	516,007	507,432
Iran	595,943	598,356	595,336	594,136	605,597	586,275
Italy	307,430	306,440	304,690	300,620	298,310	286,473
Japan	294,600	297,700	297,000	301,700	300,400	307,800
Spain	276,320	265,290	282,200	245,150	238,330	225,912
Philippines	248,151	244,035	242,730	249,890	244,838	241,901
Algeria	207,549	192,893	178,417	184,145	181,618	155,878
Uzbekistan	203,889	210,300	188,000	169,200	73,900	60,364
Iraq	183,056	215,687	207,202	136,749	104,402	94,483
Syria	141,122	165,033	180,002	154,807	170,901	168,106
Sri Lanka	128,249	129,516	141,882	134,863	129,212	108,856
Kazakhstan	125,193	128,413	125,054	108,065	95,233	85,635
Saudi Arabia	118,850	112,000	109,138	50,344	25,384	23,850
Ivory Coast	110,845	107,512	109,052	106,085	102,995	99,000
Mexico	108,358	125,531	112,195	185,234	179,656	184,872
Mali	106,845	92,801	99,841	81,644	80,528	96,943
United States	98,585	98,560	98,973	98,223	98,484	100,212
Pakistan	95,001	106,177	100,184	89,724	87,587	84,255
Azerbaijan	91,675	88,932	80,637	81,479	79,724	77,817
Rwanda	89,265	94,292	83,186	77,499	79,533	51,032
Sudan	87,834	87,663	88,009	87,832	87,149	89,046
Jordan	79,854	72,307	57,356	55,630	61,254	65,319
Netherlands	66,000	63,000	65,000	62,000	55,000	53,000
Romania	64,560	95,860	88,420	79,660	88,150	127,763
Morocco	60,998	81,044	60,913	68,266	52,754	52,966
Armenia	57,348	65,123	62,408	43,900	51,300	84,500
Guyana	52,852	47,060	46,411	46,147	47,992	46,170
Ghana	52,685	52,362	52,111	53,581	51,394	51,359
North Korea	49,588	49,388	49,188	49,067	48,741	48,455
Palestine	48,731	46,356	49,060	48,490	49,247	49,279
Malaysia	46,129	42,732	39,786	–	–	–
Greece	44,500	60,030	60,980	54,910	70,940	50,548
France	42,480	44,260	57,060	29,570	31,990	30,089
Israel	38,622	51,194	47,431	49,154	51,404	48,996
Oman	38,004	36,349	39,226	30,895	32,214	32,062
Kuwait	35,514	29,533	21,596	39,385	27,602	32,075
Malawi	35,064	34,021	32,020	30,551	29,242	26,664
Albania	33,890	35,425	34,680	31,122	31,491	27,898
Taiwan	33,357	33,988	35,344	34,874	34,561	32,015
Ukraine	30,350	59,480	67,910	66,420	68,510	74,790
Lebanon	26,775	27,750	26,980	31,630	33,740	35,277
Dominican Republic	25,389	24,597	24,741	27,821	26,851	24,955
Thailand	21,032	20,931	21,236	20,927	20,629	22,153
Honduras	18,963	18,863	20,552	19,000	17,000	15,000
Venezuela	16,429	15,566	15,260	14,919	13,487	14,188
United Arab Emirates	15,158	17,761	20,571	26,982	20,859	20,486
Niger	14,967	15,878	16,363	11,029	8,512	8,886
Belgium	13,800	14,160	11,400	10,580	10,120	8,100
Colombia	13,584	15,556	16,569	6,944	5,658	4,177
Bulgaria	9,690	7,800	9,920	11,180	11,260	11,908
Fiji	7,128	4,689	4,147	2,526	2,424	1,366
Moldova	6,200	4,800	4,183	5,401	5,022	4,352
Qatar	5,684	6,248	5,770	5,393	2,902	3,829
Portugal	5,390	10,160	6,500	5,660	6,850	5,267
South Korea	5,141	5,118	5,131	5,175	5,049	5,168
Yemen	4,712	4,754	4,796	4,900	4,725	4,670
Senegal	4,372	4,349	4,363	4,406	4,278	4,404
Mauritius	3,165	3,093	3,496	3,385	2,495	3,099
Georgia	2,900	3,000	4,100	4,400	3,700	2,600
Congo	2,621	2,628	2,624	2,612	2,649	2,611
Libya	2,570	3,881	2,900	1,500	1,540	2,960
Cameroon	2,177	2,181	2,179	2,172	2,193	2,172
Serbia	2,052	2,053	2,054	2,046	2,054	2,052
Madagascar	1,786	1,793	1,790	1,776	1,813	1,780
Austria	1,770	1,810	1,420	1,170	1,130	1,062
Bahrain	1,626	1,590	1,500	1,418	1,394	1,234
Croatia	1,500	–	–	–	–	–
Cyprus	1,300	1,310	1,340	1,230	1,710	2,192
Puerto Rico	1,081	1.074	1,075	1,044	966	1,056
North Macedonia	971	977	972	964	995	955
Poland	900	2,400	500	–	–	–
Trinidad and Tobago	886	1,334	2,325	1,467	488	915
Haiti	862	861	859	858	855	853
Malta	820	730	850	860	840	792
Hungary	740	1,060	830	800	990	826
Tunisia	708	703	699	711	717	714
Kyrgyzstan	585	578	564	614	555	522
Dominica	503	503	504	503	503	505
Jamaica	460	423	352	357	385	405
Slovenia	340	420	550	500	330	–
Peru	286	491	427	356	476	261
Hong Kong	271	271	270	273	275	275
Brunei	211	298	341	292	283	623
Bhutan	197	303	429	300	245	643
New Caledonia	153	124	198	146	183	187
Gabon	102	102	101	102	100	99
Costa Rica	96	97	97	96	98	96
Djibouti	59	58	57	58	57	54
Antigua and Barbuda	35	33	34	74	123	190
Sweden	20	20	20	–	–	–
Nauru	1	1	1	1	0	0
