= List of countries by gas turbine exports =

The following is a list of countries by gas turbine exports.

== International Trade Centre ==
Data is for 2024, in thousands of United States dollars and tons/units.

List of countries by gas turbine exports (2024)
Country	Value exported (thousands USD)	Trade balance (thousands USD)	Quantity exported	
Country	Value exported (thousands USD)	Trade balance (thousands USD)	Value	Units
World	177,737,345	−55,321,957	–	–
United Kingdom	35,068,787	12,353,409	18,341	Tons
France	22,017,242	4,423,892	23,462	Tons
Singapore	19,654,771	−4,997,200	–	–
Hong Kong	15,018,569	−4,478,454	–	–
United States	14,086,694	−16,782,139	11,571,605	Units
Germany	8,187,048	−7,377,986	23,299	Tons
Canada	7,730,527	−49,618	–	–
Poland	6,020,331	1,318,945	7,596	Tons
India	5,063,288	1,620,935	–	–
Italy	4,756,551	1,768,807	30,584	Tons
Japan	4,648,865	−4,355,864	12,024	Tons
Mexico	4,436,379	793,147	–	–
Netherlands	3,860,150	624,601	3,526	Tons
China	3,673,956	−8,972,297	42,060	Tons
Spain	2,774,875	−344,105	3,118	Tons
Sweden	1,823,134	839,546	4,261	Tons
South Korea	1,503,058	−1,176,281	2,139	Tons
Thailand	1,494,568	−589,701	–	–
Switzerland	1,346,339	248,382	3,159	Tons
Hungary	1,271,290	214,857	–	–
Ireland	1,250,766	−324,142	1,691	Tons
Belgium	1,201,786	−516,210	2,407	Tons
Turkey	1,069,734	−511,997	40,732	Tons
Taiwan	1,046,743	−2,182,779	800	Tons
Vietnam	1,030,165	−71,323	–	–
Czech Republic	803,780	−1,041	4,650	Tons
Israel	762,317	−191,907	–	–
Norway	606,688	−515,311	1,208	Tons
Brazil	510,483	−7,975,093	481	Tons
Serbia	427,602	82,919	9,033	Tons
Malaysia	405,637	−1,737,111	–	–
Australia	338,795	−1,281,093	–	–
Saudi Arabia	319,119	−1,171,556	2,024	Tons
United Arab Emirates	299,291	−3,698,487	–	–
Russia	251,466	−80,259	–	–
Austria	245,102	63,192	3,442	Tons
Finland	227,975	−2,315	190	Tons
Morocco	185,706	−567,693	–	–
Indonesia	176,016	−333,147	1,061	Tons
Romania	175,915	−153,690	2,380	Tons
Kazakhstan	162,254	−137,603	64	Tons
Qatar	152,910	−1,418,614	–	–
Ukraine	147,722	93,696	181	Tons
Chile	106,058	24,682	–	–
Greece	100,297	−73,678	74	Tons
Denmark	94,968	−67,922	299	Tons
Croatia	91,035	16,379	1,192	Tons
Tunisia	84,661	23,670	–	–
Slovenia	83,704	73,655	1,045	Tons
Bahrain	81,674	−190,542	46	Tons
Bulgaria	77,111	−36,237	83	Tons
South Africa	60,772	−181,229	–	–
Lithuania	53,025	9,770	40	Tons
Ethiopia	52,537	−486,901	–	–
Uzbekistan	42,882	−70,165	–	–
Algeria	42,593	−280,239	–	–
Oman	34,639	−433,494	–	–
Pakistan	33,111	−81,748	–	–
Jordan	30,414	−342,694	–	–
Malta	26,725	−13,698	24	Tons
Angola	24,621	−103,848	159	Tons
Kuwait	24,110	−292,943	144	Tons
Georgia	24,040	−18,171	46	Tons
Iraq	23,825	−392,029	45	Tons
New Zealand	22,330	−1,519,512	140	Tons
Estonia	20,959	−370	31	Tons
Philippines	20,582	−662,972	400	Tons
Colombia	17,903	−76,131	149	Tons
Côte d'Ivoire	17,595	−6,542	50	Tons
Portugal	17,049	−252,116	130	Tons
Trinidad and Tobago	13,401	−81,652	31	Tons
Slovakia	11,025	−91,983	241	Tons
Azerbaijan	10,952	−108,906	52	Tons
Guyana	10,455	−106,138	7	Tons
Latvia	9,401	−6,393	8	Tons
Egypt	8,923	−81,800	–	–
Paraguay	8,803	8,695	10	Tons
Iran	8,400	−22,056	34	Tons
Luxembourg	7,332	−9,993	198	Tons
Mozambique	6,717	−2,571	–	–
Myanmar	5,500	−4,008	536	Tons
Bolivia	4,749	−57,005	25	Tons
Venezuela	4,136	−18,981	–	–
Kenya	4,015	−33,200	19	Tons
Kyrgyzstan	3,666	−8,567	80	Tons
Bosnia and Herzegovina	3,552	2,927	5	Tons
Bermuda	3,425	3,425	–	–
Dominican Republic	2,984	−107,020	53	Tons
Sri Lanka	2,943	−53,720	–	–
Libya	2,596	−144,371	15	Tons
Cayman Islands	2,543	2,240	–	–
North Macedonia	2,226	402	8	Tons
Mongolia	1,957	−423	1	Tons
Brunei	1,866	−29,713	–	–
Belarus	1,852	1,642	9	Tons
Peru	1,774	−70,767	15	Tons
Seychelles	1,745	−285	20	Tons
Namibia	1,577	−3,230	2	Tons
Ecuador	1,556	−3,977	23	Tons
Sao Tome and Principe	1,551	1,551	–	–
Nigeria	1,462	−173,606	–	–
Costa Rica	1,209	−1,157	10	Tons
Uganda	1,207	−26,248	–	–
Suriname	1,205	579	–	–
Cambodia	1,105	−1,210	5	Tons
New Caledonia	1,029	−3,751	–	–
Sierra Leone	882	817	–	–
Curaçao	836	−1,745	–	–
Tanzania	792	−40,943	2	Tons
Botswana	673	−7,745	6	Tons
Solomon Islands	649	465	–	–
Mali	624	321	–	–
United States Minor; Outlying Islands	620	−748	8	Tons
Saint Lucia	607	607	–	–
Senegal	598	−31,079	15	Tons
Ghana	562	−81,552	–	–
DR Congo	559	−7,145	–	–
Eswatini	558	−18	1	Tons
Gabon	552	−5,299	1	Tons
Togo	536	−60	10	Tons
Moldova	510	−847	6	Tons
Bhutan	501	466	1	Units
South Sudan	464	−1,573	–	–
Montenegro	446	−3,138	5	Tons
Cameroon	414	−3,301	–	–
Palau	411	411	2	Units
Turkmenistan	408	−21,131	–	–
Tajikistan	394	248	–	–
Somalia	384	293	1	Tons
Papua New Guinea	326	−52,457	–	–
Bahamas	320	−4,169	22,420	Units
Bangladesh	305	−108,952	–	–
Panama	304	−23,408	37	Tons
Fiji	295	−1,345	30	Units
Equatorial Guinea	287	−11,420	–	–
Nepal	282	−22,966	–	–
El Salvador	236	−1,706	23	Tons
Aruba	220	−6,650	–	–
Lebanon	206	−27,024	–	–
Saint Helena	195	195	–	–
Barbados	194	−2,362	2	Tons
Jamaica	177	−5,842	–	–
Western Sahara	150	144	1	Tons
Pitcairn	141	−145	–	–
Zimbabwe	96	−942	1	Tons
Mauritius	83	−2,240	2	Tons
Guinea	81	−1,219	–	–
Rwanda	70	−1,141	–	–
Christmas Island	52	52	30	Units
Uruguay	51	−10,324	19	Tons
Zambia	50	−3,279	–	–
Andorra	48	48	–	–
Guatemala	34	−1,925	8	Tons
Nicaragua	34	−978	46	Tons
Afghanistan	33	33	–	–
Laos	30	−723	–	–
Cook Islands	28	−552	–	–
Benin	25	−394	2	Tons
Tonga	22	22	–	–
Grenada	17	−447	–	–
Kiribati	16	16	–	–
British Virgin Islands	14	−257	–	–
Honduras	9	−1,609	2	Tons
Yemen	7	−13,366	–	–
Burkina Faso	6	−1,619	6	Tons
Iceland	6	−80,105	27	Tons
French Southern and Antarctic Territories	6	−64	–	–
Lesotho	6	−1	32	Tons
Madagascar	5	−294	16	Tons
Liberia	5	−11,007	1	Units
Saint Vincent and the Grenadines	5	−100	–	–
Sint Maarten (Dutch part)	4	4	–	–
British Indian Ocean Territory	3	3	3	Units
Turks and Caicos Islands	3	3	–	–
Burundi	2	0	7	Tons
Armenia	1	−14,834	–	–
Cuba	1	−1,649	–	–
Niger	1	−29	–	–
Vanuatu	1	−44	–	–
Northern Mariana Islands	1	−3	–	–
Marshall Islands	1	−302	1	Units

== Observatory of Economic Complexity ==
Data is for 2023, in United States dollars.

List of countries by gas turbine exports (2023)
Country	Trade value
United States	38,011,701,625
United Kingdom	35,648,585,362
France	18,442,858,990
Hong Kong	8,742,941,378
Germany	8,362,524,757
Canada	8,309,699,578
Singapore	6,806,262,645
Japan	5,855,046,364
China	4,621,894,276
Italy	4,372,322,621
Mexico	3,515,074,882
India	3,152,907,349
Poland	2,558,944,926
Netherlands	2,466,411,884
Spain	2,120,078,574
Sweden	1,783,259,063
United Arab Emirates	1,754,372,992
Taiwan	1,521,743,208
Switzerland	1,504,622,650
Hungary	1,427,327,450
Thailand	1,091,749,692
South Korea	1,089,158,619
Israel	1,064,808,925
Luxembourg	1,049,875,913
Turkey	950,003,568
Ireland	940,934,360
Belgium	823,694,034
Brazil	757,729,947
Vietnam	638,840,792
Czech Republic	597,474,099
Malaysia	573,022,219
Norway	530,397,079
Qatar	315,083,752
Austria	288,766,160
Serbia	287,494,348
Bahrain	287,364,487
Romania	282,806,941
Saudi Arabia	263,180,619
Ukraine	257,233,827
Russia	246,332,800
Finland	208,490,860
Australia	195,037,573
Philippines	192,053,025
Portugal	151,227,215
Morocco	150,141,332
Denmark	146,794,789
Greece	125,331,819
Indonesia	111,417,478
Croatia	99,963,542
Estonia	90,783,321
Oman	82,700,370
Pakistan	76,070,123
Slovakia	74,697,283
Tunisia	63,042,900
South Africa	60,472,469
Slovenia	55,964,011
Bulgaria	44,403,694
New Zealand	44,379,656
Lithuania	44,027,782
Kuwait	38,042,048
Ethiopia	35,864,733
Kazakhstan	32,621,103
Peru	29,796,791
Aruba	26,760,563
Azerbaijan	25,302,437
Kyrgyzstan	24,042,703
Colombia	21,788,396
Algeria	20,841,268
Jordan	20,112,336
Chile	19,674,248
Nigeria	19,283,523
Egypt	15,315,032
Malta	14,477,574
Sri Lanka	12,480,294
Argentina	12,278,095
Yemen	10,110,127
Gabon	7,662,401
French Polynesia	7,514,478
Macau	7,087,774
Mozambique	6,793,832
Latvia	6,543,030
Uzbekistan	6,432,672
Kenya	5,901,006
Turkmenistan	5,449,556
Iran	5,330,292
Cote d'Ivoire	4,902,859
Armenia	4,381,627
Brunei	3,952,858
Bosnia and Herzegovina	2,790,057
Montenegro	2,719,556
Georgia	2,520,868
Niger	2,461,365
Belarus	2,392,000
Costa Rica	2,182,284
Saint Lucia	2,068,055
Mali	2,049,992
Guatemala	1,917,601
Bangladesh	1,858,591
Papua New Guinea	1,796,571
Uganda	1,710,969
American Samoa	1,696,607
Angola	1,654,341
Tanzania	1,516,159
DR Congo	1,503,586
Bolivia	1,438,497
Cyprus	1,361,772
Suriname	1,328,126
Sao Tome and Principe	1,196,990
El Salvador	1,192,818
Dominican Republic	1,164,421
Ghana	1,158,391
Senegal	1,099,739
Nepal	1,027,835
Antigua and Barbuda	953,332
Ecuador	922,879
Cayman Islands	898,599
Iceland	893,069
Trinidad and Tobago	870,800
Cambodia	782,849
Burkina Faso	766,096
Namibia	694,229
Kiribati	668,003
Laos	619,933
New Caledonia	530,274
Guam	529,891
Togo	513,332
Fiji	493,866
Bahamas	448,175
Zambia	414,510
Moldova	385,914
Lebanon	379,723
Mauritania	373,412
Uruguay	344,835
Iraq	338,779
Curacao	337,338
Cape Verde	314,885
Panama	308,185
Somalia	305,882
Mauritius	284,582
Libya	281,513
Guyana	238,926
Bhutan	235,281
Myanmar	233,843
Malawi	208,607
Greenland	197,425
Bonaire	173,419
Tokelau	167,326
Mongolia	166,825
Pitcairn Islands	151,555
Seychelles	125,524
French South Antarctic Territory	118,191
Dominica	117,769
Jamaica	116,538
Zimbabwe	116,278
Barbados	113,556
Wallis and Futuna	105,355
Grenada	102,650
Eswatini	90,754
Afghanistan	70,080
Tonga	61,741
Syria	60,872
South Sudan	58,243
Equatorial Guinea	55,675
Haiti	52,687
Chad	51,237
Gambia	43,302
Saint Martin	38,944
Botswana	33,462
Andorra	32,958
Benin	28,660
Cameroon	25,835
Timor-Leste	25,592
Honduras	25,577
Nicaragua	25,159
Tajikistan	24,924
Madagascar	22,739
Rwanda	18,330
Guinea	17,166
Cook Islands	16,850
Montserrat	16,756
Venezuela	10,087
North Macedonia	6,654
Nauru	6,257
Belize	5,817
Vanuatu	5,411
Cocos (Keeling) Islands	5,325
Maldives	4,297
North Korea	3,974
Sierra Leone	2,570
Northern Mariana Islands	1,978
Lesotho	1,480
Turks and Caicos Islands	1,000
Saint Vincent and the Grenadines	370
Saint Helena	187
Paraguay	100
Central African Republic	93
Sudan	46
