= List of countries by refined petroleum exports =

The following is a list of countries by exports of refined petroleum, including gasoline. Data is for 2024, in billions of United States dollars. Currently, the top 25 countries are listed according to Worlds Top Exports ranking.

| Country | Value (billion US$) | % of exports |
|---|---|---|
| World | ~900.0 | 100.0 |
| Others | ~132.3 | 14.6 |
| United States | 117.5 | 13.1 |
| India | 70.2 | 7.8 |
| Netherlands | 60.8 | 6.8 |
| Singapore | 54.6 | 6.1 |
| South Korea | 49.5 | 5.5 |
| Russia | 46.8 | 5.2 |
| United Arab Emirates | 44.3 | 4.9 |
| Belgium | 42.5 | 4.7 |
| China | 42.4 | 4.7 |
| Kuwait | 29.8 | 3.3 |
| Malaysia | 25.7 | 2.9 |
| Germany | 21.6 | 2.4 |
| Italy | 16.7 | 1.9 |
| Canada | 15.0 | 1.7 |
| Spain | 14.7 | 1.6 |
| Turkey | 14.0 | 1.6 |
| Greece | 13.8 | 1.5 |
| Oman | 12.6 | 1.4 |
| Taiwan | 12.3 | 1.4 |
| Qatar | 12.0 | 1.3 |
| Brazil | 11.7 | 1.3 |
| United Kingdom | 10.9 | 1.2 |
| France | 10.2 | 1.1 |
| Sweden | 9.3 | 1.0 |
| Algeria | 8.8 | 1.0 |
