= List of countries by public spending in tertiary education =

This is a list of countries ranked by public (government) spending per student in tertiary education as relative to GDP per capita. This amount is relative and does not indicate the absolute level of public spending on higher education.

Data from 2010 to 2019
Country	% of GDP
Afghanistan	58.2
Albania	13.8
Andorra	22.3
Argentina	16.9
Armenia	9.9
Aruba (Netherlands)	100.2
Australia	17.8
Austria	36.2
Azerbaijan	19.4
Bahrain	21.4
Bangladesh	29.9
Barbados	41.7
Belarus	17.9
Belgium	32.2
Belize	27.3
Bermuda	23.9
Bhutan	50.7
Bosnia and Herzegovina	23.7
Brazil	33.0
British Virgin Islands (United Kingdom)	40.0
Brunei	31.9
Bulgaria	16.6
Cambodia	5.3
Cameroon	19.4
Canada	31.4
Cape Verde	38.3
Central African Republic	100.5
Chad	186.7
Chile	20.3
Colombia	21.6
Costa Rica	37.5
Croatia	25.7
Cyprus	26.5
Czech Republic	20.3
Denmark	43.1
Djibouti	193
Ecuador	52.7
El Salvador	11.1
Eritrea	592.3
Estonia	36.9
Eswatini	128.2
European Union	26.3
Finland	33.9
France	31.6
Georgia	10.0
Germany	33.6
Ghana	55.5
Greece	11.2
Grenada	5.2
Guatemala	18.1
Guyana	13.7
Honduras	40.9
Hong Kong	24.2
Hungary	25.4
Iceland	27.3
India	49.3
Indonesia	20.8
Iran	24.2
Ireland	15.5
Israel	18.2
Italy	24.3
Jamaica	36.6
Japan	20.6
Jordan	25.3
Kazakhstan	7.5
Kenya	76.4
Kyrgyzstan	4.9
Laos	20.3
Latvia	17.7
Lebanon	19.5
Lesotho	44.7
Lithuania	18.0
Luxembourg	42.8
Macau (People's Republic of China)	19.1
Malaysia	23.8
Mali	166.9
Malta	44.4
Mauritania	95.8
Mauritius	9.6
Mexico	29.7
Moldova	26.6
Mongolia	5.2
Mozambique	165.6
Myanmar	16.7
Namibia	76.0
Nepal	24.2
Netherlands	35.8
New Zealand	25.3
Norway	39.8
Pakistan	67.2
Panama	18.7
Paraguay	14.3
Peru	10.9
Poland	25.4
Portugal	26.9
Romania	26.1
Russia	19.8
Rwanda	97.7
San Marino	8.7
Senegal	131.0
Serbia	29.8
Singapore	23.5
Slovakia	27.6
Slovenia	24.3
South Africa	48.0
South Korea	15.0
Spain	21.8
Sri Lanka	31.6
Sweden	43.2
Switzerland	37.4
Tajikistan	19.6
Thailand	18.2
Tunisia	54.7
Turkey	35.3
Turks and Caicos Islands	87.6
Ukraine (excluding territories in dispute)	34.5
United Kingdom	38.0
United States	19.4
Uruguay	25.4
Vietnam	34.2
Zimbabwe	161.4
