= List of countries by copper exports =

The following is a list of countries by refined copper exports.

== International Trade Centre ==
Data is for 2024, in thousands of United States dollars and tons.

List of countries by copper exports (2024)
Country	Value exported (thousands USD)	Trade balance (thousands USD)	Quantity exported (tons)
World	102,192,808	−4,797,396	43,399,582
Chile	30,088,105	29,994,885	14,490,524
Peru	20,670,497	20,572,310	9,596,426
Indonesia	7,969,175	7,968,251	2,470,134
Brazil	4,158,522	4,158,520	1,421,514
Australia	4,096,804	4,096,646	1,312,432
Canada	3,772,318	3,006,020	349,076
Mexico	3,718,890	2,641,809	1,722,560
Mongolia	3,319,119	3,319,115	1,695,401
Kazakhstan	3,159,590	3,093,143	1,852,074
DR Congo	2,973,404	2,973,404	791,392
United States	2,810,622	2,810,301	325,272
Russia	1,477,299	1,249,165	488,278
Philippines	1,305,593	−1,012,500	457,425
Papua New Guinea	1,300,358	1,300,358	384,657
Serbia	1,241,595	931,457	754,769
Ecuador	1,163,041	1,163,041	523,661
Spain	1,044,298	−1,537,315	630,374
Taiwan	742,210	−118,088	257,946
Botswana	736,900	736,898	354,534
Saudi Arabia	694,337	692,557	321,879
South Korea	684,902	−4,460,453	326,893
Turkey	661,825	661,711	473,438
Armenia	558,278	558,278	341,503
Bulgaria	507,686	−2,031,014	452,719
Laos	470,158	470,043	182,113
Portugal	419,202	406,000	246,245
Tanzania	252,478	252,476	36,878
Eritrea	251,024	251,024	107,959
South Africa	226,218	226,160	143,938
Sweden	208,902	-460,044	33,157
Mauritania	205,610	205,610	89,334
United Arab Emirates	179,407	178,658	91,973
Morocco	149,892	149,892	89,508
Dominican Republic	116,410	116,274	70,519
Germany	104,220	−2,363,232	38,715
Georgia	93,043	93,043	43,076
Colombia	86,384	86,384	46,017
Malaysia	80,724	−225,706	67,079
Romania	77,920	77,911	43,478
North Macedonia	72,814	72,814	35,341
Finland	54,677	−1,024,820	24,632
Albania	46,511	46,511	31,456
Namibia	29,908	−398,595	21,355
Zambia	27,040	−121,122	53,945
Bolivia	26,340	26,340	10,851
India	23,260	−3,743,664	14,434
Belgium	21,349	19,550	3,850
Kyrgyzstan	19,247	19,241	14,399
Tajikistan	17,389	17,389	4,918
Oman	16,591	16,473	9,208
France	16,161	15,996	4,951
Vietnam	10,611	9,956	7,122
Congo	10,548	10,548	5,057
Iran	4,913	-6,114	3,823
Kenya	4,726	4,726	12,207
Pakistan	3,996	3,996	6,464
Azerbaijan	2,090	2,090	1,221
Hong Kong	1,951	-6	1,563
Poland	1,796	−619,839	3,047
Singapore	881	309	673
Zimbabwe	641	641	1,026
Netherlands	628	301	230
Italy	555	155	82
Nigeria	363	363	691
United Kingdom	191	-54	71
Nicaragua	174	174	1,112
Uzbekistan	166	−237,751	153
Madagascar	151	151	132
Mozambique	76	76	526
China	42	−67,454,395	114
Thailand	22	−250	1
Libya	18	18	50
Israel	11	10	6
Greece	2	−4	1
Austria	2	−6	0
Switzerland	2	−7	0
Egypt	1	1	0
Ethiopia	1	1	0

== Observatory of Economic Complexity ==
Data is for 2023, in United States dollars.

List of countries by copper exports
Country	Trade value
Chile	24,329,342,088
Peru	20,007,915,042
Indonesia	8,316,872,958
Australia	3,624,767,792
Brazil	3,478,895,092
Mexico	3,201,432,658
Canada	3,172,393,938
Kazakhstan	3,068,888,746
United States	2,965,874,504
Panama	2,755,631,800
Mongolia	2,647,593,943
DR Congo	2,284,763,795
Serbia	1,529,239,201
Ecuador	1,237,787,141
Russia	954,917,802
Spain	832,253,605
Taiwan	798,820,177
Papua New Guinea	758,282,478
Saudi Arabia	611,132,458
Botswana	566,452,851
Philippines	561,693,232
Armenia	544,561,152
Turkey	487,483,651
Malaysia	475,156,677
Laos	427,978,861
Bulgaria	345,087,878
Portugal	286,207,650
Georgia	284,861,068
Tanzania	252,400,864
South Africa	240,891,819
Eritrea	166,577,089
Mauritania	162,103,474
Morocco	157,761,489
Singapore	119,339,114
Colombia	88,154,696
Switzerland	79,638,471
Montenegro	73,761,242
Zambia	73,024,856
India	71,546,325
North Macedonia	70,743,885
Dominican Republic	70,570,620
China	66,403,697
Finland	62,753,624
Romania	58,182,323
Tajikistan	47,860,281
Croatia	38,870,738
France	34,648,590
Albania	34,201,640
Kyrgyzstan	33,061,054
Namibia	31,628,035
Congo	27,588,046
Sweden	26,033,451
Vietnam	21,714,114
Azerbaijan	19,154,741
Bolivia	18,952,822
Germany	16,610,677
Pakistan	12,770,700
Myanmar	12,638,691
South Korea	10,234,777
Iran	8,619,706
United Arab Emirates	7,872,460
Japan	5,668,794
Hong Kong	5,292,972
Kenya	2,329,263
United Kingdom	2,144,662
Nicaragua	2,086,366
Netherlands	1,346,485
Belgium	855,738
Zimbabwe	729,047
Italy	578,009
Thailand	452,273
Argentina	327,130
Norway	298,507
Greece	294,044
Austria	190,737
Niger	182,192
Mauritius	144,186
Madagascar	123,255
Nigeria	107,456
Egypt	66,802
Hungary	53,921
Burundi	52,204
Mozambique	34,188
Oman	33,291
Sudan	28,045
Israel	27,001
Qatar	26,198
Somalia	25,465
Bosnia and Herzegovina	16,452
Uzbekistan	15,595
Mali	10,576
Cambodia	2,850
Denmark	1,622
Benin	1,319
Guatemala	814
Angola	496
Lebanon	408
Nepal	381
Ethiopia	303
El Salvador	240
Poland	150
Bangladesh	104
Tunisia	91
Burkina Faso	80
Algeria	76
Kuwait	36
Uruguay	26
Senegal	23
Cuba	18
Estonia	11
Ireland	2

== Sources ==
- Observatory of Economic complexity - Countries that export Refined Copper (2012)
