= List of countries by ship exports =

The following is a list of countries by passenger and cargo ship exports, using the Harmonised System code 8901.

== International Trade Centre ==
Data is for 2024, in thousands of United States dollars and tons/units.

List of countries by ship exports (2024)
Country	Value exported (thousands USD)	Trade balance (thousands USD)	Quantity exported	
Country	Value exported (thousands USD)	Trade balance (thousands USD)	Value	Units
World	94,790,927	44,729,485	–	–
China	40,109,193	40,063,435	17,206,321	Tons
South Korea	22,240,472	19,256,708	10,989,866	Tons
Japan	9,526,215	9,445,115	–	–
Germany	3,259,444	−1,111,572	1,178,026	Tons
Italy	2,923,854	2,391,864	283,738	Tons
India	2,698,844	1,224,346	–	–
France	2,275,841	302,403	111,844	Tons
Poland	1,575,203	100,947	692,510	Tons
Finland	1,396,955	1,351,747	154,088	Tons
Denmark	1,043,294	−1,441,795	–	–
Angola	784,617	772,971	185,354	Tons
Marshall Islands	623,982	−7,079,918	–	–
Turkey	585,681	398,143	229,767	Tons
Saudi Arabia	569,811	542,421	189,996	Tons
Philippines	538,891	330,942	768,841	Tons
Thailand	470,453	−278,278	84	Units
Liberia	460,257	−16,254,710	–	–
Cyprus	445,526	−329,887	59	Units
Netherlands	443,960	33,245	180,949	Tons
Romania	397,403	386,009	49,402	Tons
Indonesia	285,627	−650,180	162,248	Tons
Singapore	211,296	209,585	9,176	Units
Vietnam	171,698	−30,685	–	–
Trinidad and Tobago	145,996	33,696	4,004	Tons
United Arab Emirates	145,618	−1,176,411	–	–
Norway	120,094	−655,578	90,952	Tons
Serbia	105,883	31,520	26,596	Tons
Iraq	92,045	92,043	106,200	Tons
Sweden	80,367	−273,547	30,138	Tons
Côte d'Ivoire	74,170	38,574	5,736	Tons
Belgium	70,706	15,181	5,092	Tons
Taiwan	60,399	−4,477	48,543	Tons
Faroe Islands	52,015	3,860	18,609	Tons
United Kingdom	51,270	−21,728	9,152	Tons
Switzerland	51,036	−98,087	346	Tons
Greece	46,875	29,729	3,239	Tons
Cayman Islands	46,493	21,477	11,176	Tons
Australia	44,511	−144,968	566	Units
Papua New Guinea	44,188	43,362	62,659	Tons
United States	42,483	38,511	272	Units
Jamaica	39,774	37,299	29,649	Tons
Nigeria	39,177	23,848	42,973	Tons
Spain	38,266	−188,760	15,149	Tons
Sri Lanka	34,937	34,426	11	Units
Iceland	34,335	25,049	4,449	Tons
Hong Kong	31,183	−129,651	37	Units
Chile	28,518	−76,377	8	Units
Saint Vincent and the Grenadines	27,231	−20,755	415	Tons
Ukraine	21,735	14,514	16,701	Tons
Malaysia	20,913	20,312	27	Units
Bangladesh	19,740	−181,865	–	–
Gibraltar	17,243	4,176	10,090	Tons
South Africa	12,623	−10,221	692	Units
Canada	10,105	−447,503	31	Units
Guyana	9,751	−40,373	129	Tons
Peru	9,538	−14,370	38,488	Tons
Slovakia	9,148	7,389	689	Tons
Russia	8,315	−232,209	–	–
Portugal	7,872	−15,584	34	Units
Kiribati	7,704	−4,870	1,679	Tons
Czech Republic	5,826	−687	355	Tons
Montenegro	4,990	4,175	944	Tons
Palau	4,465	−8,417	1,994	Tons
New Zealand	4,317	−11,795	1,579	Tons
Qatar	4,177	−79,833	–	–
Croatia	3,943	−40,430	1,711	Tons
Ecuador	3,093	3,092	4,902	Tons
Austria	2,861	1,744	2,350	Tons
Bulgaria	2,836	147	3,068	Tons
Bahamas	2,611	−4,581	3	Units
Colombia	2,328	−2,587	2,583	Tons
Ireland	1,769	−48,960	119	Tons
Kazakhstan	877	−2,042	1,685	Tons
Maldives	588	−26,238	1	Units
Estonia	524	−4,458	44	Tons
Vanuatu	515	−3,788	1	Units
Senegal	506	−22,847	15	Tons
Pakistan	438	438	3,954	Units
Lebanon	271	267	1	Units
Tunisia	256	256	34	Tons
Curaçao	251	182	125	Tons
Kenya	241	50	8	Tons
Kuwait	233	−543	43	Tons
Cambodia	143	−33,917	5	Tons
Israel	141	−79,368	–	–
Hungary	124	−3,362	1,121	Tons
Zimbabwe	110	−516	31	Tons
DR Congo	60	−15,509	31	Tons
Tanzania	42	−9,087	180	Tons
Fiji	33	−9,295	1	Units
Luxembourg	25	−22,690	2	Units
Zambia	19	−288	25	Tons
Costa Rica	18	−10,237	0	Tons
Brazil	17	−84,414	2	Tons
Lithuania	17	−5,319	2	Tons
Namibia	11	−501	2	Tons
Egypt	8	−238	0	Tons
Botswana	7	−257	7	Tons
Guatemala	5	−54	40	Tons
Mozambique	5	−15,265	–	–
Laos	4	−32	1	Units
Bahrain	3	−34,223	12	Tons
United States Minor Outlying Islands	3	−1,092	1,721	Units
Brunei	1	1	1	Units

== Observatory of Economic Complexity ==
Data is for 2023, in United States dollars.

List of countries by ship exports (2023)
Country	Trade value
China	17,562,613,164
Japan	9,706,745,658
Germany	3,753,390,584
South Korea	2,847,813,459
United Arab Emirates	2,430,044,773
Italy	2,314,335,633
Finland	2,258,592,526
Denmark	1,744,430,121
Singapore	1,627,455,842
Cyprus	1,321,874,834
United Kingdom	1,216,164,000
France	1,192,174,203
India	1,131,764,573
Belgium	1,017,372,221
Saudi Arabia	824,178,549
Turkey	695,901,436
Cote d'Ivoire	632,157,682
Netherlands	631,026,117
Norway	605,863,825
Hong Kong	476,754,508
Marshall Islands	420,402,720
Indonesia	344,260,324
Panama	336,539,306
Taiwan	289,055,803
Croatia	287,724,657
Malta	220,292,748
Gabon	174,573,803
Thailand	168,544,076
United States	157,099,164
Liberia	152,508,985
Greece	136,171,085
Australia	119,536,305
Romania	110,646,219
Oman	98,134,644
Spain	94,952,229
Bahamas	85,824,630
Bermuda	80,618,677
Nigeria	78,683,867
Malaysia	74,366,132
Vietnam	68,612,866
Serbia	59,775,091
Brazil	58,093,843
Sri Lanka	52,586,060
New Zealand	52,476,068
Russia	37,519,230
Philippines	36,346,719
Sweden	35,617,579
Chile	34,424,226
Mauritius	32,635,530
Ireland	31,279,471
British Virgin Islands	29,315,947
Lebanon	27,999,741
Poland	27,903,615
Switzerland	26,660,533
Canada	26,336,391
Israel	20,787,000
Bahrain	20,127,683
Vanuatu	18,860,863
Tunisia	17,837,228
Kazakhstan	15,004,953
Czech Republic	14,863,447
Azerbaijan	14,645,618
Iceland	14,557,147
Luxembourg	10,593,521
Morocco	9,433,322
Gibraltar	9,430,825
Estonia	9,067,391
Slovakia	9,037,077
Portugal	7,562,765
South Africa	7,231,465
Egypt	6,905,997
Antigua and Barbuda	6,862,189
Greenland	6,642,386
Barbados	5,424,000
Hungary	3,406,591
Seychelles	3,404,122
Bulgaria	2,426,767
North Korea	2,035,146
Colombia	1,843,453
Austria	1,820,386
Latvia	1,809,074
Tanzania	1,479,222
Cocos (Keeling) Islands	1,363,961
Peru	1,081,544
Lithuania	1,034,069
Costa Rica	785,175
Slovenia	696,770
Sierra Leone	648,761
Ukraine	542,184
Fiji	527,768
Pakistan	391,096
Cook Islands	377,838
Iran	353,706
Comoros	339,735
Togo	326,009
Jordan	239,662
Mexico	232,136
Montenegro	224,447
Eswatini	202,343
Zimbabwe	189,582
Botswana	150,781
Namibia	136,683
Mozambique	125,300
Kuwait	118,032
Saint Vincent and the Grenadines	108,127
Palau	108,127
Zambia	97,868
Qatar	86,282
Jamaica	55,186
Kenya	41,764
Laos	33,967
Brunei	27,325
Myanmar	3,767
Cambodia	3,202
Benin	2,493
Argentina	351

== See also ==
- Modern day shipbuilding
- Shipbuilding countries list
