= List of countries by automotive component exports =

Wikimedia Commons

The following is a list of countries by automotive component exports. The list uses the Harmonised System 8708.

== International Trade Centre ==
Data is for 2024, in thousands of United States dollars and tons.

List of countries by automotive component exports (2024)
Country	Value exported (thousands USD)	Trade balance (thousands USD)	Quantity exported (tons)
World	468,568,814	1,776,710	0
Germany	64,152,998	16,694,877	5,484,424
China	63,730,666	36,156,470	11,140,333
United States	45,309,229	−44,999,570	–
Mexico	41,078,931	6,715,176	0
Japan	26,209,763	17,565,467	2,219,684
South Korea	21,865,110	16,094,272	2,374,043
Poland	18,970,253	6,921,239	2,232,657
Czech Republic	16,506,965	3,442,655	1,849,178
Italy	15,456,885	5,985,497	1,687,713
France	13,835,330	−3,553,180	1,496,797
Canada	13,178,182	−5,609,148	0
Spain	11,183,379	−2,950,969	1,571,422
Hungary	10,988,217	3,191,485	0
Thailand	8,948,721	2,744,253	1,023,687
Romania	7,908,770	1,934,995	564,628
Turkey	7,609,612	333,823	1,378,924
India	7,557,462	765,082	1,334,193
Slovakia	6,865,395	−7,458,292	800,227
Belgium	6,818,115	−1,881,220	765,441
Vietnam	6,520,776	1,087,970	0
United Kingdom	5,480,545	−7,175,766	491,746
Taiwan	5,292,511	3,416,402	393,611
Austria	5,028,866	−580,723	488,213
Sweden	4,808,481	−1,482,081	514,315
Netherlands	4,633,748	−1,738,473	532,885
Portugal	3,530,352	−206,702	441,354
Hong Kong	2,492,393	−34,159	0
Brazil	2,476,247	−5,924,083	339,797
Indonesia	2,172,666	−1,116,329	273,697
Singapore	1,754,661	−61,530	0
Malaysia	1,460,134	−2,650,499	114,094
Morocco	1,459,402	−876,093	0
Slovenia	1,360,347	454,848	150,459
Switzerland	1,152,339	−386,685	94,058
Australia	831,131	−2,171,470	0
Philippines	787,224	379,555	132,512
Tunisia	732,080	457,639	0
Denmark	728,278	−286,109	90,216
South Africa	693,292	−1,151,861	70,640
Serbia	612,041	131,051	43,342
Norway	544,808	−443,129	50,524
Bulgaria	448,672	−17,084	38,563
Lithuania	374,079	−205,965	58,366
Croatia	358,676	−3,516	42,546
Argentina	349,534	−3,362,888	31,678
Saudi Arabia	348,272	−1,460,552	88,932
United Arab Emirates	344,265	−4,006,984	0
Finland	329,950	−1,003,560	28,883
Russia	320,523	−3,338,096	0
Latvia	278,831	−71,961	22,119
Bosnia and Herzegovina	265,920	115,778	25,811
Luxembourg	263,329	−76,212	53,399
Ireland	206,561	−303,730	15,132
North Macedonia	200,318	113,209	12,615
Estonia	198,005	−21,077	20,241
Panama	177,180	−117,523	26,555
Greece	152,505	−459,349	36,035
Chile	134,339	−521,082	8,575
Uzbekistan	104,473	−1,834,142	13,467
Kazakhstan	92,233	−1,041,963	8,986
New Zealand	82,827	−291,646	51,150
Kuwait	61,733	−270,261	5,958
Honduras	53,885	−64,786	1,882
Kyrgyzstan	52,492	−60,359	5,499
Belarus	49,035	−335,758	0
Uruguay	48,819	−341,995	2,057
Israel	46,346	−354,240	3,300
Colombia	46,037	−534,845	5,928
Oman	44,439	−117,061	0
Cambodia	42,804	−27,701	3,949
Ukraine	35,023	−649,003	5,907
Peru	34,437	−394,847	1,979
Moldova	23,530	−68,706	1,402
Pakistan	22,335	−126,185	–
Albania	21,609	−46,288	0
Jordan	20,155	−121,587	0
El Salvador	13,573	−105,409	1,276
Laos	13,387	−41,327	0
Armenia	13,216	−46,631	754
Dominican Republic	12,116	−134,764	5,328
Costa Rica	11,388	−118,455	625
Egypt	9,621	−643,922	689
Iran	8,647	−746,755	0
Guatemala	8,553	−236,625	904
Papua New Guinea	8,066	−108,768	0
Zambia	7,314	−69,556	813
Malta	6,154	−36,315	203
Nigeria	5,672	−593,156	5,783
Bahrain	5,351	−89,841	0
Myanmar	4,488	−21,822	339
Cyprus	4,475	−87,080	831
Georgia	4,471	−68,848	531
Senegal	4,007	−32,067	544
Botswana	3,908	−73,199	482
Namibia	3,794	−85,600	399
Mozambique	3,239	−56,885	0
Sao Tome and Principe	2,925	2,110	0
Kenya	2,893	−106,184	446
Côte d'Ivoire	2,798	−38,588	265
Mongolia	2,519	−139,683	81
Mali	2,337	−16,239	0
Uganda	2,219	−29,553	243
Trinidad and Tobago	1,997	−31,645	261
Sri Lanka	1,836	−71,925	587
United States Minor; Outlying Islands	1,428	−1,534	0
Lebanon	1,369	−108,382	0
Sierra Leone	1,354	−8,752	0
Ecuador	1,344	−270,247	228
Azerbaijan	1,329	−143,483	162
Iceland	1,257	−68,448	56
Central African Republic	1,173	−24,073	104
Togo	1,051	−7,167	161
New Caledonia	1,023	−15,177	0
Burkina Faso	1,019	−19,086	166
Nicaragua	814	−48,341	40
Tanzania	810	−73,940	98
Ethiopia	798	−31,277	37
Qatar	775	−131,697	0
Afghanistan	772	−32,886	0
Guinea	759	−69,220	0
Montenegro	751	−24,119	87
Bangladesh	696	−199,078	0
Somalia	688	−16,442	0
Algeria	629	−614,058	61
Greenland	563	−10,628	343
Belize	548	−8,690	22
Barbados	509	−13,939	28
Ghana	500	−224,718	0
Venezuela	479	−192,483	0
Fiji	469	−21,546	0
Suriname	456	−15,776	76
Jamaica	437	−49,217	0
Faroe Islands	394	−6,747	0
Zimbabwe	351	−38,275	57
British Virgin Islands	312	−1,256	0
Brunei	305	−11,104	64
Eswatini	302	−18,418	0
Bolivia	296	−80,225	75
Mauritius	282	−35,340	0
Bahamas	266	−18,502	0
Lesotho	264	−13,402	107
Tokelau	245	109	14
Cameroon	243	−64,641	0
Syria	238	−11,329	65
North Korea	210	198	0
Angola	209	−48,488	992
Tonga	194	−425	0
Benin	191	−5,155	446
DR Congo	183	−98,428	0
Cocos (Keeling) Islands	177	147	0
Andorra	176	−23,863	0
Burundi	170	−4,214	162
Saint Lucia	168	−4,646	0
Macao	162	−15,460	19
Cook Islands	142	−906	6
Cuba	141	−34,710	0
Guyana	130	−20,910	42
Iraq	120	−577,872	53
Malawi	118	−8,570	157
Curaçao	108	−11,424	0
Marshall Islands	89	−666	10
Montserrat	86	−73	0
Cayman Islands	76	−2,933	0
Nepal	72	−59,044	0
Sint Maarten (Dutch part)	71	−2,132	9
Nauru	64	−873	0
Congo	64	−34,614	2,409
Antigua and Barbuda	58	−2,980	33
Turkmenistan	57	−38,437	0
Saint Vincent and the Grenadines	54	−1,919	0
Djibouti	54	−33,943	33
Gabon	54	−20,841	0
Gibraltar	53	−2,588	0
Sudan	52	−23,721	2
Grenada	51	−4,909	2
Yemen	46	−92,735	0
Aruba	43	−5,026	0
Solomon Islands	42	−9,440	0
Christmas Island	41	−383	3
Rwanda	38	−9,241	0
Norfolk Island	36	−37	0
Anguilla	32	−151	0
Bhutan	31	−5,413	0
Paraguay	30	−136,739	0
Tajikistan	25	−225,925	0
Chad	24	−4,685	0
Equatorial Guinea	20	−7,118	7
Turks and Caicos Islands	20	−2,473	0
Haiti	19	−7,107	0
Saint Helena	18	−1,441	1
Bonaire, Sint Eustatius and Saba	15	−370	1
Dominica	14	−2,054	0
Western Sahara	14	−85	0
Eritrea	13	−4,469	0
Libya	13	−223,613	0
Palestine	12	−14,924	0
Kiribati	11	−511	0
South Sudan	11	−1,902	0
Madagascar	8	−15,150	2
British Indian Ocean Territory	8	−367	0
Bermuda	7	−4,333	1
Comoros	7	−1,093	0
Timor-Leste	7	−7,982	0
Guinea-Bissau	6	−728	1
Niger	6	−2,127	0
French Southern and Antarctic Territories	5	−1,324	0
Pitcairn	5	3	0
Palau	5	−662	0
Seychelles	5	−13,355	3
Saint Kitts and Nevis	4	−1,400	0
Saint Pierre and Miquelon	4	−810	0
Northern Mariana Islands	4	−437	0
Niue	3	−25	0
Tuvalu	3	−51	0
Liberia	3	−13,940	0
Mauritania	2	−33,031	5
British Antarctic Territory	2	2	1
Falkland Islands	1	−1,563	0
Vanuatu	1	−4,630	0
Wallis and Futuna	1	−55	0

== Observatory of Economic Complexity ==
Data is for 2023, in United States dollars.

List of countries by automotive component exports (2023)
Country	Trade value
Germany	68,953,848,555
China	51,822,494,966
United States	41,659,292,481
Mexico	41,226,961,400
Japan	29,094,742,896
Poland	19,912,168,956
South Korea	16,852,045,150
Italy	16,438,293,181
France	16,437,451,653
Czechia	16,341,763,877
Canada	13,340,386,962
Spain	12,953,205,677
Hungary	9,812,165,483
Thailand	8,414,364,039
Romania	8,050,180,563
Slovakia	7,511,120,551
Turkey	7,388,668,025
India	7,364,178,301
Belgium	6,331,656,487
Austria	5,834,126,776
Sweden	5,719,520,932
United Kingdom	5,533,219,982
Netherlands	4,657,087,503
Taiwan	4,182,347,387
Portugal	3,566,153,525
Brazil	2,993,135,275
Vietnam	2,032,458,734
Indonesia	2,011,949,952
United Arab Emirates	1,855,821,078
Slovenia	1,534,965,006
Morocco	1,376,146,426
Switzerland	1,156,975,408
Denmark	995,212,599
Malaysia	842,197,927
Serbia	819,847,484
South Africa	713,382,335
Norway	624,812,790
Tunisia	619,538,130
Australia	600,328,777
Philippines	567,844,184
Singapore	512,903,926
Argentina	484,092,225
Bulgaria	470,825,118
Finland	427,330,011
Lithuania	420,431,944
Croatia	373,736,799
Luxembourg	351,128,909
Estonia	320,936,896
Latvia	320,744,659
Russia	307,135,867
North Macedonia	284,960,740
Ireland	262,476,554
Bosnia and Herzegovina	236,532,424
Oman	225,668,806
Hong Kong	164,209,988
Chile	135,794,682
Greece	128,620,577
Kazakhstan	105,123,352
Bahrain	103,362,162
Israel	80,636,383
New Zealand	72,779,951
Honduras	56,755,564
Uzbekistan	54,876,903
Uruguay	53,793,295
Colombia	51,757,567
Kyrgyzstan	46,919,091
Belarus	45,366,802
Ukraine	44,163,868
Cambodia	41,710,849
Dominican Republic	38,563,641
Malta	34,928,315
Sri Lanka	29,499,687
Peru	29,366,698
Saudi Arabia	28,406,287
Jordan	26,277,934
Moldova	25,142,413
Kuwait	23,602,772
Costa Rica	20,450,625
Albania	19,499,906
Egypt	18,759,802
Pakistan	18,690,724
Armenia	18,428,388
Nigeria	13,208,909
El Salvador	12,467,799
Iran	10,646,933
Panama	10,410,914
Georgia	9,513,739
Guatemala	8,176,777
Cyprus	7,705,817
Zambia	6,215,109
Qatar	5,903,972
Myanmar	5,821,037
Curacao	5,174,862
Cote d'Ivoire	4,787,946
Sao Tome and Principe	4,695,037
Botswana	3,874,986
Burkina Faso	3,536,607
Macau	3,518,509
Kenya	3,449,707
Laos	3,351,218
Paraguay	3,251,131
Papua New Guinea	3,240,481
Mauritius	3,179,144
Namibia	2,960,179
Tanzania	2,454,029
Ecuador	2,378,246
New Caledonia	2,227,982
Lesotho	2,019,006
Mozambique	1,927,555
Suriname	1,821,602
Sierra Leone	1,710,416
Brunei	1,645,561
Senegal	1,500,275
Lebanon	1,469,309
Mali	1,450,939
Bahamas	1,401,677
Andorra	1,374,460
Algeria	1,297,590
Greenland	1,221,282
Iceland	1,107,306
Jamaica	980,146
Eswatini	934,904
Cocos (Keeling) Islands	903,589
Azerbaijan	841,418
Nicaragua	809,366
Uganda	802,929
Ghana	747,962
Zimbabwe	743,634
Guinea	641,159
Montenegro	603,046
American Samoa	587,592
Syria	572,462
Mongolia	507,170
Bangladesh	503,258
Bolivia	419,098
Cameroon	418,009
Benin	410,974
Afghanistan	381,261
Marshall Islands	373,247
Belize	346,387
Cuba	316,879
Aruba	294,671
Trinidad and Tobago	294,526
Fiji	291,189
Barbados	268,629
Micronesia	268,611
Mauritania	249,639
Venezuela	237,314
Angola	216,742
Republic of the Congo	194,910
Ethiopia	189,784
Tonga	189,084
Madagascar	179,735
Gibraltar	177,884
Norfolk Island	174,547
Iraq	158,371
Tokelau	149,791
British Virgin Islands	147,588
Somalia	133,685
Djibouti	130,703
Seychelles	115,388
Nepal	111,903
Turks and Caicos Islands	109,980
Gabon	107,818
San Marino	106,025
Rwanda	97,483
North Korea	92,263
Togo	91,877
Yemen	82,934
Anguilla	81,986
Niger	80,208
French Polynesia	80,133
Nauru	78,549
Sudan	66,012
Malawi	65,563
Vanuatu	62,583
Bermuda	62,392
Turkmenistan	62,017
Equatorial Guinea	57,053
Saint Vincent and the Grenadines	53,884
DR Congo	52,247
Liberia	48,696
Antigua and Barbuda	44,580
Guyana	39,678
Haiti	38,553
Falkland Islands	38,538
Gambia	34,605
Samoa	33,991
Cayman Islands	31,504
Saint Helena	30,852
Saint Martin	23,197
Saint Lucia	22,990
Saint Pierre and Miquelon	19,198
Maldives	17,127
Kiribati	15,949
Cook Islands	14,932
Dominica	12,686
Christmas Island	12,319
Central African Republic	11,160
Timor-Leste	11,014
Saint Kitts and Nevis	9,970
Cape Verde	9,884
South Sudan	9,105
Eritrea	7,861
Grenada	7,528
Niue	7,081
Comoros	5,756
Montserrat	4,935
Saint Barthelemy	4,894
Guam	4,789
Solomon Islands	4,440
Tajikistan	4,181
Palestine	3,675
Libya	3,451
Guinea-Bissau	2,919
Bhutan	2,913
Bonaire	2,494
Pitcairn Islands	2,435
Chad	2,019
Burundi	1,543
Northern Mariana Islands	1,275
French South Antarctic Territory	1,225
Palau	830
Wallis and Futuna	644
Tuvalu	631
British Indian Ocean Territory	497
