= List of countries by aircraft component exports =

The following is a list of countries by exports of aircraft components.

== International Trade Centre ==
Data is for 2024, in thousands of United States dollars and tons.

List of countries by aircraft component exports (2024)
Country	Value exported (thousands USD)	Trade balance (thousands USD)	Quantity exported (tons)
World	83,886,607	−10,183,955	0
United Kingdom	13,908,417	7,092,116	38,008
Germany	9,977,744	1,617,099	26,594
France	9,370,162	−2,655,113	21,130
United States	7,319,570	−9,516,845	0
Singapore	5,240,794	−639,476	5,075
China	3,518,530	−1,033,529	35,287
Canada	3,179,702	−2,325,281	0
Spain	2,738,034	211,767	9,292
Japan	2,081,743	−18,103	4,670
Hong Kong	2,051,650	−366,940	0
South Korea	1,980,616	794,758	7,208
Netherlands	1,485,568	517,446	2,290
India	1,390,680	456,690	0
Austria	1,303,164	872,117	5,930
Australia	1,228,718	58,555	0
Vietnam	1,172,802	285,671	0
Malaysia	1,158,925	−899,711	0
Poland	964,004	480,986	2,497
Belgium	955,289	417,330	2,391
Israel	876,137	490,279	0
Turkey	708,680	−12,714	3,069
Mexico	707,474	487,879	0
Taiwan	652,917	−947,340	5,583
Saudi Arabia	614,394	−938,721	1,357
Philippines	600,141	243,567	1,363
Morocco	593,929	96,659	0
Brazil	588,674	−969,908	838
Thailand	576,306	380	0
Ireland	549,270	−249,774	1,514
Romania	510,377	313,965	3,191
Switzerland	476,377	−621,664	1,101
Chile	375,293	361,198	455
Portugal	365,406	164,192	1,997
Italy	364,502	−120,390	1,045
Indonesia	332,701	9,959	2,135
Denmark	321,593	−43,781	752
Czech Republic	308,761	156,853	1,047
Sweden	305,886	153,523	0
United Arab Emirates	295,145	−752,679	0
Norway	289,881	−205,437	758
Russia	273,162	−18,563	0
Tunisia	262,234	102,630	0
South Africa	214,668	−110,877	615,318
Hungary	197,278	14,714	0
Bulgaria	128,927	−35,017	369
Luxembourg	123,509	17,551	646
Greece	111,082	−117,723	162
Croatia	102,525	−57,417	295
Central African Republic	102,317	100,013	52
Ecuador	74,244	67,514	183
New Zealand	65,703	−178,594	155
Ethiopia	60,226	−14,355	0
Lithuania	60,204	−12,141	335
Malta	54,454	−17,519	130
Finland	43,458	−164,777	71
Slovenia	40,251	−16,832	93
Latvia	38,418	−39,466	50
Brunei	33,627	−13,689	13
Estonia	28,986	3,490	98
Bermuda	27,813	27,785	16
Uganda	25,766	−40,176	249
Fiji	24,209	−40,459	43
Dominican Republic	23,363	−1,629	33
Colombia	22,197	−135,503	42
Ukraine	20,815	−116,357	31
Albania	20,669	−6,098	14
Guyana	20,328	−3,848	9
Montenegro	19,831	18,313	75
Costa Rica	19,594	14,705	73
Jordan	12,987	−126,596	31
Slovakia	12,705	−7,857	372
Mongolia	11,309	−1,296	21
Kazakhstan	10,791	−47,481	48
Serbia	9,086	−32,272	136
Georgia	7,571	−5,376	94
Qatar	7,535	−304,559	0
Trinidad and Tobago	7,403	−21,434	38
Sri Lanka	6,389	−24,442	29
Senegal	6,160	4,050	60
Pakistan	5,646	−33,724	2
Nepal	5,335	−13,087	0
Burkina Faso	5,257	−5,558	28
Barbados	4,733	2,846	11
North Macedonia	4,708	4,175	35
Iraq	4,641	−37,267	0
Togo	4,306	2,089	5
Mauritius	4,283	−11,682	64
Uzbekistan	3,547	−928	0
Oman	3,310	−63,323	0
Bosnia and Herzegovina	3,269	2,367	36
Bahrain	3,172	−220,285	0
French Polynesia	3,143	−3,541	10
Laos	2,980	−1,929	0
Tanzania	2,771	−26,898	16
Iceland	2,698	−53,604	33
Nigeria	2,452	−32,537	0
Côte d'Ivoire	2,344	−2,059	31
Bolivia	2,278	−941	1
Belarus	2,075	−398	0
Seychelles	2,063	−7,750	23
Cyprus	1,884	−7,336	24
Peru	1,690	−15,199	11
Angola	1,645	−20,670	13
Bahamas	1,640	−6,462	37
Kenya	1,581	−91,857	37
Suriname	1,561	753	18
Bhutan	1,495	280	2
Papua New Guinea	1,341	−47,040	0
Botswana	1,299	−17,499	14
Zimbabwe	1,231	−9,053	6
Namibia	1,230	−20,163	16
Kyrgyzstan	1,105	−4,125	34
Algeria	1,063	−55,946	8
Macao	1,052	−19,814	2
Zambia	964	−6,827	8
United States Minor Outlying Islands	933	−2,793	0
Nicaragua	920	−364	3
New Caledonia	863	−5,852	0
Eswatini	739	194	0
Gabon	727	−6,423	0
Falkland Islands	726	−8,143	3
Kuwait	619	−654,828	3
Bangladesh	576	−50,017	0
Cambodia	531	−7,130	2
Djibouti	482	−3,708	0
Micronesia	460	−9	1
Niger	446	−3,621	2
Moldova	446	−3,136	25
Cameroon	411	−1,694	0
Panama	384	−5,376	18
DR Congo	367	−10,056	0
Sao Tome and Principe	319	317	0
Curaçao	259	−6,506	0
Guinea	234	−952	0
Ghana	226	−9,961	0
Venezuela	225	−2,131	7
Egypt	215	−1,637	0
Armenia	215	−2,812	13
Rwanda	185	−2,220	0
French Southern and Antarctic Territories	184	−1,220	0
Mali	171	−1,665	0
Belize	167	−1,632	2
Sierra Leone	156	86	0
Greenland	144	−11,663	2
Mauritania	133	−352	1
Mozambique	130	−2,036	0
Faroe Islands	118	−1,128	9
Benin	115	−648	72
Tajikistan	104	−10,925	0
Iran	98	−9,321	0
Cayman Islands	93	25	0
Aruba	92	−16	0
Chad	90	−2,748	0
Bonaire, Sint Eustatius and Saba	84	80	1
Vanuatu	82	−722	0
Marshall Islands	79	−1,573	0
Nauru	74	69	0
Sudan	61	−1,154	0
Libya	47	−4,554	5
Lebanon	45	−8,279	0
Grenada	44	−11	0
British Virgin Islands	43	−313	0
Andorra	43	−270	0
Haiti	41	7	0
Honduras	41	−1,531	1
Comoros	39	−503	0
Malawi	37	−405	7
Anguilla	37	−151	0
Cuba	36	−1,391	1
Madagascar	31	−1,537	4
Saint Lucia	23	−113	0
Wallis and Futuna Islands	23	−221	0
Eritrea	22	22	0
Uruguay	20	−493	1
Afghanistan	19	−612	0
Solomon Islands	18	−2,061	0
Myanmar	18	−18,964	0
El Salvador	18	−980	0
Congo	18	−826	0
Antigua and Barbuda	15	−1,421	0
Somalia	15	−2,686	0
Turkmenistan	12	−6,429	0
Montserrat	12	12	0
Liberia	9	−111	0
Cook Islands	9	−469	0
Turks and Caicos Islands	9	−12	0
South Sudan	8	−299	0
Saint Vincent and the Grenadines	8	−556	0
Sint Maarten (Dutch part)	8	−73	0
Lesotho	7	−19	0
Paraguay	6	−2,142	0
Cocos (Keeling) Islands	4	−37	0
Tonga	3	−421	0
Guatemala	2	−21	0
Kiribati	2	−589	0
Jamaica	2	−424	0
North Korea	1	1	0
Northern Mariana Islands	1	1	0
Burundi	1	−45	0
Azerbaijan	1	−110	0
Saint Helena	1	−1	0
Timor-Leste	1	−1,586	0
Samoa	1	−368	0
Yemen	1	−1,536	0

== Observatory of Economic Complexity ==
Data is for 2023, in United States dollars.

List of countries by aircraft component exports (2023)
Country	Trade value	Share (%)
United States	25,870,929,040	29.792
France	10,646,742,345	12.260
United Kingdom	10,491,044,547	12.081
Germany	8,355,664,187	9.622
Canada	2,922,262,975	3.365
Italy	2,482,848,050	2.859
Japan	2,336,913,443	2.691
China	2,319,798,285	2.671
Mexico	2,195,435,666	2.528
Spain	1,729,764,802	1.992
Morocco	1,233,707,712	1.421
South Korea	1,211,731,904	1.395
Singapore	1,210,545,802	1.394
Austria	986,666,878	1.136
Netherlands	956,224,192	1.101
Malaysia	862,005,767	0.993
India	808,769,379	0.931
Belgium	766,678,203	0.883
Turkey	729,376,354	0.840
Australia	618,091,439	0.712
Poland	577,198,412	0.665
Israel	555,729,621	0.640
United Arab Emirates	534,509,445	0.616
Brazil	457,082,653	0.526
Switzerland	431,723,393	0.497
Thailand	402,672,228	0.464
Russia	384,239,776	0.442
Portugal	355,459,357	0.409
Czechia	339,228,756	0.391
Romania	318,019,209	0.366
Taiwan	311,304,899	0.358
Sweden	295,877,836	0.341
Tunisia	248,011,673	0.286
Philippines	227,775,591	0.262
Denmark	221,201,847	0.255
Norway	174,349,882	0.201
Hungary	156,193,075	0.180
Hong Kong	153,331,376	0.177
Vietnam	148,564,745	0.171
Oman	139,959,352	0.161
Saudi Arabia	113,521,219	0.131
Ireland	103,617,956	0.119
South Africa	99,884,483	0.115
Slovakia	90,642,103	0.104
Lithuania	89,942,813	0.104
Indonesia	85,981,605	0.099
Ethiopia	85,234,510	0.098
Luxembourg	76,707,571	0.088
Qatar	74,789,016	0.086
Croatia	66,399,130	0.076
Latvia	56,411,654	0.065
Jordan	55,442,261	0.064
Sri Lanka	45,349,528	0.052
Bahrain	44,617,912	0.051
Bulgaria	44,260,535	0.051
Greece	42,562,346	0.049
New Zealand	36,705,720	0.042
Slovenia	32,431,762	0.037
Colombia	30,185,286	0.035
Uganda	28,313,459	0.033
Ecuador	23,595,244	0.027
Brunei	23,531,254	0.027
Finland	23,361,335	0.027
Ukraine	22,553,739	0.026
Estonia	19,511,658	0.022
Malta	16,175,112	0.019
French Polynesia	13,160,071	0.015
Kazakhstan	11,531,124	0.013
Kuwait	11,454,767	0.013
Serbia	10,817,930	0.012
Chile	9,024,468	0.010
Montenegro	8,597,677	0.010
Pakistan	8,309,716	0.010
Costa Rica	7,867,862	0.009
Macau	7,686,114	0.009
Guyana	7,621,136	0.009
Papua New Guinea	7,040,118	0.008
Kyrgyzstan	6,539,600	0.008
Egypt	6,111,506	0.007
Kenya	5,390,558	0.006
Argentina	5,315,940	0.006
Iraq	4,896,381	0.006
Georgia	4,881,003	0.006
Uzbekistan	4,801,959	0.006
Albania	4,769,535	0.005
Togo	4,650,343	0.005
Djibouti	4,630,849	0.005
Algeria	3,973,630	0.005
Tanzania	3,951,754	0.005
Iceland	3,796,764	0.004
Senegal	3,783,263	0.004
Peru	3,656,830	0.004
Dominican Republic	3,486,338	0.004
Cyprus	2,874,728	0.003
Burkina Faso	2,866,347	0.003
Mauritius	2,539,239	0.003
North Macedonia	2,518,696	0.003
Niger	2,383,552	0.003
Gabon	2,370,711	0.003
Fiji	2,300,649	0.003
Lebanon	2,024,729	0.002
Sao Tome and Principe	1,927,492	0.002
Seychelles	1,917,627	0.002
Suriname	1,730,052	0.002
Bosnia and Herzegovina	1,728,374	0.002
Panama	1,615,360	0.002
Zimbabwe	1,497,981	0.002
Mozambique	1,444,119	0.002
El Salvador	1,299,729	0.001
Nepal	1,276,811	0.001
Yemen	1,240,130	0.001
DR Congo	1,232,462	0.001
Nigeria	1,208,104	0.001
Moldova	1,198,152	0.001
Belarus	1,180,227	0.001
Mali	1,128,472	0.001
Barbados	1,098,750	0.001
Eswatini	1,008,025	0.001
Angola	1,007,109	0.001
Ghana	1,004,425	0.001
Armenia	914,774	0.001
Paraguay	911,342	0.001
Cayman Islands	867,067	0.001
Botswana	840,285	0.001
Maldives	639,041	0.001
Azerbaijan	626,906	0.001
Curacao	625,233	0.001
New Caledonia	583,638	0.001
Bhutan	567,284	0.001
Nicaragua	520,063	0.001
Greenland	507,169	0.001
Myanmar	487,766	0.001
Uruguay	469,846	0.001
Cote d'Ivoire	467,711	0.001
Bangladesh	456,068	0.001
Afghanistan	436,169	0.001
Falkland Islands	435,851	0.001
Zambia	414,819	0.001
Venezuela	361,248	0.001
Laos	332,934	0.001
Andorra	327,104	0.001
Cape Verde	251,686	0.001
Madagascar	251,498	0.001
Grenada	242,150	0.001
Namibia	214,687	0.001
Sudan	202,434	0.000
Guam	171,756	0.000
Solomon Islands	170,404	0.000
Timor-Leste	168,980	0.000
Cambodia	157,595	0.000
Gambia	150,689	0.000
Antigua and Barbuda	146,323	0.000
Turkmenistan	144,054	0.000
Marshall Islands	141,055	0.000
American Samoa	129,234	0.000
Bahamas	129,102	0.000
Tajikistan	126,095	0.000
Iran	121,801	0.000
Cameroon	118,338	0.000
Belize	105,036	0.000
Aruba	97,749	0.000
Dominica	94,159	0.000
Vanuatu	92,778	0.000
Sierra Leone	92,052	0.000
Micronesia	89,109	0.000
Mongolia	83,010	0.000
Palestine	82,492	0.000
Mauritania	73,420	0.000
Chad	69,967	0.000
Rwanda	69,042	0.000
Somalia	68,586	0.000
Jamaica	65,032	0.000
Cuba	62,663	0.000
Libya	59,850	0.000
Anguilla	58,860	0.000
Guinea	48,699	0.000
Guatemala	42,601	0.000
Central African Republic	42,198	0.000
Saint Lucia	36,409	0.000
Saint Martin	35,437	0.000
Malawi	33,073	0.000
Bolivia	31,770	0.000
Saint Pierre and Miquelon	31,364	0.000
Congo	31,140	0.000
South Sudan	31,043	0.000
Honduras	27,296	0.000
Saint Vincent and the Grenadines	18,102	0.000
Trinidad and Tobago	16,340	0.000
Haiti	16,210	0.000
British Virgin Islands	14,769	0.000
Equatorial Guinea	12,557	0.000
Lesotho	10,793	0.000
Tonga	9,283	0.000
Benin	6,968	0.000
French South Antarctic Territory	6,261	0.000
Saint Kitts and Nevis	4,502	0.000
Comoros	3,192	0.000
Saint Helena	2,996	0.000
Eritrea	1,549	0.000
Bonaire	1,319	0.000
Bermuda	1,207	0.000
Samoa	881	0.000
British Indian Ocean Territory	416	0.000
Nauru	200	0.000
Tokelau	74	0.000
