= List of countries by palladium production =

This is a list of countries by palladium production in kilograms, based upon data from the United States Geological Survey.

== Current data ==
* indicates "Natural resources of COUNTRY or TERRITORY" links.

Palladium production in kilograms
Country	2024	2022
World	190,000	203,328
Russia *	75,000	86,779
South Africa *	72,000	73,104
Canada *	15,000	16,565
Zimbabwe	15,000	13,935
United States	8,000	10,096
China	–	1,300
Finland	–	960
Australia	–	392
Serbia	–	100
Uzbekistan	–	93
Poland	–	4
Others	4,200	–

== Historical data ==
=== 2010s ===
In 2019, the world production of palladium totaled 210,000 kilograms—down 5% from 220,000 kg in 2018.

Country	2010	2011	2012	2013	2014	2015	2016	2017	2018	2019
World	202,000	215,000	201,000	203,000	193,000	208,000	210,000	210,000	220,000	210,000
Russia *	84,700	86,000	82,000	80,000	83,000	80,000	79,400	81,000	90,000	86,000
South Africa *	82,200	82,000	74,000	75,000	58,400	73,000	76,300	78,000	80,600	80,000
Canada *	6,700	14,000	12,200	16,500	20,000	24,000	21,000	19,000	20,000	20,000
United States	11,600	12,400	12,300	12,600	12,400	12,500	13,100	13,000	14,300	12,000
Zimbabwe	7,000	8,200	9,000	9,600	10,100	10,000	12,000	12,000	12,000	12,000
Others	9,540	12,200	11,500	8,900	9,000	8,000	8,200	8,400	2,920	3,000

=== 2000s ===
Country	2000	2001	2002	2003	2004	2005	2006	2007	2008	2009
World	174,000	179,000	181,000	182,000	188,000	219,000	224,000	219,000	204,000	192,000
Russia *	94,000	90,000	84,000	74,000	74,000	97,400	98,400	96,800	87,700	83,200
South Africa *	55,900	61,000	64,000	72,800	78,500	84,900	85,000	86,500	75,500	75,100
United States	10,300	12,100	14,800	14,000	13,700	13,300	14,400	12,800	11,900	12,700
Canada *	8,600	8,800	11,500	11,500	12,000	13,000	14,000	10,500	15,000	6,500
Zimbabwe	—	—	—	—	—	—	4,000	4,200	4,390	5,680
Others	5,360	7,400	6,900	9,700	9,900	9,900	8,210	8,120	9,500	9,230

=== 1990s ===
Country	1994	1995	1996	1997	1998	1999
World	99,200	112,000	111,000	119,000	123,000	174,000
Russia *	40,000	48,000	48,000	47,000	47,000	85,000
South Africa *	44,000	49,400	48,900	55,900	57,300	63,600
United States	6,440	5,260	6,100	8,400	10,600	9,800
Canada *	7,000	7,100	5,270	4,810	4,810	8,592
Others	1,800	2,200	2,730	2,890	2,930	7,000
