= List of countries by bentonite production =

This is a list of countries by bentonite production. Bentonite is an absorbent aluminium phyllosilicate generally impure clay consisting mostly of montmorillonite. There are a few types of bentonites and their names depend on the dominant elements, such as potassium, sodium, calcium, and aluminium. As noted in several places in the geologic literature, there are some nomenclatorial problems with the classification of bentonite clays.

Bentonite usually forms from weathering of volcanic ash, most often in the presence of water. However, the term bentonite, as well as a similar clay called tonstein, have been used for clay beds of uncertain origin. For industrial purposes, two main classes of bentonite exist: sodium bentonite and calcium bentonite.

In stratigraphy and tephrochronology, completely devitrified (weathered volcanic glass) ash-fall beds are commonly referred to as K-bentonites when the dominant clay species is illite. Other common clay species, and sometimes dominant, are montmorillonite and kaolinite. Kaolinite dominated clays are commonly referred to as tonsteins and are typically associated with coal.

== List ==
* indicates "Natural resources of COUNTRY or TERRITORY" links.

Bentonite production by country in 2022
Country	Production (metric tonnes)
World	15,135,176
United States	4,500,000
India *	3,500,000
China *	2,100,000
Turkey *	2,018,993
Greece	1,250,000
Iran *	1,100,000
Bulgaria	750,248
Japan	420,000
South Korea *	341,335
Germany	316,000
Slovakia	302,000
Brazil *	220,000
Spain	186,363
France	176,628
Azerbaijan *	175,875
Czech Republic	167,000
Morocco	135,600
Mozambique *	113,985
Italy *	102,264
South Africa *	97,019
Ukraine *	90,000
Cyprus	86,562
Romania *	61,165
Russia *	50,000
Uzbekistan *	50,000
Argentina *	46,000
Hungary *	34,690
Algeria	32,000
Pakistan *	28,454
Bosnia and Herzegovina *	28,173
Denmark *	24,128
Georgia	22,955
Peru *	22,931
Australia	22,000
Uruguay	21,570
Armenia *	13,198
Colombia *	9,000
Iraq	6,300
Indonesia *	6,000
Egypt *	3,000
Chile	1,372
New Zealand	750
Philippines *	650
Burma *	500
Cuba	290
Kenya	110
Slovenia	68
