= List of countries by raw cotton exports =

The following is a list of countries by raw cotton exports, using the Harmonised System code 5201.

== International Trade Centre ==
Data is for 2024, in thousands of United States dollars and tons.

List of countries by raw cotton exports (2024)
Country	Value exported (thousands USD)	Trade balance (thousands USD)	Quantity exported (tons)
World	17,357,728	872,384	9,020,451
Brazil	5,154,943	5,150,527	2,774,346
United States	5,007,819	5,005,527	2,491,893
Australia	2,520,662	2,520,627	1,225,329
India	918,281	−86,397	464,999
Benin	500,888	496,299	259,466
Turkey	478,060	−1,046,853	253,004
Greece	465,951	461,381	254,348
Burkina Faso	332,854	332,828	176,103
Côte d'Ivoire	274,626	274,523	147,363
Afghanistan	226,301	226,301	111,111
Azerbaijan	177,120	177,101	118,515
Egypt	153,034	−118,193	77,003
Kazakhstan	149,150	148,972	94,665
Argentina	140,722	140,427	129,758
Sudan	93,874	93,873	49,176
Mali	62,674	62,542	33,523
Tanzania	61,916	61,857	48,313
Spain	57,627	47,844	0
Syria	51,892	51,842	34,165
Tajikistan	51,860	51,837	28,268
Togo	51,860	51,859	28,720
Paraguay	48,553	48,547	30,737
China	47,656	−5,270,320	21,141
Israel	37,057	29,721	18,646
Cameroon	36,423	36,423	18,655
Kyrgyzstan	19,511	19,510	11,173
South Africa	18,353	17,433	11,137
Mexico	17,858	−158,909	9,995
Zimbabwe	15,636	13,634	10,370
Zambia	14,576	14,493	8,830
Chad	13,976	13,976	7,315
Myanmar	13,637	13,339	6,166
Malaysia	12,827	−289,049	7,008
Turkmenistan	11,612	−8,334	8,127
Uganda	11,287	11,282	6,369
Senegal	10,819	10,797	5,571
Italy	10,038	−41,551	0
Mozambique	10,029	9,267	5,880
Mauritania	9,925	9,921	8,497
Portugal	7,316	−51,215	0
Nigeria	6,967	6,799	4,872
Germany	5,892	−29,370	1,545
Indonesia	5,845	−805,438	3,402
United Kingdom	4,288	504	140
Pakistan	3,307	−741,124	1,841
France	3,076	−30,010	959
Madagascar	2,838	2,835	2,167
Taiwan	2,246	−41,369	988
Netherlands	2,171	1,115	0
Malawi	2,035	1,995	549
Jamaica	1,991	1,972	675
Guinea	1,904	1,903	1,001
Ethiopia	1,852	1,852	1,170
South Korea	1,529	−134,995	876
Denmark	1,152	20	0
Hungary	1,144	161	245
Guatemala	982	−117,194	377
Peru	910	−92,096	242
Belgium	816	−4,175	667
Vietnam	778	−2,466,100	353
Ireland	739	400	68
Poland	724	−12,773	299
Thailand	577	−188,038	196
Singapore	409	24	68
Sweden	390	284	182
Switzerland	380	142	59
Iran	380	−34,712	214
Eswatini	355	281	202
Uzbekistan	301	277	114
Bangladesh	287	−2,553,331	294
Bosnia and Herzegovina	230	−3,142	43
Iraq	217	165	161
Slovakia	205	−700	3
Romania	198	−182	45
El Salvador	142	−92,661	60
Mauritius	125	−35,532	63
Norway	121	−181	4
Tokelau	98	−401	43
Slovenia	94	−2,611	20
Morocco	87	−7,261	64
Bulgaria	69	−4,652	7
Barbados	67	65	5
United Arab Emirates	65	−22,559	28
Saudi Arabia	53	−1,747	143
Namibia	50	−90	2
Philippines	49	−6,245	34
Oman	45	14	0
Austria	38	−68	9
Kenya	30	−1,828	6
Latvia	29	−1,969	12
Hong Kong	27	14	21
Nepal	23	−1,009	6
Japan	22	−64,238	0
Congo	19	18	0
Czech Republic	16	−2,925	3
Lesotho	16	−25,774	40
Panama	14	2	3
Trinidad and Tobago	14	13	0
Bahrain	13	−7,679	3
Canada	12	−1,112	4
Ghana	9	−61	1
Gambia	6	−57	6
Guyana	6	−11	0
Serbia	6	−1,623	12
Finland	5	−29	0
Jordan	5	−714	0
Lebanon	5	1	0
Lithuania	5	−7	0
Croatia	5	−272	13
Sri Lanka	4	−210	1
Samoa	4	−58	0
New Zealand	3	−15	0
Fiji	3	0	0
Colombia	2	−10,397	0
Qatar	2	−52	0
Tunisia	2	−3,861	0
Ukraine	1	−902	1
Costa Rica	1	−34,334	135
Greenland	1	−142	0
Angola	1	−274	0

== Observatory of Economic Complexity ==
Data is for 2023, in United States dollars.

List of countries by raw cotton exports (2023)
Country	Trade value
United States	6,003,369,033
Brazil	3,074,138,579
Australia	2,811,045,476
India	758,883,922
Turkey	586,394,451
Benin	503,512,141
Greece	464,391,527
Burkina Faso	262,056,156
Sudan	246,492,059
Egypt	228,156,251
Cote d'Ivoire	203,746,762
Mexico	142,632,914
Kazakhstan	141,451,588
Afghanistan	135,051,803
Azerbaijan	122,748,993
Tanzania	102,066,153
Tajikistan	91,805,986
Argentina	68,757,519
Pakistan	67,934,557
Spain	63,222,518
Sri Lanka	59,866,026
Mali	54,271,028
Syria	48,641,073
Israel	42,837,625
Kyrgyzstan	42,156,840
Cameroon	37,437,261
Zambia	30,800,283
Paraguay	29,560,672
Zimbabwe	26,116,089
Myanmar	24,624,044
Mozambique	21,544,847
China	17,928,262
Malaysia	15,525,471
Nigeria	14,476,085
Senegal	14,247,201
Uganda	13,107,824
Chad	11,940,829
Germany	10,857,918
Italy	8,724,791
South Africa	8,543,799
Peru	7,908,091
Indonesia	7,844,835
Togo	7,555,731
Malawi	7,056,886
Turkmenistan	5,856,970
France	4,990,185
Portugal	4,422,977
Madagascar	3,367,649
Netherlands	3,176,277
Ethiopia	2,177,150
Japan	2,063,059
Hungary	1,845,702
Belgium	1,697,955
Austria	1,581,891
Central African Republic	1,366,401
Jamaica	1,339,675
Switzerland	1,250,217
Thailand	1,028,359
Czech Republic	835,207
United Arab Emirates	746,620
Kenya	734,716
Bulgaria	491,940
Morocco	475,039
Vietnam	474,965
Slovakia	463,092
Uzbekistan	436,477
El Salvador	389,861
United Kingdom	385,076
Bangladesh	381,060
Jordan	319,148
Eswatini	291,855
Cyprus	247,549
Saudi Arabia	242,502
Latvia	235,639
Bosnia and Herzegovina	229,959
Russia	222,168
Philippines	197,901
Estonia	187,364
Barbados	172,581
Poland	157,123
Sweden	148,461
Tunisia	142,757
Guatemala	136,081
Canada	94,217
Singapore	79,396
Romania	70,094
Iran	63,902
Colombia	56,411
Denmark	50,223
Lithuania	47,090
Taiwan	45,785
South Korea	44,304
Hong Kong	42,699
Ghana	41,842
Norway	39,439
South Sudan	36,907
Iraq	24,165
Mauritius	19,352
Namibia	13,985
Finland	11,615
Croatia	10,538
Chile	7,733
Costa Rica	6,995
Lesotho	6,437
Nepal	5,652
Ireland	5,468
Nicaragua	5,223
Serbia	5,050
Trinidad and Tobago	2,932
Angola	2,703
Panama	2,339
New Zealand	1,788
Armenia	1,477
Ukraine	821
Slovenia	631
Luxembourg	630
Greenland	353
Malta	234
Bolivia	155
Guinea	125
Gambia	92
Cambodia	85
Uruguay	57
Botswana	51
North Macedonia	48
Andorra	18
Qatar	17
Bahrain	4
Dominican Republic	2
Haiti	2
