= List of countries by computer exports =

The following is a list of countries by computer exports. The list uses the Harmonised System 8471.

== International Trade Centre ==
Data is for 2024, in thousands of United States dollars and tons/units.

List of countries by computer exports (2024)
Country	Value exported (thousands USD)	Trade balance (thousands USD)	Quantity exported	
Country	Value exported (thousands USD)	Trade balance (thousands USD)	Value	Units
World	532,498,934	−14,121,591	–	–
China	160,696,314	104,185,998	881,696	Tons
Taiwan	84,544,339	71,613,069	416,509	Tons
United States	40,111,786	−101,295,739	88,979,049	Units
Hong Kong	36,532,584	4,238,571	154,890,566	Units
Mexico	34,613,186	21,265,560	–	–
Vietnam	33,693,797	31,242,424	–	–
Singapore	18,666,735	−1,103,296	–	–
Netherlands	16,510,934	−4,358,671	160,446	Tons
Germany	15,623,920	−12,859,397	62,085	Tons
Czech Republic	15,010,756	5,311,464	54,232	Tons
Thailand	14,977,444	6,604,720	–	–
Malaysia	10,903,511	659,495	21,705,713	Units
Poland	7,602,111	1,780,997	35,756	Tons
Hungary	6,806,223	3,682,333	–	–
United Kingdom	4,290,929	−11,831,435	26,562	Tons
Ireland	4,206,194	−904,272	14,285	Tons
France	2,525,395	−8,164,164	13,815	Tons
Belgium	2,239,210	−2,722,572	38,961	Tons
Italy	2,127,990	−4,175,477	9,835	Tons
Sweden	1,965,899	−3,722,997	10,706	Tons
Philippines	1,846,309	667,361	8,796	Tons
Canada	1,615,678	−8,991,560	–	–
Austria	1,585,370	−1,307,892	7,476	Tons
Denmark	1,270,467	−1,438,660	10,922	Tons
Japan	1,264,698	−17,884,991	–	–
Slovakia	1,057,183	−192,775	5,373	Tons
India	1,012,830	−9,626,226	3,001,490	Units
Spain	961,993	−3,635,299	7,374,683	Units
South Korea	889,615	−7,511,486	4,700	Tons
Australia	751,466	−7,607,295	4,590,374	Units
Israel	701,146	−1,532,226	2,383	Tons
Greece	651,566	−504,889	4,277	Tons
Switzerland	641,570	−3,148,038	2,812	Tons
Norway	404,929	−3,263,895	2,367	Tons
United Arab Emirates	402,996	−7,898,155	–	–
Panama	354,145	−165,517	2,614	Tons
Romania	344,036	−1,008,835	4,562	Tons
Lithuania	316,142	−195,540	1,506	Tons
Finland	285,270	−1,480,295	2,195	Tons
Indonesia	224,046	−3,488,904	3,965	Tons
South Africa	203,186	−1,791,190	797,114	Units
Latvia	194,485	−122,347	818	Tons
Turkey	185,643	−2,884,035	2,077	Tons
Bulgaria	180,735	−270,154	1,083	Tons
Brazil	155,082	−1,684,219	459	Tons
Saudi Arabia	124,350	−3,074,327	1,993	Tons
Portugal	108,397	−901,755	837	Tons
Slovenia	104,687	−194,035	505	Tons
Kazakhstan	97,691	−800,967	971	Tons
New Zealand	90,185	−933,667	653	Tons
Armenia	79,302	−137,389	234	Tons
Estonia	76,903	−172,037	608	Tons
Serbia	73,821	−193,990	346	Tons
Luxembourg	73,011	−197,234	1,085	Tons
Chile	72,093	−1,433,300	–	–
Croatia	51,290	−306,612	306	Tons
Russia	27,313	−4,330,324	–	–
Morocco	22,733	−241,964	–	–
Egypt	20,081	−340,303	56	Tons
Somalia	15,423	−6,398	–	–
Tunisia	14,791	−135,623	–	–
Angola	14,416	−84,237	20	Tons
Costa Rica	12,992	−341,458	232	Tons
Moldova	12,426	−71,055	85	Tons
Ukraine	12,393	−747,295	59	Tons
Macao	12,353	−278,490	42	Tons
Iceland	10,996	−627,412	104	Tons
Colombia	10,360	−1,352,858	279	Tons
Senegal	9,228	−19,191	26	Tons
Belarus	9,211	−101,356	–	–
Uzbekistan	8,802	−557,664	39	Tons
Malta	8,483	−62,614	28,259	Units
North Macedonia	7,217	−53,293	47	Tons
Cyprus	7,213	−95,784	39	Tons
Mongolia	6,442	−97,412	18	Tons
Peru	5,590	−930,476	101	Tons
Laos	4,472	−27,069	–	–
Kenya	4,465	−134,902	45	Tons
Lebanon	4,449	−35,051	–	–
Georgia	4,207	−149,761	52	Tons
Kyrgyzstan	3,989	−74,747	16	Tons
Guatemala	3,782	−301,061	102	Tons
Montserrat	3,496	3,230	–	–
Mauritius	3,484	−58,964	7,456	Units
Bosnia and Herzegovina	3,273	−73,553	42	Tons
Qatar	3,246	−250,398	–	–
El Salvador	3,179	−183,696	77	Tons
Kuwait	3,089	−326,584	303	Tons
Uganda	2,538	−106,317	94	Tons
Ecuador	2,507	−347,400	28	Tons
Bangladesh	2,352	−233,386	–	–
Dominican Republic	2,304	−130,956	82	Tons
Côte d'Ivoire	2,190	−42,397	26	Tons
Albania	2,094	−39,526	–	–
Azerbaijan	2,083	−223,183	15	Tons
Botswana	1,695	−51,782	105	Tons
Algeria	1,633	−185,915	–	–
Nigeria	1,597	−204,257	–	–
Pakistan	1,469	−348,973	–	–
Bahrain	1,422	−53,839	–	–
Cambodia	1,412	−35,388	16	Tons
Argentina	1,388	−680,960	7	Tons
Iran	1,388	−33,376	–	–
Uruguay	1,380	−134,837	50	Tons
Brunei	1,332	−33,130	2,825	Units
Liberia	1,329	−7,313	–	–
Namibia	1,312	−59,640	49	Tons
Sri Lanka	1,312	−121,930	–	–
Oman	1,178	−144,214	–	–
Fiji	1,044	−26,735	1,434	Units
Honduras	973	−101,790	24	Tons
Tanzania	962	−94,319	24	Tons
Paraguay	951	−409,321	39	Tons
Trinidad and Tobago	860	−42,542	–	–
Sierra Leone	855	−6,896	–	–
Ethiopia	836	−409,250	–	–
Guyana	778	−23,627	15	Tons
Bahamas	749	−22,602	63,107	Units
Papua New Guinea	742	−39,512	–	–
Nicaragua	722	−45,998	114	Tons
Jordan	719	−64,064	–	–
Jamaica	685	−40,974	–	–
United States Minor Outlying Islands	679	−1,935	–	–
Guinea-Bissau	668	−3,554	1	Tons
Iraq	638	−143,365	–	–
Haiti	596	−4,757	–	–
Myanmar	596	−22,616	3	Tons
Cayman Islands	579	−44,771	–	–
Ghana	569	−100,285	–	–
Zambia	552	−40,366	4	Tons
North Korea	550	503	–	–
Eritrea	529	−533	–	–
Mali	521	−16,925	–	–
Cameroon	515	−32,974	–	–
Andorra	474	−17,132	–	–
Zimbabwe	413	−79,655	14	Tons
Afghanistan	373	−7,634	–	–
Montenegro	350	−38,189	2	Tons
Gabon	341	−13,906	–	–
Bolivia	341	−48,428	2	Tons
Eswatini	336	−12,031	–	–
DR Congo	313	−44,445	–	–
Barbados	311	−23,807	3	Tons
Djibouti	310	−39,989	–	–
New Caledonia	271	−14,983	–	–
Mauritania	266	−6,641	3	Tons
Belize	250	−11,918	4	Tons
French Southern and Antarctic Territories	241	57	1	Tons
Lesotho	239	−10,426	3	Tons
Saint Lucia	215	−4,396	–	–
Micronesia	206	−1,497	–	–
Venezuela	206	−92,579	–	–
British Virgin Islands	200	−2,364	–	–
Christmas Island	187	−75	–	–
Greenland	184	−8,165	–	–
Bermuda	181	−8,324	1	Tons
Suriname	177	−7,490	4	Tons
Grenada	168	−6,179	–	–
Togo	166	−33,858	2	Tons
Bhutan	151	−25,004	–	–
Cocos (Keeling) Islands	145	−53	–	–
Rwanda	139	−21,445	–	–
Saint Helena	139	−1,235	–	–
Sudan	133	−17,798	–	–
Malawi	128	−31,260	2	Tons
Curaçao	127	−17,055	–	–
Gibraltar	125	−2,791	–	–
Tokelau	117	92	–	–
Turkmenistan	117	−27,299	–	–
Madagascar	114	−15,862	53	Tons
Timor-Leste	111	−7,234	–	–
Faroe Islands	105	−18,001	6	Tons
Guinea	101	−17,245	–	–
Burkina Faso	98	−13,500	14	Tons
Congo	85	−31,079	–	–
Tonga	84	−3,101	–	–
Cuba	80	−38,852	–	–
Aruba	80	−12,930	–	–
Saint Kitts and Nevis	77	−4,094	–	–
Seychelles	64	−10,007	2	Tons
Sao Tome and Principe	61	−2,050	–	–
Mozambique	59	−43,823	–	–
Norfolk Island	58	−676	–	–
Dominica	56	−1,139	–	–
Tajikistan	54	−7,776	–	–
Tuvalu	53	−317	–	–
Benin	53	−16,224	2	Tons
Nauru	45	−870	–	–
Libya	44	−73,564	4	Tons
Antigua and Barbuda	44	−3,536	1	Tons
French Polynesia	34	−18,721	–	–
Palestine, State of	34	−1,411	–	–
South Sudan	33	−2,283	–	–
Pitcairn	33	33	–	–
Turks and Caicos Islands	32	−2,220	–	–
Burundi	32	−7,522	14	Tons
Nepal	30	−117,491	–	–
Yemen	24	−2,125	–	–
Vanuatu	19	−4,934	–	–
Sint Maarten (Dutch part)	15	−836	3	Tons
Cook Islands	11	−995	–	–
Wallis and Futuna	11	−194	–	–
Saint Vincent and the Grenadines	10	−1,787	–	–
British Indian Ocean Territory	10	−15	–	–
Comoros	9	−675	–	–
Niue	9	−134	–	–
Syria	9	−4,871	–	–
Niger	8	−7,757	–	–
Chad	6	−7,492	–	–
Equatorial Guinea	6	−4,968	–	–
Marshall Islands	6	−3,071	–	–
Solomon Islands	5	−3,633	–	–
Bonaire, Sint Eustatius and Saba	5	−2,946	–	–
Palau	4	−731	–	–
Samoa	4	−2,836	–	–
Northern Mariana Islands	3	−43	–	–
Anguilla	3	−650	–	–
Kiribati	2	−921	–	–
Falkland Islands	2	−1,056	2	Units
Saint Pierre and Miquelon	1	−966	–	–
Western Sahara	1	−2	–	–

== Observatory of Economic Complexity ==
Data is for 2023, in United States dollars.

List of countries by computer exports (2023)
Country	Trade value
China	178,148,153,800
Mexico	32,500,155,618
Taiwan	26,300,670,152
United States	25,140,762,108
Netherlands	18,769,284,099
Vietnam	17,558,023,866
Thailand	14,825,410,160
Germany	14,184,085,346
Czechia	10,377,091,648
Malaysia	7,015,862,803
Singapore	6,105,152,087
Poland	5,891,100,869
Hungary	5,031,059,140
Ireland	4,838,877,277
South Korea	4,687,516,344
United Kingdom	3,986,609,546
United Arab Emirates	3,708,102,026
Hong Kong	3,536,502,265
Philippines	3,448,083,092
Japan	2,200,375,795
France	2,130,211,822
Italy	1,630,812,711
Sweden	1,523,756,518
Canada	1,438,769,675
Belgium	1,216,420,367
Denmark	936,556,347
Austria	909,405,962
Slovakia	901,605,395
Spain	832,885,365
Greece	583,517,675
Switzerland	580,973,880
Israel	544,456,205
Indonesia	493,024,918
India	382,489,630
Australia	381,230,647
Finland	375,666,100
Romania	313,624,518
Norway	245,658,287
Lithuania	236,750,493
South Africa	236,744,057
Bulgaria	212,494,871
Turkey	207,077,266
Latvia	182,383,860
Kazakhstan	169,014,858
Portugal	132,586,454
Brazil	127,817,741
Armenia	101,073,689
Slovenia	96,933,461
New Zealand	77,288,047
Serbia	73,981,162
Estonia	65,263,411
Bahrain	64,555,162
Chile	44,457,724
Luxembourg	40,672,742
Croatia	38,959,390
Saudi Arabia	29,832,586
Tunisia	26,501,717
Russia	26,426,722
Cyprus	23,983,235
Uzbekistan	23,734,289
Ukraine	17,356,017
Oman	16,901,228
Peru	13,600,442
Qatar	13,362,703
Panama	13,301,263
Kyrgyzstan	12,333,453
Costa Rica	12,024,829
Azerbaijan	11,879,030
Belarus	11,627,839
Moldova	9,974,914
Sri Lanka	9,731,843
Dominican Republic	9,644,939
Malta	9,069,549
Cambodia	8,790,708
North Macedonia	8,306,140
Colombia	8,204,327
Iceland	8,034,264
Bangladesh	7,823,120
Kenya	7,062,607
Lebanon	7,002,590
Morocco	6,205,254
Mauritius	5,958,486
Egypt	5,831,789
Guatemala	5,504,950
Macau	4,334,915
Curacao	4,315,672
El Salvador	4,188,002
Bosnia and Herzegovina	3,850,131
Uganda	3,581,941
Pakistan	3,487,517
Jordan	3,277,517
Iran	2,942,570
Kuwait	2,866,073
Uruguay	2,642,154
Tanzania	2,157,328
Laos	1,868,615
Albania	1,864,784
Ecuador	1,792,429
Seychelles	1,624,905
Argentina	1,601,010
Bhutan	1,571,538
Botswana	1,554,125
Cote d'Ivoire	1,458,060
Nigeria	1,361,417
Fiji	1,310,280
Myanmar	1,261,449
Honduras	1,155,225
Ethiopia	1,154,355
Cayman Islands	1,138,134
Eswatini	1,055,707
Georgia	1,031,551
Paraguay	929,465
Jamaica	911,652
Algeria	824,671
Ghana	798,544
Zambia	776,729
Andorra	770,711
Togo	770,185
Senegal	722,353
Namibia	653,233
Brunei	624,964
Republic of the Congo	618,446
Afghanistan	617,434
Nicaragua	607,721
Zimbabwe	598,679
Cameroon	568,747
Iraq	565,332
Montenegro	556,766
Bolivia	536,962
Madagascar	523,910
Christmas Island	489,389
New Caledonia	488,887
Tonga	486,640
Turks and Caicos Islands	420,120
Sudan	400,780
Rwanda	367,554
Sierra Leone	356,506
French Polynesia	349,769
Gabon	336,839
Papua New Guinea	335,246
Angola	300,469
Mozambique	292,856
North Korea	289,663
Trinidad and Tobago	272,723
Palau	267,258
Mali	230,934
Equatorial Guinea	230,305
Saint Lucia	227,590
Greenland	223,437
Gibraltar	223,385
Guyana	220,420
Bahamas	206,731
Haiti	172,292
Malawi	163,393
Burkina Faso	163,026
Saint Helena	151,659
Barbados	141,373
DR Congo	140,170
Central African Republic	133,451
Timor-Leste	123,274
Niger	105,560
San Marino	105,325
Nepal	104,295
Lesotho	88,690
Tajikistan	83,167
Mongolia	75,702
Saint Kitts and Nevis	59,917
Cuba	59,162
American Samoa	59,012
Venezuela	58,328
Yemen	51,897
Samoa	50,388
Guinea	46,262
Cape Verde	44,553
Solomon Islands	43,375
Suriname	42,497
British Virgin Islands	37,440
Maldives	37,399
Saint Martin	36,300
Chad	36,089
Northern Mariana Islands	35,291
Tokelau	34,388
Anguilla	31,572
Marshall Islands	31,444
Gambia	29,535
Libya	26,990
Antigua and Barbuda	26,138
Bermuda	25,606
Tuvalu	23,653
Falkland Islands	23,051
Mauritania	22,899
Burundi	21,705
Saint Vincent and the Grenadines	21,539
Guam	20,172
Montserrat	19,429
Bonaire	19,367
Benin	17,984
Pitcairn Islands	17,884
Djibouti	17,679
Turkmenistan	17,492
Saint Barthelemy	16,843
Grenada	15,418
Aruba	15,055
Belize	14,933
Liberia	14,898
Nauru	14,285
Vanuatu	14,205
Somalia	14,113
South Sudan	11,576
Cook Islands	6,953
Micronesia	6,512
Cocos (Keeling) Islands	5,897
Niue	5,813
Sao Tome and Principe	3,231
Dominica	2,949
Palestine	2,489
Saint Pierre and Miquelon	2,319
Comoros	2,001
Eritrea	1,986
British Indian Ocean Territory	609
Guinea-Bissau	505
Syria	383
Kiribati	81
French South Antarctic Territory	12
