= List of countries by gold exports =

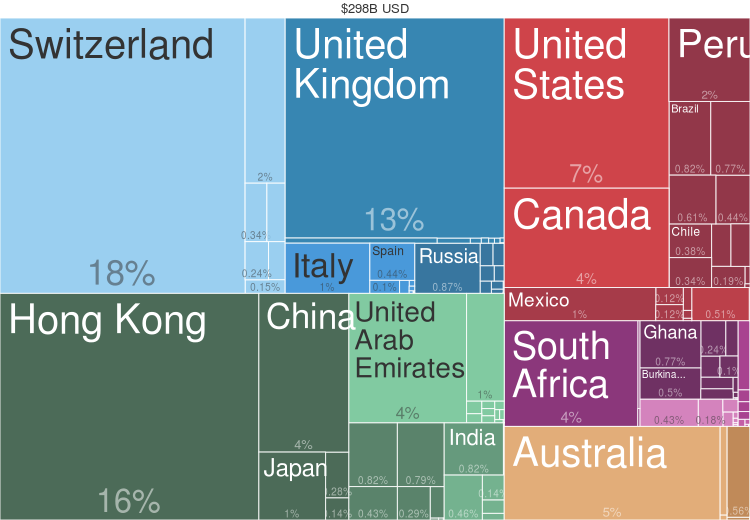
Gold countries export treemap (2014)

The following is a list of countries by gold exports.

== International Trade Centre ==
Data is for 2024, in thousands of United States dollars and tons.

List of countries by gold exports (2024)
Country	Value exported (thousands USD)	Trade balance (thousands USD)	Quantity exported (tons)
World	586,665,814	3,472,067	9,545
Switzerland	105,193,858	11,162,203	2,123
China	102,861,254	−90,398,996	1,383
United Kingdom	77,170,435	−11,243,215	992
Hong Kong	65,452,651	−8,887,189	887
India	51,781,603	−51,429,033	725
United Arab Emirates	32,545,780	21,715,162	518
Singapore	17,633,169	−246,547	317
Turkey	17,102,291	−13,620,510	232
United States	15,949,710	13,729,232	220
Thailand	15,429,516	−6,799,969	199
Italy	10,348,188	−5,244,110	208
Canada	9,603,739	18,377,972	207
Saudi Arabia	8,169,553	−6,394,636	156
Australia	6,518,067	17,040,326	0
Germany	6,118,738	8,899,648	81
Armenia	5,943,260	−337,981	199
Indonesia	4,582,910	−3,520,732	117
Malaysia	4,042,271	−3,075,327	304
Azerbaijan	3,312,935	−3,101,026	41
Uganda	3,272,753	104,660	85
France	3,203,998	342,984	69
Taiwan	2,684,718	−1,506,120	35
South Korea	2,302,354	−1,082,227	33
Austria	1,682,821	383,440	22
Vietnam	1,342,865	−1,315,336	22
South Africa	1,122,064	7,052,232	15
Kuwait	1,065,410	−851,307	14
Lebanon	783,624	−667,381	11
Belgium	597,374	646,998	178
Kazakhstan	541,192	−123,022	7
Japan	500,759	17,349,565	9
Iran	496,940	−496,939	6
Poland	454,301	−231,628	6
Oman	436,977	−374,198	6
Netherlands	412,343	36,969	0
Spain	409,419	2,781,015	0
Jordan	408,834	−257,662	5
Tajikistan	352,659	−11,117	5
Dominican Republic	303,597	1,221,694	7
Czech Republic	230,644	−121,741	0
Bangladesh	226,773	−226,773	3
Bulgaria	210,301	−163,338	3
Estonia	198,244	−18,651	3
Croatia	186,477	−108,783	3
Russia	180,401	12,132,988	2
Laos	173,486	541,563	2
Egypt	166,204	3,078,923	3
Cambodia	165,154	302,748	3
Slovakia	162,856	−128,777	0
Slovenia	160,678	−124,871	2
Israel	134,967	−129,002	2
Mexico	131,625	3,545,407	0
Hungary	102,710	−17,746	0
Serbia	102,334	−83,719	1
Uzbekistan	102,068	13,465,432	0
Iraq	92,546	−86,009	1
Romania	89,102	150,525	0
Philippines	86,977	1,283,877	13
Morocco	85,527	−63,107	2
Bhutan	83,959	−83,958	1
Portugal	62,664	153,959	1
Malta	60,906	−146	1
Tunisia	60,153	−60,153	1
Sweden	52,203	712,501	0
Macao	50,482	−49,327	1
Cayman Islands	43,119	−43,119	1
Ghana	38,365	5,874,105	0
Mauritius	37,811	−35,892	1
Bahrain	36,118	−36,114	0
Tokelau	31,194	−31,194	0
New Zealand	29,211	578,509	1
Denmark	26,983	−5,504	1
Ireland	26,795	−15,818	1
Finland	26,167	−23,683	1
Latvia	24,637	−15,601	0
Ukraine	24,103	−22,144	0
Pakistan	23,318	−23,318	0
Gibraltar	22,308	−22,307	0
Luxembourg	20,334	147,065	1
Greece	19,109	−3,233	1
Qatar	18,291	−16,584	0
Lithuania	17,778	−15,430	0
Albania	14,015	−14,015	0
Cyprus	12,485	−492	0
Nepal	11,550	−11,550	0
Benin	11,111	−31	7
Andorra	10,959	−10,948	0
Rwanda	9,481	−9,481	0
Turks and Caicos Islands	8,189	−8,189	0
North Macedonia	7,201	−7,201	0
Panama	7,138	26,694	0
Nigeria	6,943	193,971	0
Brazil	6,851	3,953,570	1
Montenegro	5,518	−5,518	0
Norway	5,299	206,811	1
Sri Lanka	4,438	−4,438	0
Costa Rica	4,322	35,284	0
Tanzania	4,269	3,415,375	0
Zambia	2,476	109,259	0
Algeria	2,413	−1,438	0
Tuvalu	2,134	−2,134	0
Guatemala	1,896	−1,896	0
Kyrgyzstan	1,764	1,404,216	0
Brunei	1,713	259	0
Aruba	1,361	−1,123	0
Bosnia and Herzegovina	1,185	−302	1
Senegal	1,002	929,216	0
Iceland	868	−865	3
Trinidad and Tobago	561	−561	0
Faroe Islands	494	−494	0
Eswatini	484	1,573	0
El Salvador	303	−234	0
Ecuador	298	1,026,005	0
Bolivia	256	686,375	0
Belarus	237	−237	0
DR Congo	195	2,343	0
French Polynesia	164	159	0
Honduras	147	193,098	0
Central African Republic	141	31,927	20
Syria	115	−115	0
Maldives	96	−96	0
Chile	93	1,432,928	0
Niger	92	4,069	0
New Caledonia	82	−52	0
Peru	75	12,688,174	0
Greenland	45	−45	0
Uruguay	41	4,988	0
Moldova	39	1,495	0
Vanuatu	36	−36	0
Botswana	33	2,216	0
Sint Maarten (Dutch part)	32	−32	0
Mali	27	703,263	0
Fiji	27	74,789	0
Argentina	25	1,628,255	0
Curaçao	24	683	0
Colombia	23	4,103,502	0
Bahamas	17	93	0
Equatorial Guinea	15	−15	0
Samoa	13	−13	0
Grenada	11	−11	0
Jamaica	10	−10	0
Zimbabwe	10	2,524,744	1
Gabon	8	−8	0
Bermuda	8	−8	0
Guyana	7	956,737	0
Libya	6	4,680	0
Côte d'Ivoire	5	3,143,968	0
Angola	5	2,771	0
Falkland Islands (Malvinas)	4	−4	0
Nicaragua	4	1,353,940	0
Saint Kitts and Nevis	4	−4	0
Haiti	3	−3	0
Barbados	3	1	1
Burkina Faso	3	4,643,569	0
Antigua and Barbuda	2	−2	0
Cook Islands	2	−2	0
Georgia	2	104,697	0
Kenya	2	24,063	0
Malawi	1	−1	0
Seychelles	1	−1	0
Papua New Guinea	1	2,530,567	0
Palau	1	−1	0

== Observatory of Economic Complexity ==
Data is for 2023, in United States dollars.

List of countries by gold exports
Country	Trade value
Switzerland	99,246,272,527
United Arab Emirates	47,098,921,839
United Kingdom	27,557,250,968
South Africa	25,912,919,232
United States	22,617,322,380
Canada	22,124,903,095
Australia	21,400,139,842
Hong Kong	19,098,989,326
Kazakhstan	18,259,126,303
Japan	13,663,982,171
Russia	13,589,580,150
Uzbekistan	11,161,021,158
Singapore	10,155,527,036
Guinea	9,649,858,609
Peru	8,396,669,335
Ghana	7,985,341,089
Germany	7,657,814,216
Burkina Faso	7,181,938,166
Mali	6,275,902,357
Mexico	6,259,469,954
Thailand	6,174,023,187
Turkey	4,616,708,627
Uganda	4,295,226,482
Cote d'Ivoire	4,282,638,120
Tanzania	4,140,122,522
China	4,089,930,135
Zimbabwe	3,678,363,354
Spain	3,655,976,303
Italy	3,606,923,394
Brazil	3,497,241,189
Philippines	3,308,377,937
Colombia	3,082,791,505
Togo	2,651,837,679
France	2,562,409,450
Bolivia	2,486,291,950
Argentina	2,368,281,018
Austria	2,234,023,674
Egypt	1,991,238,302
Zambia	1,943,428,732
Suriname	1,866,360,568
Papua New Guinea	1,853,662,374
Armenia	1,832,933,976
Cambodia	1,782,094,138
Sweden	1,755,641,822
Nigeria	1,535,831,879
Mauritania	1,497,057,998
Ecuador	1,477,956,970
South Korea	1,463,249,946
Indonesia	1,444,489,389
Kyrgyzstan	1,411,165,010
Iraq	1,332,037,730
Saudi Arabia	1,298,390,894
Dominican Republic	1,276,446,924
Finland	1,256,314,793
Namibia	1,255,833,062
Malaysia	1,247,789,761
Taiwan	1,226,979,878
Belgium	1,218,705,576
Chile	1,194,012,425
Nicaragua	1,140,616,107
Chad	1,107,035,998
Senegal	1,092,023,022
Sudan	1,033,733,514
Cameroon	951,440,006
Guyana	917,963,656
Rwanda	884,856,733
Mongolia	834,910,892
Libya	797,651,180
Liberia	766,533,249
Mozambique	700,670,241
Benin	676,832,052
Laos	652,953,603
Congo	621,974,599
Niger	545,190,592
New Zealand	484,524,716
Tajikistan	467,988,216
Jordan	416,679,113
Luxembourg	346,122,476
Somalia	315,186,674
Netherlands	295,229,224
Yemen	264,907,339
Madagascar	255,844,006
Portugal	236,862,155
Ethiopia	232,351,543
DR Congo	217,668,623
Poland	213,931,601
Azerbaijan	208,648,347
Romania	206,722,827
Lebanon	201,405,657
Kuwait	164,515,057
Norway	161,766,734
Paraguay	137,312,214
Eritrea	136,046,683
Honduras	133,036,056
Burundi	132,145,428
India	131,601,197
Czech Republic	126,079,589
Oman	119,344,987
Estonia	117,725,791
Central African Republic	112,305,098
Panama	109,193,605
Bahrain	96,371,912
Croatia	91,631,056
Georgia	89,804,139
Hungary	79,040,116
Gabon	69,563,695
Pakistan	61,797,551
Solomon Islands	59,298,445
Kenya	54,729,763
Denmark	49,342,355
Fiji	48,272,744
Greece	43,654,262
Angola	42,826,873
Belarus	38,381,563
Bulgaria	33,754,958
Slovenia	32,004,174
Botswana	30,505,562
Morocco	28,282,481
South Sudan	27,378,590
Albania	26,983,528
Slovakia	24,906,854
Israel	23,809,226
Costa Rica	23,286,937
Ireland	22,142,882
Serbia	20,854,194
Latvia	18,917,812
Malawi	14,900,684
Curacao	13,194,849
Qatar	11,606,936
Vietnam	10,691,017
Venezuela	10,539,763
Sierra Leone	8,535,609
Cyprus	7,337,975
Macau	7,051,602
Guatemala	6,776,791
Uruguay	6,377,904
Lithuania	6,365,147
Bosnia and Herzegovina	4,247,840
Sri Lanka	4,145,699
Andorra	3,964,337
Malta	3,580,013
Vanuatu	3,113,236
Ukraine	3,007,137
Algeria	2,530,994
Tonga	1,958,940
Brunei	1,857,058
Eswatini	1,845,367
Moldova	1,744,729
Mauritius	1,619,690
Gambia	1,561,057
Gibraltar	881,564
Cuba	682,902
Barbados	578,796
Bangladesh	205,999
Maldives	130,012
Jamaica	109,277
Nepal	70,295
Antigua and Barbuda	49,914
New Caledonia	44,348
Cayman Islands	35,501
Comoros	31,538
Bahamas	7,178
Tunisia	6,637
Iran	4,875
Belize	2,450
Myanmar	11
