= List of countries by silicon production =

Silicon production

This is a list of countries by silicon production in 2024, based on USGS figures.

Silicon (Si) is a light chemical element that combines with oxygen and other elements to form silicates. Silicon in the form of silicates constitutes more than 25% of the Earth's crust. Silica (SiO_{2}) as quartz or quartzite is used to produce silicon ferroalloys and silicon metal. Demand for silicon ferroalloys is driven principally by the production of cast iron and steel. Silicon metal, which generally is produced like ferrosilicon in submerged-arc electric furnaces, is used not as a ferroalloy, but rather for alloying with aluminum and for production of chemicals, especially silicones. Small quantities of silicon are processed into high-purity silicon for use in the semiconductor industry.

In 2024, China accounted for almost 80% of total global estimated silicon production.

List of countries by silicon production (in thousands of metric tons per year)
Country / region	Ferrosilicon production	Silicon metal production	Total silicon production
World	5100	4600	9700
China	3500	3900	7400
Russia	470	50	520
Brazil	200	190	390
United States	–	–	310
Norway	180	120	300
Kazakhstan	130	7	137
Malaysia	130	–	130
France	20	90	110
Iceland	70	20	90
Bhutan	80	–	80
India	60	-	60
Canada	20	30	50
Spain	40	5	45
Australia	-	40	40
Poland	30	-	30
Other countries	130	78	208
