= FAO Country Profiles =

- Developer: FAO of the United Nations
- Stable release: 2012 / 2001
- Type: Knowledge Representation, Ontology Editor
- Website: FAO Country Profiles

The FAO Country Profiles is a multilingual web portal that repackages the Food and Agriculture Organization of the United Nations (FAO) information archive on its global activities in agriculture and food security in a single area and catalogues it exclusively by country and thematic areas.

The organization aims to offer decision-makers, researchers and project formulators around the world a fast and reliable way to access country-specific information on national food security situations without the need to search individual databases and systems. It aids FAO's database by providing a simple interface containing interactive maps and charts.

== Background ==
FAO has highlighted information and knowledge sharing as priority areas in fighting hunger and achieving food security. In this context, FAO identified countries could improve their national programs on agriculture and food security if they accessed FAO's information through a cross-sectoral (or interdisciplinary) country-based approach. Despite the existence of a large number of country-based information systems in FAO, the information managed by the various systems lacked integration. Information was generated and used in a circumscribed manner and tailored to a specific system, department or sector.

The FAO Country Profiles portal, initially called FAO Country Profiles and Mapping Information System, was launched in 2002 responding to the Organization's need to provide FAO website users with an easy-to-use mechanism to find FAO country-specific information without the need to search individual FAO web sites, databases or systems. The system was designed to integrate analytical and multilingual information with thematic databases and digital map repositories and to facilitate access to information on multiple factors contributing to national food insecurity.

Since its launch, the system has grown by incorporating more and more data sources. This was achieved thanks to a corporate effort to reduce information silos and the adoption of international standards for country-based information management throughout the Organization.

== Country Profiles ==
The methodology behind the FAO Country Profiles is rather simple; it links, reuses and repackages data and information from most relevant existing FAO databases and systems.

The FAO Country Profiles covers current FAO Members and Associated Nations. Once a country is selected, the portal presents to the user documents, news feeds, statistical data, project details and maps from relevant FAO databases and systems for the selected country, categorized according to thematic areas.

The thematic areas are grouped in two categories:

- FAO Core Activities: these correspond to FAO's main areas of expertise, such as natural resources, economics, agriculture, forestry, fisheries and technical cooperation. This grouping is based on the work of the corresponding FAO departments.
- Global issues: these are themes that FAO identified as priority areas for action, and include biodiversity, biotechnology, climate change, diseases and pests, emergency and aid, food security and safety, trade and prices, water management. These priority areas correspond to FAO's strategic response to a fast-changing world where issues ranging from biotechnology to climate change and trade present new challenges and choices to governments and the general public.

=== Data sources ===
Country pages provide access to or integrate the following thematic profiles and systems.

==== FAO data sources ====
- Aquastat Country Profiles: The AQUASTAT country profiles describe the state of water resources and agricultural water use in the respective country. Special attention is given to water resource, irrigation, and drainage sub-sectors.
- Biotechnology Country Profiles: The objective of the profiles is to provide a platform on which developing country biotechnology-related policies, regulations and activities can be readily accessed, directing the user to key, updated sources of information.
- BIODEC Biotechnologies in Developing Countries: FAO-BioDeC is a database meant to gather, store, organize, and disseminate updated baseline information on state-of-the-art crop biotechnology products and techniques, which are in use, or in the pipeline in developing countries. The database includes about 2000 entries from 70 developing countries, including countries with economies in transition.
- Country Pasture/Forage Resource Profiles: The Country Pasture/Forage Resource Profile provides a broad overview of relevant general, topographical, climatic and agro-ecological information with focus on livestock production systems and the pasture/forage resources.
- FAO Corporate Document Repository: The FAO Corporate Document Repository houses FAO documents and publications, as well as selected non-FAO publications, in electronic format.
- FAO Projects in the country: From the Field Program Management Information System.
- FAO Terminology - Names of Countries: In order to standardize and harmonize the vast quantity of terms used in FAO documents and publications, the Organization developed the terminology database FAOTERM. The Corporate NAMES OF COUNTRIES database also aims at facilitating the consultation and harmonization of country names throughout the Organization.
- Fisheries and Aquaculture Country Profiles: FAO's Fisheries and Aquaculture Department prepares and publishes Fishery and Aquaculture Country Profiles. Each profile summarizes the department's assessment of activities and trends in fisheries and aquaculture for the country concerned. Economic and demographic data is based on UN or World Bank sources; data on fisheries is generally published by the FAO Fisheries and Aquaculture Department.
- Forestry Country Profiles: The forestry country profiles provide detailed information on forests and the forest sector: forest cover (types, extent and change), forest management, policies, products and trade, and more - in all some 30 pages for each country.
- FAO-GeoNetwork: FAO-GeoNetwork is a web-based Geographic Data and Information Management System. It enables easy access to local and distributed geospatial information catalogues and makes available data, graphics, and documents for immediate download. FAO-GeoNetwork holds approximately 5000 standardized metadata records for digital and paper maps, most of them at the global, continent and national level.
- Global Information and Early Warning System on Food and Agriculture (GIEWS): The System aims to provide policy-makers and policy-analysts with the most up-to-date information available on all aspects of food supply and demand, warning of imminent food crises, so that timely interventions can be planned.
- Livestock Sector Briefs: The purpose of the Livestock Sector Briefs are to provide a concise overview of livestock production in the selected countries through tables, maps and graphs.
- Nutrition Country Profiles: The Nutrition Country Profiles (NCP) provide concise analytical summaries describing the food and nutrition situation in individual countries.

==== Partnerships data sources ====
- AgriFeeds: AgriFeeds is a service that allows users to search and filter news and events from several agricultural information sources. It harvests, stores and re-aggregates news and events from feeds published by agricultural organizations and information services.
- International Portal on Food Safety, Animal & Plant Health (IPFSAPH): IPFSAPH facilitates trade in food and agriculture by providing a single access point to authorized official international and national information across the sectors of food safety, animal and plant health. It has been developed by FAO in association with the organizations responsible for international standard setting in sanitary and phytosanitary matters.

==== Non-FAO data sources ====
- Earthtrends, World Resources Institute: EarthTrends is a comprehensive online database, maintained by the World Resources Institute, that focuses on the environmental, social, and economic trends that shape the world. The Earthtrends country profiles present environmental information about key variables for different topic areas.
- International Fund for Agricultural Development (IFAD): Rural poverty country profiles are produced by IFAD.

== Standards ==
Geopolitical information section in the FAO Country Profiles.

There are various international standards and coding systems to manage country information. Historically, systems dealing with different types of data used different coding systems that were tailored to specific data type requirements. For example, statistical systems in the United Nations commonly use the M-49 classification and pigmentation (also known as UN code) or the FAOSTAT area classification; mapping systems could use geographic coordinates or GAUL codes; textual systems (document repositories or web sites) could use ISO 3166-1 alpha-2, ISO 3166-1 alpha-3 or AGROVOC keywords; etc.

The FAO Country Profiles provide access to systems managing statistics, documents, maps, news feeds, etc., therefore one of its key aspects to succeed was the mapping of all these country codes.

For this purpose a geopolitical ontology was developed. This ontology, among other features, maps ISO2, ISO3, AGROVOC, FAOSTAT, FAOTERM, GAUL, UN, and UNDP codes for all countries.

== Global Resources ==
Besides the profiles for each country the portal also provides access to other important global resources, such as:

=== Low-Income Food Deficit Countries (LIFDC) ===
The FAO Country Profiles keeps updated for the public the list of LIFDC countries. This list is revised every year according to the methodology explained below. The new list of the LIFDC, stands at 62 countries, four less than in the (2012) list. These are: Georgia, Syrian Arab Republic, Timor-Leste, Republic of Moldova. While Moldova graduated from the list on the basis of net food-exporter criterion, the other graduated based on income criterion.

==== LIFDC methodology ====
The classification of a country as low-income food-deficit used for analytical purposes by FAO is traditionally determined by three criteria:

1. A country should have a per capita income below the "historical" ceiling used by the World Bank to determine eligibility for IDA assistance and for 20-year IBRD terms, applied to countries included in the World Bank categories I and II. For instance, the historical ceiling of per capita gross national income (GNI) for 2006, based on the World Bank Atlas method, was US$1,735, i.e. higher than the level established for 2005 ($1,675).
2. The net food trade position of a country averaged over the preceding three years for which statistics are available, in this case from 2003 to 2005. Trade volumes for a broad basket of basic foodstuffs (cereals, roots and tubers, pulses, oilseeds and oils other than tree crop oils, meat and dairy products) are converted and aggregated by the calorie content of individual commodities.
3. A self-exclusion criterion is applied when countries that meet the above two criteria specifically request FAO to be excluded from the LIFDC category.

In order to avoid countries changing their LIFDC status too frequently - typically due to short-term, exogenous shocks - an additional factor was introduced in 2001. This factor, called "persistence of position", would postpone the "exit" of a LIFDC from the list, despite the country not meeting the LIFDC income criterion or the food-deficit criterion, until the change in its status is verified for three consecutive years.

=== FAO Member Countries and Flags ===
The FAO Country Profiles is FAO's source for dissemination of FAO's Member Nations and Associated Nations official flags. The update of any country flag is coordinated with the other United Nations agencies. All flags are made available in a standardized manner which also aims to help web site owners to ensure that they always display the official country flag.

The standard URL for any given country flag would be composed by: the generic URL: "http://www.fao.org/countryprofiles/flags/%5B%5D" to which the ISO 3166-1 Alpha-2 code for the country is added, plus the image format suffix ".gif". For instance, the URL for the Argentina flag would be: http://www.fao.org/countryprofiles/flags/AR.gif, with AR being the ISO 3166-1 alpha-2 code of Argentina.

== Criticism ==
Early criticism of the FAO Country Profiles was that it only contained few resources. Since 2002, the number of available resources has increased to cover country-based information and data, directly linked from FAO's web pages or FAO's digital repositories. Over the last years, another identified area for improvement was the simplicity of the system methodology, being the resources only linked from country pages and thus, lacking real integration. This need was addressed by starting to integrate additional data, such as, the fisheries charts or the news and events items taken from AgriFeeds.

== See also ==
- Agricultural Information Management Standards
- AGROVOC
- Country codes
- Food and Agriculture Organization
- Forestry Information Centre
- Geopolitical ontology
