= Geopolitical ontology =

Type of dictionary

The FAO geopolitical ontology is an ontology developed by the Food and Agriculture Organization of the United Nations (FAO) to describe, manage and exchange data related to geopolitical entities such as countries, territories, regions and other similar areas.

== Definitions and examples ==
An ontology is a kind of dictionary that describes information in a certain domain using concepts and relationships. It is often implemented using OWL (Web Ontology Language), an XML-based standard language that can be interpreted by computers.

- A Concept is defined as abstract knowledge. For example, in the geopolitical ontology a non-self-governing territory and a geographical group are concepts. Concepts are explicitly implemented in the ontology with individuals and classes:
  - An individual is defined as an object perceived from the real world. In the geopolitical domain Ethiopia and the least developed countries group are individuals.
  - A class is defined as a set of individuals sharing common properties. In the geopolitical domain, Ethiopia, Republic of Korea and Italy are individuals of the class self-governing territory; and least developed countries is an individual of the class special group.
- Relationships between concepts are explicitly implemented by:
  - Object properties between individuals of two classes. For example, has member and is in group properties, as shown in Figure 1.
  - Datatype properties between individuals and literals or XML datatypes. For example, the individual Afghanistan has the datatype property CodeISO3 with the value "AFG".
  - Restrictions in classes and/or properties. For example, the property official English name of the class self-governing territory has been restricted to have only one value, this means that a self-governing territory (or country) can only have one internationally recognized official English name.

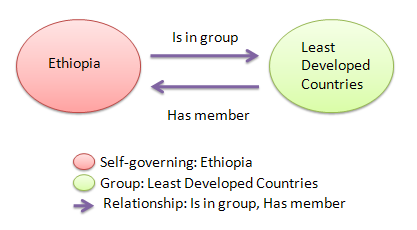
Figure 1. An example of concepts and relationship in the geopolitical ontology.

The advantage of describing information in an ontology is that it enables to acquire domain knowledge by defining hierarchical structures of classes, adding individuals, setting object properties and datatype properties, and assigning restrictions.

== FAO ontology ==
The geopolitical ontology provides names in seven languages (Arabic, Chinese, French, English, Spanish, Russian and Italian) and identifiers in various international coding systems (ISO2, ISO3, AGROVOC, FAOSTAT, FAOTERM, GAUL, UN, UNDP and DBPediaID codes) for territories and groups. Moreover, the FAO geopolitical ontology tracks historical changes from 1985 up until today; provides geolocation (geographical coordinates); implements relationships among countries and countries, or countries and groups, including properties such as has border with, is predecessor of, is successor of, is administered by, has members, and is in group; and disseminates country statistics including country area, land area, agricultural area, GDP or population.

The FAO geopolitical ontology provides a structured description of data sources. This includes: source name, source identifier, source creator and source's update date. Concepts are described using the Dublin Core vocabulary

In summary, the main objectives of the FAO geopolitical ontology are:

- To provide the most updated geopolitical information (names, codes, relationships, statistics)
- To track historical changes in geopolitical information
- To improve information management and facilitate standardized data sharing of geopolitical information
- To demonstrate the benefits of the geopolitical ontology to improve interoperability of corporate information systems

It is possible to download the FAO geopolitical ontology in OWL and RDF formats. Documentation is available in the FAO Country Profiles Geopolitical information web page.

== Features of the FAO ontology ==
The geopolitical ontology contains :

- Area types:
  - Territories: self-governing, non-self-governing, disputed, other.
  - Groups: organizations, geographic, economic and special groups.
- Names (official, short and names for lists) in Arabic, Chinese, English, French, Spanish, Russian and Italian.
- International codes: UN code – M49, ISO 3166 Alpha-2 and Alpha-3, UNDP code, GAUL code, FAOSTAT, AGROVOC FAOTERM and DBPediaID.
- Coordinates: maximum latitude, minimum latitude, maximum longitude, minimum longitude.
- Basic country statistics: country area, land area, agricultural area, GDP, population.
- Currency names and codes.
- Adjectives of nationality.
- Relations:
  - Groups membership.
  - Neighbours (land border), administration of non-self-governing.
  - Historic changes: predecessor, successor, valid since, valid until.

== Implementation into OWL ==
The FAO geopolitical ontology is implemented in OWL. It consists of classes, properties, individuals and restrictions. Table 1 shows all classes, gives a brief description and lists some individuals that belong to each class. Note that the current version of the geopolitical ontology does not provide individuals of the class "disputed" territories. Table 2 and Table 3 illustrate datatype properties and object properties.

== Geopolitical ontology in Linked Open Data ==
The FAO Geopolitical ontology is embracing the W3C Linked Open Data (LOD) initiative and released its RDF version of the geopolitical ontology in March 2011. The term 'Linked Open Data' refers to a set of best practices for publishing and connecting structured data on the Web. The key technologies that support Linked Data are URIs, HTTP and RDF.

The RDF version of the geopolitical ontology is compliant with all Linked data principles to be included in the Linked Open Data cloud, as explained in the following.

== Resolvable http:// URIs ==
Every resource in the OWL format of the FAO Geopolitical Ontology has a unique URI. Dereferenciation was implemented to allow for three different URIs to be assigned to each resource as follows:

- URI identifying the non-information resource
- Information resource with an RDF/XML representation
- Information resource with an HTML representation

In addition the current URIs used for OWL format needed to be kept to allow for backwards compatibility for other systems that are using them. Therefore, the new URIs for the FAO Geopolitical Ontology in LOD were carefully created, using “Cool URIs for Semantic Web” and considering other good practices for URIs, such as DBpedia URIs.

== New URIs ==
The URIs of the geopolitical ontology need to be permanent, consequently all transient information, such as year, version, or format was avoided in the definition of the URIs. The new URIs can be accessed

For example, for the resource “Italy” the URIs are the following:

http://www.fao.org/countryprofiles/geoinfo/geopolitical/resource/Italy
identifies the non-information resource.
http://www.fao.org/countryprofiles/geoinfo/geopolitical/data/Italy
identifies the resource with an RDF/XML representation.
http://www.fao.org/countryprofiles/geoinfo/geopolitical/page/Italy
identifies the information resource with an HTML representation.

In addition, “owl:sameAs” is used to map the new URIs to the OWL representation.

== Dereferencing URIs ==
When a non-information resource is looked up without any specific representation format, then the server needs to redirect the request to information resource with an HTML representation. For example, to retrieve the resource “Italy”, which is a non-information resource, the server redirects to the HTML page of “Italy”.

== At least 1000 triples in the datasets ==
The total number of triple statements in FAO Geopolitical Ontology is 22,495. At least 50 links to a dataset already in the current LOD Cloud: FAO Geopolitical Ontology has 195 links to DBpedia, which is already part of the LOD Cloud.

== Access to the entire dataset ==
FAO Geopolitical Ontology provides the entire dataset as a RDF dump.

The RDF version of the FAO Geopolitical Ontology has been already registered in CKAN and it was requested to add it into the LOD Cloud.

== Example of use ==
Figure 3. a website of introducing the geopolitical ontology in FAO Country Profiles.

The FAO Country Profiles is an information retrieval tool which groups the FAO's vast archive of information on its global activities in agriculture and rural development in one single area and catalogues it exclusively by country.

The FAO Country Profiles system provides access to country-based heterogeneous data sources. By using the geopolitical ontology in the system, the following benefits are expected:

- Enhanced system functionality for content aggregation and synchronization from the multiple source repositories.
- Improved information access and browsing through comparison of data in neighbor countries and groups.

Figure 3 shows a page in the FAO Country Profiles where the geopolitical ontology is described.

== See also ==
- Agricultural Information Management Standards
- AGROVOC
- Country code
- FAO Country Profiles
- Global Administrative Unit Layers (GAUL)
- International Organization for Standardization (ISO)
