= Energy-Safety and Energy-Economy =

- Discipline: Engineering
- Language: Russian, English
- Edited by: Svetlana Zernes

Publication details
- Former names: Energy Safety in Documents and Facts Journal
- History: 2005–present
- Publisher: Moscow Institute of Energy-Safety and Energy-Economy (Russia)
- Frequency: Bimonthly

Standard abbreviations
- ISO 4: Energy-Saf. Energy-Econ.

Indexing
- ISSN: 2071-2219

Links
- Journal homepage in English; Journal homepage in Russian

Energy-Safety and Energy-Economy (Russian: Энергобезопа́сность и энергосбереже́ние) is a peer-reviewed scientific and technical journal covering energy safety and economy, safety regulations, personnel training, innovation, and recent trends in alternative power sources research. The editor-in-chief is Svetlana Zernes (Moscow Institute of Energy Safety and Energy Economy). It was established in 2005 as Energy Safety in Documents and Facts Journal, obtaining its current title in 2008.

The journal is included in AGRIS, Ulrich's Periodicals Directory, the Higher Attestation Commission's official list, EBSCO, Russian Science Citation Index, Global Impact Factor, Research Bible, SHERPA/RoMEO, WorldCat, Open Academic Journals Index (OAJI) and VINITI Database RAS.

In addition to bimonthly issues, Energy-Safety and Energy-Economy publishes a quarterly appendix.

== Awards ==
Energy-Safety and Energy-Economy is a winner of the National Ecological Prize, Russian Energy Olympus contest, Social and Economic Significant Projects in Education, Culture and Ecology contest, Save Energy contest, and others.
