= Marketing MBA =

- Discipline: Marketing management
- Language: Russian
- Edited by: Roman R. Sidorchuk

Publication details
- History: 2010-present
- Publisher: Green Mall Publications (Russia)
- Frequency: Triannually

Standard abbreviations
- ISO 4: Mark. MBA

Indexing
- ISSN: 2078-6921

Links
- Journal homepage; Online access

Marketing MBA is a triannual peer-reviewed academic journal that covers research on marketing management firms and education in marketing. The editor-in-chief is Roman R. Sidorchuk (Plekhanov Russian Economic University). It was established in 2010 and is currently published by Green Mall Publications.

== Abstracting and indexing ==
The journal is abstracted and indexed in RePEc and the Russian Science Citation Index.
