= List of countries by cereal production =

World map of cereal production in tonnes (FAO data)

This is a list of countries by cereal production in 2023 based on the Food and Agriculture Organization Corporate Statistical Database. The total world cereal production for 2023 was over three billion metric tons. The per-capita world cereal production for that year was about or nearly 400 kilograms per person.

The countries with the highest production of cereals include China, the United States, India, Brazil, Russia, Argentina and Canada. The countries with the highest per capita production of cereals include Lithuania, Argentina, Hungary, Canada, Serbia, Latvia and Denmark. In 1961, the total cereal production was nearly 877 million tons.

== Production by country ==
The table shows the countries with the largest production of cereals (barley, oats, millet, sorghum, corn, rice, rye and wheat).

| Rank | Country/Region | Cereal production (in thousands tons) | Production per capita (in kg per person) |
|---|---|---|---|
| 1 | China | 658,000 | 460 |
| 2 | United States | 478,000 | 1,400 |
| 3 | India | 382,000 | 270 |
| 4 | Brazil | 156,000 | 710 |
| 5 | Russia | 149,000 | 1,000 |
| 6 | Argentina | 101,000 | 2,200 |
| 7 | Canada | 72,100 | 1,900 |
| 8 | Indonesia | 65,900 | 230 |
| 9 | France | 62,500 | 940 |
| 10 | Ukraine | 61,000 | 1,500 |
| 11 | Bangladesh | 59,800 | 350 |
| 12 | Vietnam | 50,300 | 440 |
| 13 | Germany | 49,100 | 600 |
| 14 | Pakistan | 48,700 | 210 |
| 15 | Turkey | 46,800 | 530 |
| 16 | Mexico | 42,400 | 320 |
| 17 | Thailand | 41,700 | 590 |
| 18 | Poland | 39,900 | 1,100 |
| 19 | Ethiopia | 34,200 | 270 |
| 20 | Nigeria | 32,100 | 140 |
| 21 | Myanmar | 31,300 | 560 |
| 22 | Australia | 29,900 | 1,100 |
| 23 | Philippines | 28,300 | 250 |
| 24 | Spain | 27,100 | 600 |
| 25 | Egypt | 26,900 | 240 |
| 26 | Iran | 24,700 | 280 |
| 27 | Kazakhstan | 22,600 | 1,300 |
| 28 | Romania | 20,200 | 1,100 |
| 29 | Italy | 19,900 | 330 |
| 30 | Hungary | 19,300 | 2,000 |
| 31 | South Africa | 18,100 | 290 |
| 32 | United Kingdom | 17,300 | 260 |
| 33 | Tanzania | 16,200 | 260 |
| 34 | Japan | 15,100 | 120 |
| 35 | Cambodia | 14,900 | 880 |
| 36 | Serbia | 12,500 | 1,900 |
| 37 | Nepal | 11,700 | 380 |
| 38 | Mali | 10,200 | 460 |
One million to ten million tons
| 39 | Denmark | 9,930 | 1,700 |
| 40 | Iraq | 8,930 | 190 |
| 41 | Bulgaria | 8,740 | 1,400 |
| 42 | Paraguay | 8,630 | 1,300 |
| 43 | Belarus | 8,370 | 910 |
| 44 | Czech Republic | 8,210 | 800 |
| 45 | Uzbekistan | 7,980 | 460 |
| 46 | Lithuania | 7,260 | 2,700 |
| 47 | Afghanistan | 6,410 | 150 |
| 48 | Sweden | 6,320 | 600 |
| 49 | Niger | 6,140 | 230 |
| 50 | Austria | 6,020 | 660 |
| 51 | Sri Lanka | 5,990 | 380 |
| 52 | Peru | 5,890 | 250 |
| 53 | Syria | 5,670 | 250 |
| 54 | Burkina Faso | 5,530 | 230 |
| 55 | South Korea | 5,320 | 100 |
| 56 | Algeria | 5,210 | 120 |
| 57 | Kenya | 5,110 | 95 |
| 58 | Laos | 5,010 | 620 |
| 59 | Guinea | 4,990 | 340 |
| 60 | North Korea | 4,890 | 190 |
| 61 | Ghana | 4,790 | 140 |
| 62 | Sudan | 4,720 | 83 |
| 63 | Slovakia | 4,690 | 890 |
| 64 | Madagascar | 4,530 | 170 |
| 65 | Finland | 4,460 | 800 |
| 66 | Malawi | 4,390 | 150 |
| 67 | Colombia | 4,220 | 80 |
| 68 | Croatia | 4,110 | 1,100 |
| 69 | Cameroon | 3,990 | 130 |
| 70 | Zambia | 3,920 | 190 |
| 71 | Senegal | 3,880 | 210 |
| 72 | Democratic Republic of the Congo | 3,790 | 38 |
| 73 | Uruguay | 3,690 | 1,000 |
| 74 | Latvia | 3,580 | 1,900 |
| 75 | Uganda | 3,490 | 76 |
| 76 | Morocco | 3,320 | 98 |
| 77 | Azerbaijan | 3,290 | 320 |
| 78 | Greece | 3,220 | 300 |
| 79 | Bolivia | 3,110 | 250 |
| 80 | Chad | 3,010 | 180 |
| 81 | Ivory Coast | 2,990 | 110 |
| 82 | Chile | 2,870 | 150 |
| 83 | Ecuador | 2,790 | 110 |
| 84 | Belgium | 2,690 | 250 |
| 85 | Angola | 2,620 | 140 |
| 86 | Malaysia | 2,570 | 74 |
| 87 | Benin | 2,480 | 180 |
| 100 | Netherlands | 2,440 | 120 |
| 89 | Venezuela | 2,390 | 86 |
| 90 | Taiwan | 2,220 | 94 |
| 91 | Guatemala | 2,170 | 120 |
| 92 | Mozambique | 2,120 | 64 |
| 93 | Bosnia and Herzegovina | 2,080 | 640 |
| 94 | Kyrgyzstan | 2,010 | 280 |
| 95 | Ireland | 1,990 | 390 |
| 96 | Estonia | 1,790 | 1,400 |
| 97 | Zimbabwe | 1,690 | 100 |
| 98 | Tunisia | 1,590 | 120 |
| 99 | Turkmenistan | 1,530 | 230 |
| 100 | Moldova | 1,490 | 360 |
| 101 | Togo | 1,410 | 160 |
| 102 | Norway | 1,380 | 250 |
| 103 | Tajikistan | 1,270 | 120 |
| 104 | Saudi Arabia | 1,230 | 33 |
| 105 | Sierra Leone | 1,110 | 130 |
| 106 | Portugal | 1,090 | 110 |
| 107 | El Salvador | 1,040 | 160 |
| 108 | New Zealand | 1,030 | 200 |
| 109 | Israel | 1,020 | 110 |
| 110 | Switzerland | 1,010 | 120 |
100,000 to a million tons
| 111 | Dominican Republic | 995 | 88 |
| 112 | Nicaragua | 947 | 130 |
| 113 | South Sudan | 883 | 79 |
| 114 | Rwanda | 833 | 60 |
| 115 | Honduras | 811 | 74 |
| 116 | Slovenia | 774 | 360 |
| 117 | Guyana | 722 | 880 |
| 118 | Albania | 692 | 250 |
| 119 | North Macedonia | 622 | 310 |
| 120 | Panama | 599 | 130 |
| 121 | Cuba | 577 | 53 |
| 122 | Mauritania | 533 | 110 |
| 123 | Burundi | 511 | 38 |
| 124 | Yemen | 498 | 15 |
| 125 | Mongolia | 433 | 120 |
| 126 | Georgia | 422 | 39 |
| 127 | Haiti | 389 | 33 |
| 128 | Eritrea | 379 | 100 |
| 129 | Suriname | 355 | 570 |
| 130 | Liberia | 271 | 50 |
| 131 | Guinea-Bissau | 233 | 110 |
| 132 | Armenia | 229 | 83 |
| 133 | Libya | 211 | 30 |
| 134 | Oman | 201 | 44 |
| 135 | Somalia | 198 | 11 |
| 136 | Lebanon | 188 | 36 |
| 137 | Namibia | 172 | 66 |
| 138 | Gambia | 171 | 62 |
| 139 | Botswana | 165 | 61 |
| 140 | Costa Rica | 156 | 29 |
| 141 | Luxembourg | 151 | 220 |
| 142 | Timor-Leste | 149 | 110 |
| 143 | Central African Republic | 143 | 25 |
| 144 | Belize | 133 | 310 |
| 145 | Bhutan | 112 | 140 |
1,000–100,000 tons
| 146 | Lesotho | 99 | 41 |
| 147 | Jordan | 96 | 8.4 |
| 148 | Eswatini | 93 | 13 |
| 149 | Cyprus | 80 | 64 |
| 150 | Palestine | 53 | 10 |
| 151 | Gabon | 51 | 20 |
| 152 | Comoros | 42 | 49 |
| 153 | Republic of the Congo | 38 | 6.2 |
| 154 | Kuwait | 25 | 6 |
| 155 | Papua New Guinea | 22 | 2.3 |
| 156 | United Arab Emirates | 17 | 1.7 |
| 157 | New Caledonia | 12 | 46 |
| 158 | Fiji | 9.95 | 11 |
| 159 | Iceland | 7.72 | 20 |
| 160 | Montenegro | 7.25 | 12 |
| 161 | Trinidad and Tobago | 6.32 | 3.9 |
| 162 | Solomon Islands | 3.33 | 4.4 |
| 163 | Brunei | 2.79 | 6.1 |
| 164 | Jamaica | 2.33 | 0.82 |
| 165 | Qatar | 1.95 | 0.72 |
<1,000 tons
| 166 | Vanuatu | 0.984 | 2.9 |
| 167 | Saint Vincent and the Grenadines | 0.963 | 9.6 |
| 168 | Mauritius | 0.863 | 0.69 |
| 169 | São Tomé and Príncipe | 0.793 | 3.4 |
| 170 | Bahamas | 0.732 | 1.7 |
| 171 | Cape Verde | 0.688 | 1.1 |
| 172 | Grenada | 0.466 | 3.6 |
| 173 | Federated States of Micronesia | 0.336 | 2.9 |
| 174 | Maldives | 0.238 | 0.45 |
| 175 | Dominica | 0.211 | 2.9 |
| 176 | Puerto Rico | 0.189 | 0.061 |
| 177 | Djibouti | 0.023 | 0.02 |
| 178 | Barbados | 0.018 | 0.064 |
| 179 | Antigua and Barbuda | 0.016 | 0.17 |

== World production ==
World production in tons.

| Year | Production (in billions of tons) |
|---|---|
| 1961 | 0.877 |
| 1962 | 0.933 |
| 1963 | 0.949 |
| 1964 | 1.000 |
| 1965 | 0.999 |
| 1966 | 1.080 |
| 1967 | 1.120 |
| 1968 | 1.160 |
| 1969 | 1.170 |
| 1970 | 1.190 |

| Year | Production (in billions of tons) |
|---|---|
| 1971 | 1.30 |
| 1972 | 1.26 |
| 1973 | 1.36 |
| 1974 | 1.33 |
| 1975 | 1.36 |
| 1976 | 1.46 |
| 1977 | 1.46 |
| 1978 | 1.58 |
| 1979 | 1.54 |
| 1980 | 1.55 |

| Year | Production (in billions of tons) |
|---|---|
| 1981 | 1.63 |
| 1982 | 1.69 |
| 1983 | 1.63 |
| 1984 | 1.79 |
| 1985 | 1.82 |
| 1986 | 1.83 |
| 1987 | 1.77 |
| 1988 | 1.73 |
| 1989 | 1.87 |
| 1990 | 1.95 |

| Year | Production (in billions of tons) |
|---|---|
| 1991 | 1.89 |
| 1992 | 1.97 |
| 1993 | 1.90 |
| 1994 | 1.95 |
| 1995 | 1.90 |
| 1996 | 2.06 |
| 1997 | 2.10 |
| 1998 | 2.09 |
| 1999 | 2.08 |
| 2000 | 2.06 |

| Year | Production (in billions of tons) |
|---|---|
| 2001 | 2.10 |
| 2002 | 2.05 |
| 2003 | 2.07 |
| 2004 | 2.29 |
| 2005 | 2.27 |
| 2006 | 2.26 |
| 2007 | 2.35 |
| 2008 | 2.52 |
| 2009 | 2.49 |
| 2010 | 2.46 |

| Year | Production (in billions of tons) |
|---|---|
| 2011 | 2.58 |
| 2012 | 2.56 |
| 2013 | 2.76 |
| 2014 | 2.81 |
| 2015 | 2.83 |
| 2016 | 2.91 |
| 2017 | 2.96 |
| 2018 | 2.91 |
| 2019 | 2.96 |
| 2020 | 3.00 |
