= List of countries by cherry production =

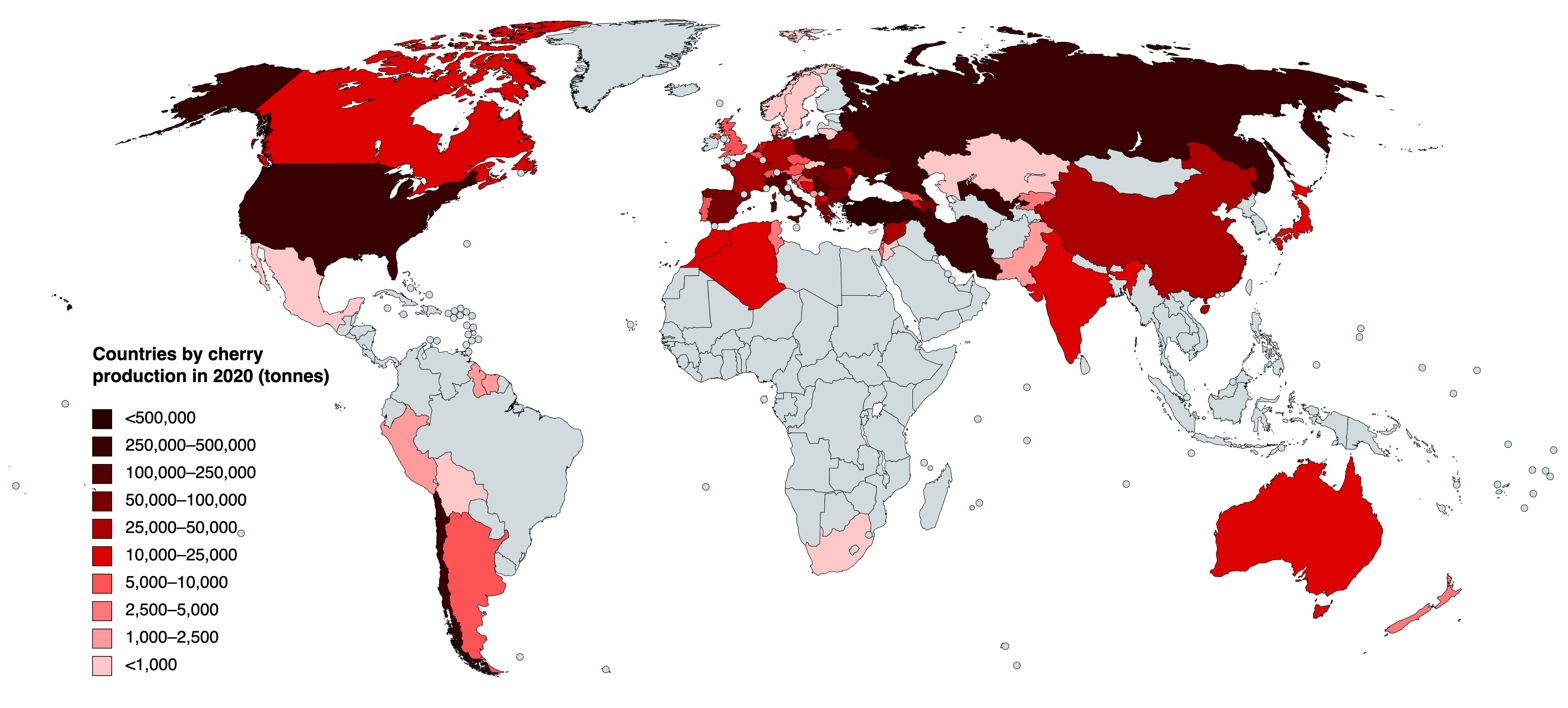
Countries by cherry production in 2020

This is a list of countries by cherry production measured in metric tonnes from the years 2016 to 2022, based on data from the Food and Agriculture Organization Corporate Statistical Database. (Note: Includes both sweet and sour cherries.) The estimated total world production for 2022 was 4,358,852 metric tonnes, increasing by 1.9% from 4,277,298 tonnes in 2021.

Turkey was the largest producer of cherries, accounting for over 19% of global production.

== Production by country ==
Country	2022	2021	2020	2019	2018	2017	2016
Turkey	832,811	873,591	914,128	846,389	823,731	809,006	792,150
Chile	443,661	386,300	276,300	270,300	228,300	120,229	155,275
Russia	356,600	332,000	305,800	292,300	278,600	223,800	264,000
United States	320,960	423,790	358,430	438,167	447,740	514,640	460,878
Uzbekistan	297,676	286,885	255,718	240,884	228,700	193,678	165,472
Poland	260,400	225,700	206,800	196,360	260,590	91,264	248,590
Iran	239,445	249,631	271,107	253,161	213,713	248,986	244,847
Ukraine	238,420	255,570	238,180	236,130	303,340	243,130	219,770
Serbia	187,393	171,000	180,699	114,104	147,176	118,982	117,466
Spain	116,610	126,490	82,720	118,760	107,000	114,803	100,933
Italy	109,040	93,300	104,380	98,600	114,800	125,845	102,462
Greece	86,170	81,660	94,370	82,190	90,290	82,041	84,944
Hungary	77,470	69,380	70,070	73,170	95,590	80,308	84,251
Romania	71,620	83,170	66,610	73,400	82,560	92,784	111,804
Syria	71,546	44,343	42,206	66,039	61,117	68,106	76,268
Azerbaijan	59,185	55,526	55,756	51,873	49,915	46,370	44,692
Bulgaria	58,180	57,030	57,140	60,110	60,100	52,497	42,042
Germany	48,660	38,370	49,990	60,270	60,120	24,803	45,342
Albania	41,899	39,580	38,074	37,174	36,704	36,990	36,426
France	37,090	16,190	34,680	32,810	32,240	43,204	37,965
Belarus	36,723	46,043	59,137	30,486	42,550	11,624	40,940
China	35,731	35,746	35,891	35,555	35,793	36,325	34,547
Bosnia and Herzegovina	33,597	14,548	16,766	13,623	17,822	12,531	14,926
Lebanon	28,314	33,684	32,533	34,244	36,765	44,795	32,432
Portugal	24,870	24,160	9,420	22,220	17,570	19,752	17,550
Canada	22,092	19,946	21,378	25,748	29,998	31,893	25,096
Moldova	21,500	19,300	20,019	20,436	20,119	15,635	11,719
Australia	18,818	21,310	14,475	15,941	15,964	11,532	18,374
Japan	16,100	13,100	17,200	16,100	18,100	19,100	19,800
Morocco	15,915	13,804	10,767	20,349	13,664	13,406	8,093
North Macedonia	14,493	13,088	16,150	14,740	16,362	8,469	13,646
Armenia	13,988	12,366	13,673	15,970	17,254	12,541	15,877
Algeria	11,159	11,178	11,207	11,237	8,818	9,193	6,903
India	10,934	11,014	10,918	10,871	10,159	10,289	10,497
Netherlands	10,537	10,635	11,800	11,780	12,300	4,608	4,541
Belgium	9,163	4,063	6,470	10,120	6,030	6,420	7,247
Austria	8,260	6,840	7,380	8,270	11,990	6,125	3,959
Croatia	8,180	6,160	7,310	6,860	9,410	10,206	9,309
Argentina	7,388	7,353	7,318	7,333	7,308	7,246	7,176
Georgia	7,100	6,900	5,400	3,000	4,400	2,100	3,700
Czech Republic	6,280	6,330	6,740	7,990	9,520	6,201	9,213
Switzerland	5,609	3,873	8,780	10,184	11,391	4,498	5,685
Kyrgyzstan	4,641	4,614	4,647	4,661	4,536	4,743	4,463
Tunisia	4,419	4,463	4,507	4,668	4,536	4,354	4,591
United Kingdom	4,091	3,795	5,647	5,745	3,568	6,484	1,700
Israel	4,001	2,002	3,702	3,503	3,001	4,000	3,500
New Zealand	3,663	3,177	3,206	2,820	3,750	2,337	2,425
Pakistan	2,762	2,753	2,442	2,366	2,096	2,067	2,140
Guyana	2,323	2,150	2,175	2,236	2,359	2,701	2,210
Montenegro	2,091	2,086	2,080	2,080	2,078	2,078	2,071
Suriname	1,883	1,807	1,347	1,241	1,256	916	902
Slovenia	1,790	190	2,040	750	1,280	1,265	4,118
Denmark	1,750	1,950	2,130	3,650	3,840	4,193	3,650
South Africa	1,726	1,132	836	524	410	245	425
Peru	1,301	1,236	1,440	1,568	1,364	1,304	1,229
Norway	1,125	899	643	693	956	623	686
Palestine	1,088	768	1,186	1,105	1,143	1,178	1,157
Jordan	1,063	1,060	770	952	881	968	1,228
Bolivia	975	971	966	986	964	957	941
Slovakia	680	–	20	690	930	916	632
Kazakhstan	537	690	697	692	713	906	919
Cyprus	–	387	375	353	342	391	399
Mexico	188	156	144	92	178	72	207
Sweden	180	180	210	90	90	100	100
Lithuania	20	21	640	380	620	1,081	1,864
Luxembourg	20	10	10	10	10	–	11
