= List of countries by papaya production =

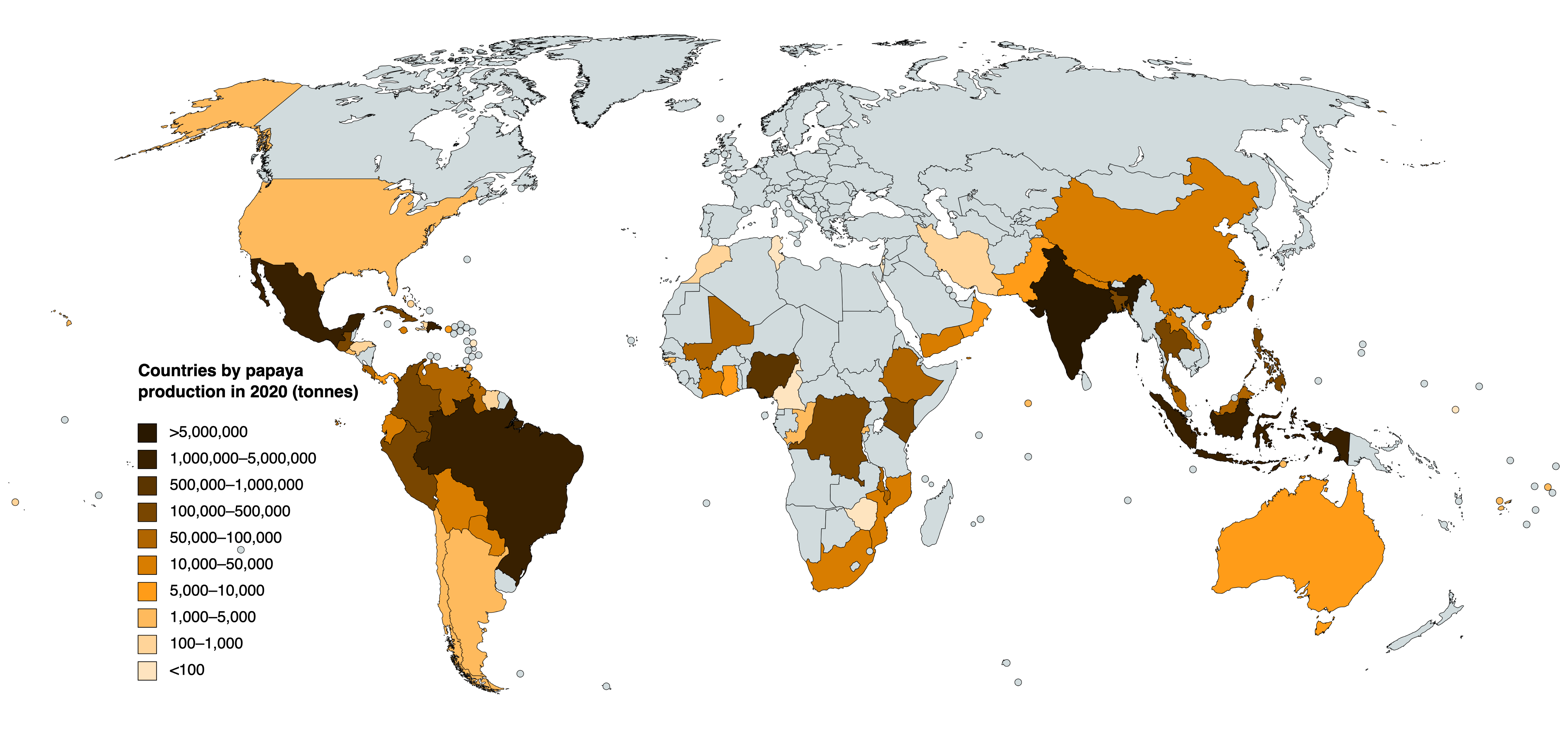
Countries by papaya production in 2020

This is a list of countries by papaya production from 2017 to 2022, based on data from the Food and Agriculture Organization Corporate Statistical Database. The estimated total world production for papayas in 2022 was 13,822,328 metric tonnes, down by 1.9% from 14,086,181 tonnes in 2021. India was by far the largest producer, accounting for over 38% of global production. Dependent territories are shown in italics.

== Production by country ==
=== >100,000 tonnes ===
| Rank | Country/region | 2022 | 2021 | 2020 | 2019 | 2018 | 2017 |
|---|---|---|---|---|---|---|---|
| 1 | India | 5,341,000 | 5,540,000 | 5,780,000 | 6,050,000 | 5,989,000 | 5,940,000 |
| 2 | Dominican Republic | 1,281,726 | 1,156,667 | 1,094,495 | 1,176,453 | 1,026,619 | 869,306 |
| 3 | Mexico | 1,139,121 | 1,134,753 | 1,117,437 | 1,083,133 | 1,039,820 | 961,768 |
| 4 | Brazil | 1,107,761 | 1,259,684 | 1,234,639 | 1,171,026 | 1,065,421 | 1,058,487 |
| 5 | Indonesia | 1,089,578 | 1,168,266 | 1,016,388 | 986,991 | 887,580 | 875,112 |
| 6 | Nigeria | 877,009 | 866,682 | 886,752 | 877,594 | 835,701 | 838,172 |
| 7 | Democratic Republic of the Congo | 209,416 | 209,954 | 210,492 | 209,482 | 210,070 | 211,761 |
| 8 | China | 199,030 | 118,834 | 138,333 | 122,272 | 127,244 | 125,521 |
| 9 | Peru | 176,931 | 190,069 | 188,166 | 166,180 | 175,999 | 177,171 |
| 10 | Thailand | 165,605 | 165,666 | 165,580 | 165,570 | 165,847 | 165,322 |
| 11 | Philippines | 159,173 | 165,912 | 163,299 | 166,164 | 169,143 | 167,043 |
| 12 | Venezuela | 156,533 | 156,598 | 157,177 | 101,165 | 154,480 | 160,707 |
| 13 | Bangladesh | 147,350 | 125,758 | 130,679 | 135,809 | 131,598 | 134,647 |
| 14 | Taiwan | 138,333 | 122,272 | 127,244 | 125,521 | 105,921 | 5,667,000 |
| 15 | Colombia | 129,993 | 146,186 | 196,017 | 144,967 | 125,328 | 168,594 |
| 16 | Vietnam | 124,092 | 115,449 | 114,585 | 109,068 | 92,914 | 85,564 |

=== 1,000–100,000 tonnes ===
| Rank | Country/region | 2022 | 2021 | 2020 | 2019 | 2018 | 2017 |
|---|---|---|---|---|---|---|---|
| 17 | Guyana | 92,749 | 74,447 | 70,535 | 69,473 | 68,867 | 69,052 |
| 18 | Mali | 88,196 | 64,024 | 57,476 | 67,319 | 67,319 | 20,980 |
| 19 | Guatemala | 86,802 | 86,235 | 85,684 | 88,487 | 84,533 | 84,033 |
| 20 | Cuba | 82,200 | 82,203 | 158,231 | 187,821 | 176,630 | 189,086 |
| 21 | Kenya | 76,430 | 81,446 | 110,322 | 105,048 | 134,436 | 112,932 |
| 22 | Malawi | 70,151 | 67,900 | 66,892 | 64,573 | 62,896 | 59,670 |
| 23 | Costa Rica | 62,305 | 67,103 | 52,276 | 33,460 | 85,500 | 54,000 |
| 24 | Ethiopia | 60,938 | 60,665 | 72,008 | 51,947 | 59,205 | 54,355 |
| 25 | Malaysia | 54,753 | 60,844 | 61,776 | 53,681 | 52,917 | 83,797 |
| 26 | Ecuador | 48,872 | 48,690 | 50,473 | 47,452 | 48,145 | 48,472 |
| 27 | Mozambique | 43,159 | 43,076 | 42,993 | 43,067 | 43,033 | 42,968 |
| 28 | Haiti | 28,603 | 27,711 | 26,536 | 24,064 | 27,471 | 24,102 |
| 29 | Yemen | 27,206 | 27,373 | 24,845 | 24,502 | 19,884 | 21,735 |
| 30 | Laos | 26,690 | 32,092 | 29,053 | 29,990 | 27,365 | 25,295 |
| 31 | Panama | 22,915 | 19,432 | 15,785 | 12,768 | 8,059 | 7,835 |
| 32 | Nepal | 19,675 | 16,946 | 18,310 | 15,525 | 14,505 | 12,912 |
| 33 | Bolivia | 17,959 | 18,030 | 18,094 | 18,291 | 18,040 | 17,339 |
| 34 | Australia | 17,315 | 18,330 | 19,648 | 14,921 | 11,968 | 10,198 |
| 35 | Ivory Coast | 14,230 | 14,295 | 14,270 | 14,125 | 14,490 | 14,196 |
| 36 | Jamaica | 13,067 | 10,252 | 10,825 | 10,999 | 9,537 | 7,705 |
| 37 | Pakistan | 12,223 | 9,278 | 8,537 | 7,630 | 7,201 | 6,548 |
| 38 | Paraguay | 11,384 | 11,375 | 11,379 | 11,350 | 11,461 | 11,472 |
| 39 | South Africa | 8,330 | 9,398 | 10,555 | 13,134 | 12,909 | 13,739 |
| 40 | Puerto Rico | 7,694 | 7,563 | 7,759 | 6,496 | 4,710 | 7,210 |
| 41 | Oman | 5,851 | 5,838 | 5,830 | 5,830 | 5,572 | 5,772 |
| 42 | Ghana | 5,652 | 5,645 | 5,670 | 5,642 | 5,622 | 5,744 |
| 43 | Fiji | 5,210 | 4,509 | 3,635 | 4,005 | 3,285 | 3,434 |
| 44 | Saudi Arabia | 4,420 | 4,717 | 3,872 | | | |
| 45 | Republic of the Congo | 3,798 | 3,810 | 3,802 | 3,784 | 3,844 | 3,777 |
| 46 | United States | 3,790 | 6,080 | 3,760 | 5,330 | 4,720 | 11,610 |
| 47 | Samoa | 3,339 | 3,357 | 3,376 | 3,354 | 3,335 | 3,347 |
| 48 | Guinea-Bissau | 3,040 | 3,039 | 3,054 | 3,028 | 3,035 | 3,100 |
| 49 | El Salvador | 2,502 | 3,147 | 6,287 | 4,845 | 7,781 | 7,111 |
| 50 | Morocco | 2,280 | 2,280 | 2,250 | 2,270 | 2,028 | 1,713 |
| 51 | East Timor | 2,219 | 2,201 | 2,221 | 2,234 | 2,148 | 2,283 |
| 52 | Argentina | 2,214 | 2,212 | 2,200 | 2,214 | 2,217 | 2,213 |
| 53 | Chile | 2,143 | 2,211 | 2,180 | 2,413 | 2,241 | 2,511 |
| 54 | Israel | 1,909 | 1,609 | 83 | 101 | 44 | 60 |
| 55 | Rwanda | 1,547 | 1,308 | 2,278 | 2,211 | 623 | 1,662 |
| 56 | Trinidad and Tobago | 1,228 | 1,400 | 1,660 | 1,640 | 1,312 | 1,270 |

=== <1,000 tonnes ===
| Rank | Country/region | 2022 | 2021 | 2020 | 2019 | 2018 | 2017 |
|---|---|---|---|---|---|---|---|
| 57 | Cook Islands | 594 | 594 | 592 | 596 | 596 | 586 |
| 58 | Bahamas | 593 | 588 | 584 | 579 | 579 | 572 |
| 59 | Belize | 462 | 724 | 311 | 275 | 1,226 | 1,442 |
| 60 | Honduras | 359 | 348 | 341 | 388 | 316 | 318 |
| 61 | Iran | 297 | 297 | 299 | 296 | 295 | 306 |
| 62 | Suriname | 259 | 395 | 763 | 854 | 810 | 745 |
| 63 | Bhutan | 122 | 164 | 206 | 216 | 241 | 279 |
| 64 | Dominica | 91 | 90 | 90 | 90 | 88 | 87 |
| 65 | Tunisia | 77 | 76 | 75 | 74 | 73 | 73 |
| 66 | Maldives | 71 | 234 | 3,419 | 3,256 | 1,833 | 1,252 |
| 67 | Cameroon | 48 | 47 | 46 | 45 | 45 | 44 |
| 68 | Zimbabwe | 44 | 44 | 44 | 44 | 44 | 45 |
| 69 | Nauru | 2 | 2 | 2 | 2 | 2 | 0 |
