= List of countries by garlic production =

Countries based on garlic production

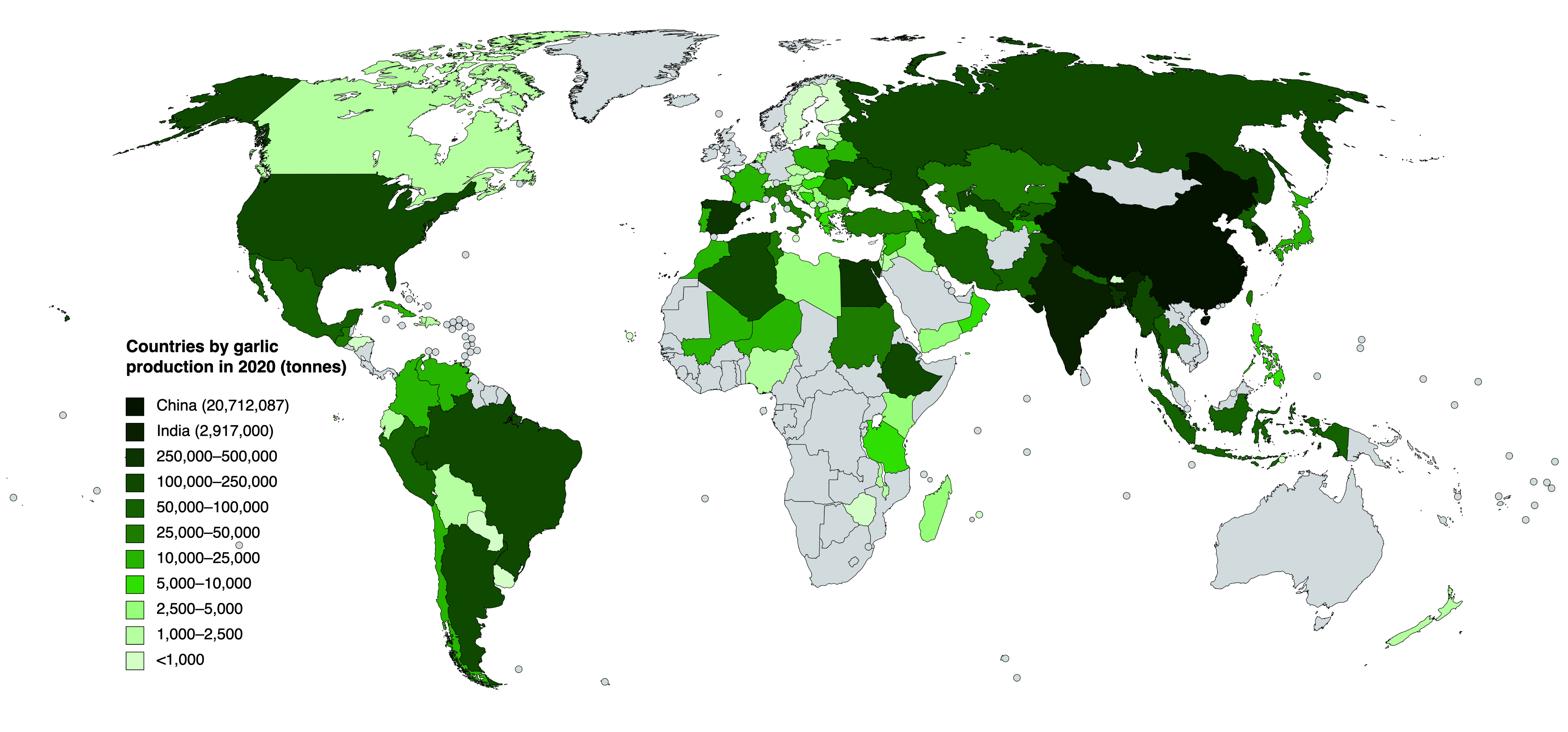
Countries by garlic production in 2020

This is a list of countries by garlic production from 2016 to 2022, based on data from the Food and Agriculture Organization Corporate Statistical Database. The total world production for garlic in 2022 was 29,149,438 metric tonnes, up slightly from 29,028,027 tonnes in 2021. China was by far the largest producer, accounting for 73% of world production at 21,337,798 tonnes.

== Production by country ==
=== >100,000 tonnes ===
Rank	Country/region	2022	2021	2020	2019	2018	2017	2016
1	China	21,337,798	21,157,080	21,457,871	21,398,441	20,614,927	20,051,869	20,281,659
2	India	3,208,000	3,190,000	2,925,000	2,910,000	1,611,000	1,693,000	1,617,000
3	Bangladesh	526,819	501,611	485,447	466,389	361,970	425,401	381,851
4	Egypt	396,478	445,712	377,100	363,460	348,700	289,766	272,769
5	Spain	281,900	315,720	269,090	271,350	273,480	274,712	209,795
6	South Korea	272,759	308,532	363,432	387,671	331,741	303,578	275,549
7	Ethiopia	218,807	193,900	114,945	152,595	195,740	178,222	138,664
8	Uzbekistan	210,348	195,467	223,719	216,272	254,857	214,263	200,869
9	United States	204,797	160,481	161,252	173,658	260,340	232,010	204,780
10	Myanmar	203,292	203,077	209,800	208,908	203,432	203,681	212,909
11	Algeria	202,060	195,976	170,930	223,311	202,201	123,475	103,627
12	Ukraine	188,980	215,080	211,680	215,070	187,020	185,830	187,960
13	Brazil	181,149	167,129	155,741	130,900	118,869	120,896	132,361
14	Argentina	154,685	153,872	153,059	154,086	151,173	149,534	148,852
15	Russia	147,744	148,904	189,659	202,064	211,981	206,074	202,992
16	Peru	113,573	109,562	90,717	82,991	104,703	94,887	78,205
17	Pakistan	107,986	127,463	85,642	75,342	81,167	75,002	70,925

=== 10,000–100,000 tonnes ===
Rank	Country/region	2022	2021	2020	2019	2018	2017	2016
18	Mexico	89,488	89,792	86,688	82,910	94,692	89,840	75,987
19	Kyrgyzstan	75,561	67,473	68,350	69,201	55,523	52,670	42,666
20	Nepal	74,763	73,490	73,859	71,902	59,500	56,668	50,426
21	North Korea	74,331	73,307	74,187	75,499	79,102	78,466	77,878
22	Thailand	62,565	75,444	76,839	84,039	90,982	69,180	67,554
23	Kazakhstan	61,894	52,165	49,222	49,125	44,881	38,831	33,481
24	Iran	59,927	59,605	59,282	60,051	60,058	59,709	59,169
25	Taiwan	53,543	55,887	51,634	47,464	60,075	43,738	44,497
26	Syria	50,344	59,755	53,654	49,140	46,460	46,472	24,701
27	Turkey	47,487	46,454	28,552	23,351	25,519	26,328	135,148
28	Indonesia	30,582	45,092	81,805	88,817	39,302	19,513	21,150
29	Guatemala	29,978	29,951	29,817	30,167	29,868	29,417	31,216
30	Sudan	28,416	29,682	26,788	28,778	33,480	18,108	34,745
31	Italy	27,870	28,660	27,970	29,270	30,500	29,983	29,568
32	Tunisia	25,426	25,146	24,974	26,159	24,303	24,461	24,736
33	Azerbaijan	24,165	24,706	26,214	39,118	44,914	21,541	21,114
34	Romania	22,500	30,130	31,560	27,700	30,570	55,673	54,389
35	Chile	21,647	24,965	27,200	20,843	19,600	19,168	15,692
36	Belarus	21,444	21,657	21,626	19,530	18,106	38,666	33,533
37	Japan	20,714	20,200	21,200	20,800	20,200	20,700	21,100
38	Poland	20,500	25,200	15,300	15,100	15,830		
39	France	19,430	28,820	30,280	28,140	20,120	20,464	21,932
40	Albania	19,039	18,521	20,722	15,056	13,696	14,544	12,308
41	Mali	18,101	14,940	14,945	14,956	14,921	13,199	9,955
42	Venezuela	14,679	14,711	13,819	12,113	14,895	14,599	13,906
43	Niger	14,358	15,157	12,312	7,449	4,937	4,260	3,761
44	Angola	13,075	11,187	11,136	11,006	12,667		
45	Tajikistan	11,494	9,914	17,429	16,459	15,643	5,896	3,255
46	Morocco	11,180	11,080	11,953	10,319	13,611	13,660	12,562
47	Cuba	10,689	11,313	12,094	19,400	17,320	19,462	23,257
48	Colombia	10,688	7,065	8,587	9,272	10,175	6,717	14,207

=== 1,000–10,000 tonnes ===
Rank	Country/region	2022	2021	2020	2019	2018	2017	2016
49	Moldova	8,300	7,800	7,382	7,124	9,510	11,522	10,166
50	Armenia	8,259	9,116	8,633	10,081	10,490	12,610	14,207
51	Greece	6,400	8,260	7,770	4,390	6,130	7,882	7,135
52	Portugal	6,200	14,220	12,250	410	2,040	2,660	2,622
53	Tanzania	6,186	6,145	6,208	6,204	6,024	6,398	6,190
54	Philippines	5,885	5,890	6,767	7,256	7,559	7,751	7,469
55	Hungary	5,480	5,610	5,210	7,120	7,930	7,430	7,899
56	Oman	5,207	4,433	5,103	2,501	2,477	2,915	2,914
57	Libya	4,842	4,760	4,700	4,700	4,660	4,626	4,578
58	Bosnia and Herzegovina	4,676	5,416	6,186	5,641	5,890	5,560	7,259
59	North Macedonia	4,440	4,373	4,904	4,515	4,134	4,214	4,221
60	Iraq	3,655	4,716	4,182	3,986	1,810	1,725	2,760
61	Kenya	3,486	3,713	3,860	2,175	1,726	2,493	2,372
62	Serbia	3,373	3,750	3,176	3,092	3,615	5,025	4,803
63	Yemen	3,248	3,209	3,265	3,270	3,223	3,292	3,339
64	Turkmenistan	3,143	3,155	3,146	3,127	3,192	3,118	3,072
65	Dominican Republic	3,023	1,503	2,124	1,951	1,517	1,524	2,368
66	Georgia	2,800	2,300	2,700	2,100	4,600	3,500	2,900
67	Lebanon	2,764	2,389	2,860	2,860	4,300	5,000	1,086
68	Madagascar	2,584	2,567	2,580	2,604	2,601	2,614	2,632
69	Bolivia	2,558	2,519	2,476	2,230	2,569	2,777	3,731
70	Jordan	2,317	2,476	2,099	2,506	3,689	2,589	2,267
71	Nigeria	2,250	2,154	2,208	1,276	1,800	2,300	2,300
72	Netherlands	2,170	2,120	2,540	2,470	2,390		
73	Canada	1,973	1,938	1,840	1,248	1,490	1,563	1,410
74	New Zealand	1,928	1,939	1,933	1,914	1,971	1,913	1,857
75	Mongolia	1,604	1,457	1,361	784			
76	Austria	1,470	1,440	1,320	1,210	1,120	1,091	1,025
77	Bulgaria	1,290	1,030	1,600	2,220	1,770	18	59
78	Ecuador	1,288	1,285	1,280	1,299	1,276	1,264	1,246
79	Slovakia	1,090	810	890	590	320	231	313
80	Czech Republic	1,030	1,580	2,020	1,640	1,690	1,340	835
81	Haiti	1,027	1,035	1,029	1,017	1,059	1,009	983

=== <1,000 tonnes ===
Rank	Country/region	2022	2021	2020	2019	2018	2017	2016
82	Croatia	970	2,870	1,970	2,880	1,730	1,901	1,444
83	Montenegro	946	945	951	941	944	967	913
84	Uruguay	885	872	904	878	835	1,000	800
85	Latvia	870	700	1,600	1,380	400	1,884	610
86	Malawi	743	655	1,035	645	521	230	
87	Slovenia	740	1,020	1,070	1,060	1,020	1,003	1,089
88	Palestine	699	469	807	870	944	1,033	1,098
89	Lithuania	670	930	1,020	970	860	970	1,622
90	Israel	670	653	1,169	1,449	1,361	1,486	2,183
91	Malta	480	470	540	540	580	358	479
92	Kuwait	458	421	490	623	432	280	351
93	Switzerland	396	142	175	58	51	42	34
94	East Timor	394	393	393	395	392	394	399
95	Estonia	300	150	210	130	130	356	185
96	Bhutan	297	240	691	761	550	708	1,176
97	Paraguay	218	240	236	234	230	230	225
98	Zimbabwe	212	213	212	210	217	209	205
99	Honduras	192	192	192	192	192	192	194
100	Cape Verde	86	86	87	87	84	89	87
101	Sweden	80	80	120	50	40		
102	Finland	50	110	110	70	10	75	141
103	Mauritius	49	31	39	48	71	96	120
