= Technosphera (publisher) =

Technosphera is a primary Russian scientific and technologic literature publisher. Since 1996, it has been publishing books and magazines about science and technology.

== Scientific literature ==
Technosphera publishes scientific literature of Russian and foreign authors on a wide range of topics and textbooks for students of higher technological education. Plenty of books are granted by methodical assemblies of higher education institutes. Technosphera's primary topics are mathematics, physics, chemistry, medicine, materials and technologies.

Technosphera's scientific monographs are regularly published with a support of the Russian fund of fundamental research.

In 2010 the book set World of Radioelectronics was established in collaboration with radioelectronics Department of Russian Ministry of Industry and Trade. The members of editorial team of this book set are the most advanced experts in radioelectronics.

== Technological and scientific magazines ==
Magazines of Technosphera are included in Russian Science Citation Index.

Electronics: Science, Technology, Business is a Russian magazine about research, technology and development in the electronic and radioelectronic industry. The magazine contains interviews with experts, reviews of the most interesting and useful exhibitions and articles about electronics and microelectronics.

Nanoindustry is a Russian scientific magazine focused on nanotechnology and nanomaterials, nanobiotechnologies and applied nanotechnologies in medicine.

Last Mile is a magazine that contains original articles and reviews about photonics and optics.

Analytics is the first Russian scientific magazine for experts in analytical chemistry with topics about analytic and laboratory equipment in Russia and CIS.
