= List of countries by cucumber production =

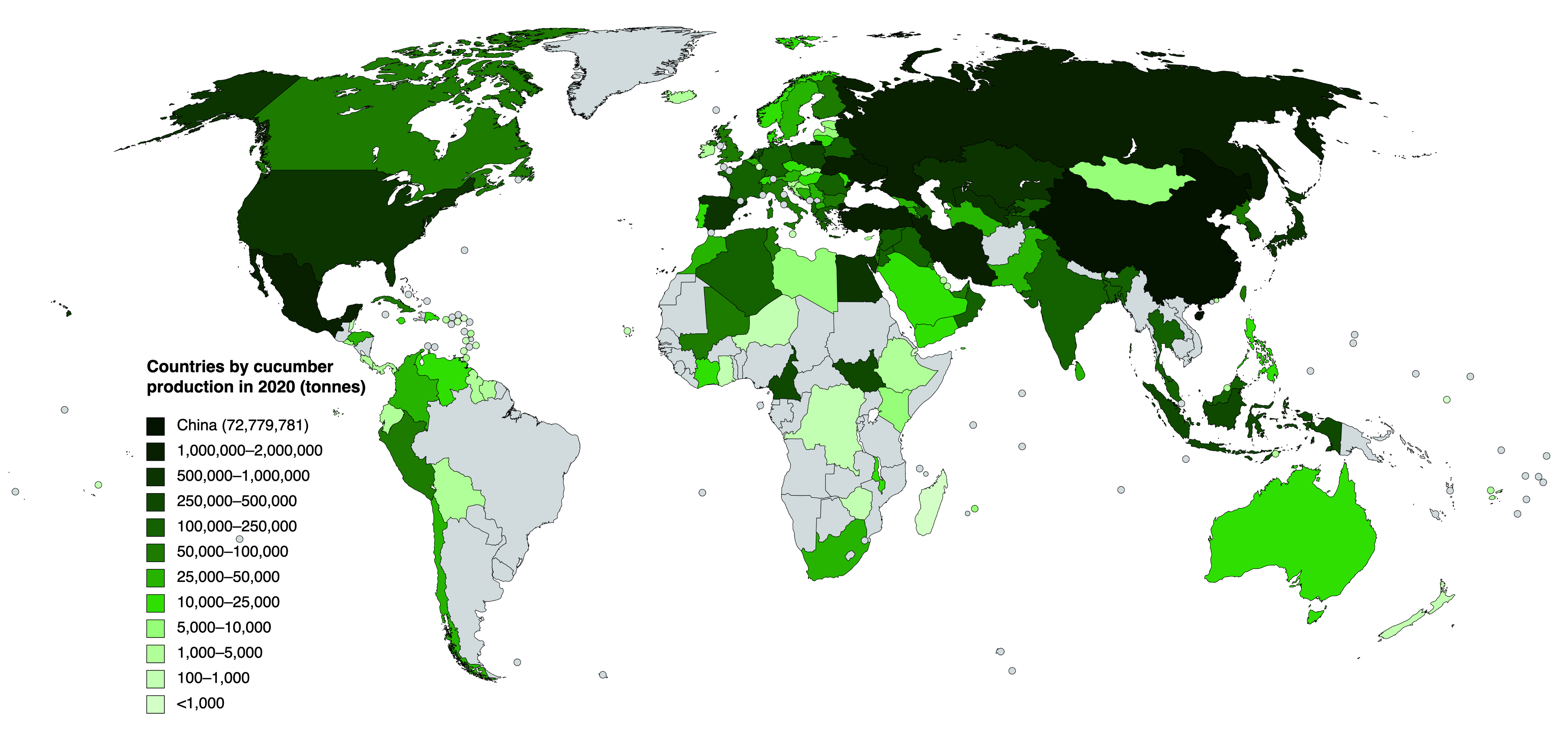
Countries by cucumber production in 2020

This is a list of countries by cucumber and gherkin production from the years 2017 to 2022, based on data from the Food and Agriculture Organization Corporate Statistical Database. The estimated total world production for cucumbers in 2022 was 94,718,397 metric tonnes, up 2.3% from 92,613,394 tonnes in 2021. China was by far the largest producer, accounting for just over 81% of global production at 77,258,256 tonnes. Dependent territories are shown in italics.

== Production by country ==
=== >500,000 tonnes ===
Rank	Country/region	2022	2021	2020	2019	2018	2017
1	China	77,258,256	74,815,093	72,927,969	70,388,971	67,601,863	65,156,963
2	Turkey	1,938,545	1,890,160	1,886,239	1,916,645	1,890,904	1,827,782
3	Russia	1,635,903	1,602,606	1,686,976	1,626,412	1,604,346	1,504,965
4	Mexico	1,078,210	1,038,999	1,159,934	1,191,608	1,072,048	956,005
5	Uzbekistan	904,390	890,433	812,728	855,058	857,076	813,591
6	Ukraine	825,590	1,079,960	1,012,530	1,034,170	985,120	896,280
7	Spain	769,970	745,910	794,880	739,200	643,660	634,824
8	United States	595,630	642,967	567,245	670,251	700,820	857,870
9	Kazakhstan	568,748	582,135	537,775	494,672	460,110	409,700
10	Japan	548,600	551,300	539,300	548,100	550,00	559,500

=== 100,000–500,000 tonnes ===
Rank	Country/region	2022	2021	2020	2019	2018	2017
11	Egypt	484,425	491,650	443,500	566,155	366,661	393,432
12	Poland	472,200	473,000	526,500	519,400	538,680	543,726
13	Indonesia	444,057	471,941	441,286	435,973	433,923	424,933
14	Iran	411,361	1483,092	571,441	667,359	650,882	751,160
15	Netherlands	400,130	440,440	430,170	410,250	410,410	400,000
16	South Korea	275,203	283,933	335,596	366,065	391,214	341,364
17	Cameroon	262,121	262,440	258,988	264,934	263,398	248,632
18	Tajikistan	257,203	283,344	262,556	235,747	211,612	178,035
19	Azerbaijan	246,572	245,847	226,929	248,891	223,790	220,903
20	Germany	233,710	242,800	216,970	249,920	267,590	256,689
21	Belarus	228,448	212,788	216,982	230,793	226,443	236,618
22	Sudan	227,043	226,749	224,103	230,277	225,866	216,166
23	Saudi Arabia	204,720	188,558	184,860	66,360	115,617	111,431
24	Iraq	195,924	185,484	242,614	149,302	138,353	96,664
25	Algeria	190,925	182,890	184,362	166,045	193,647	171,610
26	India	183,223	182,325	184,565	182,780	179,629	177,149
27	Thailand	177,068	176,479	177,052	177,672	174,712	178,773
28	France	175,180	200,150	213,540	139,140	137,850	145,981
29	Bangladesh	173,998	156,744	130,259	119,136	112,974	121,254
30	Jordan	173,682	131,301	141,383	163,484	208,226	190,847
31	Greece	142,490	155,800	158,510	149,740	155,480	142,289
32	Albania	129,896	118,171	113,685	126,632	120,351	110,210
33	Kyrgyzstan	126,811	129,159	129,122	130,007	119,569	118,282
34	Syria	125,495	151,844	182,415	136,567	175,758	185,208
35	Lebanon	123,685	121,005	120,090	128,710	124,480	110,147
36	United Arab Emirates	120,743	114,274	105,765	91,903	71,350	53,915
37	Pakistan	112,231	47,417	46,014	77,573	68,664	65,597
38	Palestine	112,014	117,938	107,120	110,050	113,870	103,133
39	Mali	105,876	83,957	98,751	72,944	79,031	68,882
40	Malaysia	102,369	96,353	101,482	103,363	85,134	88,492

=== 50,000–100,000 tonnes ===
Rank	Country/region	2022	2021	2020	2019	2018	2017
41	Oman	97,139	93,114	102,682	73,983	73,267	62,977
42	Israel	80,492	95,038	91,892	94,604	101,846	103,425
43	Kuwait	79,948	73,143	48,880	96,391	58,591	70,436
44	Cuba	79,185	80,232	81,712	95,700	106,708	148,497
45	Romania	77,830	149,990	165,070	118,630	138,610	201,001
46	Tunisia	70,111	70,085	70,266	69,982	70,008	70,808
47	North Korea	67,193	67,110	67,028	67,052	66,969	66,953
48	Morocco	63,155	59,851	46,416	57,448	47,787	48,735
49	Italy	61,830	62,950	60,690	60,600	54,090	54,444
50	Canada	60,721	57,720	57,655	65,416	57,295	62,204
51	Finland	56,960	60,030	59,910	56,130	55,330	50,763
52	Armenia	56,536	58,713	43,231	44,141	50,599	74,336
53	Bulgaria	52,270	53,680	53,630	72,970	74,350	54,398
54	Peru	50,559	55,012	52,106	45,448	44,288	47,668

=== 10,000–50,000 tonnes ===
Rank	Country/region	2022	2021	2020	2019	2018	2017
55	Australia	48,264	58,207	41,234	37,052	31,838	29,808
56	North Macedonia	48,190	52,950	49,112	51,019	54,314	51,532
57	Taiwan	47,083	47,975	51,331	48,968	51,224	51,264
58	United Kingdom	45,000	54,992	58,410	58,240	55,080	52,968
59	Honduras	44,314	45,000	47,000	40,000	38,428	35,827
60	Austria	44,110	47,740	46,330	45,270	44,850	46,581
61	Chile	37,429	37,353	37,174	37,759	37,126	36,637
62	Sri Lanka	37,142	39,097	42,229	39,044	49,767	33,128
63	Sweden	36,920	43,530	38,520	37,900	35,790	38,100
64	Colombia	36,790	34,114	28,424	40,982	38,742	33,664
65	Belgium	34,920	32,040	27,600	27,470	24,490	25,530
66	Turkmenistan	34,243	34,275	34,332	34,120	34,372	34,504
67	Serbia	30,751	29,177	31,281	29,711	42,539	57,957
68	South Africa	29,651	30,909	31,497	30,940	26,767	28,640
69	Georgia	26,000	30,300	32,800	30,400	33,000	23,000
70	Lithuania	23,250	22,980	19,560	22,370	16,140	19,232
71	Bosnia and Herzegovina	23,142	26,859	38,108	34,344	35,463	37,191
72	Hungary	22,940	26,050	24,620	26,680	29,770	33,690
73	Jamaica	22,012	21,293	19,431	18,742	19,216	18,387
74	Norway	21,709	21,650	21,188	19,065	17,462	16,484
75	Ivory Coast	20,740	20,756	20,771	20,565	20,184	20,002
76	Czechia	19,560	15,940	11,160	15,230	14,380	20,792
77	Qatar	18,224	21,848	28,375	24,923	17,612	11,992
78	Malawi	17,636	18,700	16,587	18,581	27,971	29,175
79	Moldova	16,100	30,200	23,699	44,583	23,020	21,644
80	Switzerland	16,067	15,314	14,543	12,904	13,511	14,394
81	Venezuela	15,704	17,278	15,414	11,345	14,485	16,460
82	Denmark	15,630	15,650	16,400	16,520	16,540	16,173
83	Kenya	14,404	5,344	5,925	4,708	3,609	6,686
84	Philippines	14,070	14,023	13,538	13,628	13,444	13,290
85	Yemen	13,815	13,837	13,845	13,762	13,903	13,870
86	Dominican Republic	13,071	13,504	13,676	16,625	16,212	15,579
87	Portugal	12,470	14,070	13,880	10,370	9,230	9,557
88	Croatia	11,370	8,550	7,020	3,000	4,420	10,622

=== 1,000–10,000 tonnes ===
Rank	Country/region	2022	2021	2020	2019	2018	2017
89	Latvia	8,140	7,600	7,900	7,250	6,300	7,321
90	El Salvador	7,657	12,979	5,467	7,104	2,297	4,901
91	Cyprus	7,650	7,860	7,970	8,060	9,660	8,303
92	Libya	7,164	9,592	8,600	7,410	7,430	8,670
93	Mongolia	7,003	6,161	6,054	4,707	3,761	3,922
94	Mauritius	5,938	5,615	3,716	6,131	7,840	8,377
95	Estonia	5,780	7,930	5,290	7,230	6,350	10,285
96	Panama	5,761	6,888	9,757	4,018	2,880	2,860
97	Bolivia	4,821	4,753	4,738	4,764	4,686	4,442
98	Ecuador	4,689	4,691	4,703	4,673	4,695	4,742
99	Slovakia	3,840	4,810	3,200	4,920	3,680	5,335
100	Bahrain	3,601	3,300	2,900	2,773	2,651	2,640
101	Guyana	3,358	3,145	2,817	2,916	2,981	2,922
102	Slovenia	2,630	2,330	2,990	2,410	2,450	2,425
103	Dominica	2,349	2,314	2,406	2,326	2,210	2,148
104	Comoros	2,268	2,187	2,106	2,025	1,944	1,863
105	Iceland	2,086	2,067	1,808	1,924	1,927	1,800
106	Hong Kong	1,960	1,953	1,946	1,961	1,966	1,949
107	Trinidad and Tobago	1,897	1,223	1,227	973	769	830
108	Ireland	1,790	1,760	1,850	1,730	1,650	1,649
109	Ethiopia	1,675	1,676	1,685	1,665	1,678	1,710
110	Costa Rica	1,651	1,653	1,651	1,648	1,660	1,644
111	Niger	1,593	1,648	872	458	73	1,047
112	Puerto Rico	1,298	1,283	1,302	1,103	838	1,224
113	Fiji	1,289	1,296	1,293	1,280	1,315	1,283
114	Barbados	1,246	424	676	933	677	715
115	East Timor	1,170	1,188	1,170	1,153	1,109	1,084
116	Brunei	1,141	1,347	1,514	1,740	1,985	2,301
117	Bhutan	1,126	1,994	1,970	2,691	2,215	1,948

=== <1,000 tonnes ===
Rank	Country/region	2022	2021	2020	2019	2018	2017
118	Saint Lucia	980	911	848	727	908	950
119	Cape Verde	890	889	884	1,411	1,135	1,470
120	Malta	820	690	740	810	770	807
121	Madagascar	629	629	629	630	627	629
122	French Polynesia	628	628	626	631	628	620
123	New Zealand	606	548	542	543	519	500
124	Grenada	595	886	795	1,071	1,115	937
125	Democratic Republic of Congo	376	375	373	379	372	369
126	Belize	272	464	378	219	341	472
127	Zimbabwe	226	220	232	240	240	240
128	Suriname	221	396	992	1,295	1,731	1,730
129	Ghana	135	133	136	135	127	128
130	Antigua and Barbuda	61	73	82	81	81	80
131	Saint Kitts and Nevis	31	37	39	93	49	47
132	Luxembourg	30	10	10	10	10	27
132	Gabon	23	23	23	23	23	23
133	Djibouti	7	7	7	7	7	7
134	Nauru	1	1	1	1	1	1
