= AgMES =

Standardised metadata for agriculture

The AgMES (Agricultural Metadata Element set) initiative was developed by the Food and Agriculture Organization (FAO) of the United Nations and aims to encompass issues of semantic standards in the domain of agriculture with respect to description, resource discovery, interoperability, and data exchange for different types of information resources.

There are numerous other metadata schemas for different types of information resources. The following list contains a list of a few examples:

- Document-like Information Objects (DLIOs): Dublin Core, Agricultural Metadata Element Set (AgMES)
- Events: VCalendar
- Geographic and Regional Information: Geographic information—Metadata ISO/IEC 11179 Standards
- Persons: Friend-of-a-friend (FOAF), vCard
- Plant Production and Protection: Darwin Core (1.0 and 2.0) (DwC)

AgMES as a namespace is designed to include agriculture specific extensions for terms and refinements from established standard metadata namespaces like Dublin Core, AGLS etc. Thus, to be used for Document-like Information Objects, for example like publications, articles, books, web sites, papers, etc., it will have to be used in conjunction with the standard namespaces mentioned before. The AgMES initiative strives to achieve improved interoperability between information resources in agricultural domain by enabling means for exchange of information.

Describing a DLIO with AgMES means exposing its major characteristics and contents in a standard way that can be reused easily in any information system. The more institutions and organizations in the agricultural domain that use AgMES to describe their DLIOs, the easier it will be to interchange data in between information systems like digital libraries and other repositories of agricultural information.

== Use of AgMES ==
Metadata on agricultural Document-like Information Objects (DLIOs) can be created and stored in various formats:

- embedded in a web site (in the manner as with the HTML meta tag)
- in a separate metadata database
- in an XML file
- in an RDF file

AgMES defines elements that can be used to describe a DLIO that can be used together with other metadata standards such as the Dublin Core, the Australian Government Locator Service. A complete list of all elements, refinements and schemes endorsed by AgMES is available from the AgMES website.

=== Creating application profiles ===
Application profiles are defined as schemas which consist of data elements drawn from one or more namespaces, combined by implementers, and optimized for a particular local application. Application profiles share the following four characteristics:

- They draw upon existing pool of metadata definition standards to extract suitable application- or requirement oriented elements.
- An application profile cannot create new elements.
- Application profiles specify the application specific details such as the schemes or controlled vocabularies. An application profile also contains information such as the format for the element value, cardinality or data type.
- Lastly, an application profile can refine standardized definitions as long as it is "semantically narrower or more specific". This capability of application profiles caters to situations where a domain specific terminology is needed to replace a more general one.

=== Sample application profiles using AgMES ===
- The AGRIS Application Profile is a standard created specifically to enhance the description, exchange and subsequent retrieval of agricultural Document-like Information Objects (DLIOs). It is a format that allows sharing of information across dispersed bibliographic systems and is based on well-known and accepted metadata standards.
- The Event Application Profile is a standard created to allow members of the Agricultural community to 'know' about an upcoming event and guide them to the event Web site where they can find further information. The information communicated is thus minimum yet interoperable across domains and organizations.

== AgMES and the semantic web ==
One of the advantages of the AgMES metadata schema is the ability to link between the metadata element and controlled vocabularies. The use of controlled vocabulary provides a "known" set of options to the indexer (and the search programmer) as to how the field can be filled out. Often the values may come from a specific thesaurus (e.g. AGROVOC) or classification schemes (e.g. the AGRIS/CARIS classification scheme) etc.

Thanks to the possibility to use controlled vocabularies for metadata elements, the user is provided with the most precise information. In this context, work is also being carried out on exploiting the power of controlled vocabularies expressed as using URIs and machine-understandable semantics. In this context, FAO is promoting the Agricultural Ontology Service (AOS) initiative with the objective of expressing more semantics within the traditional thesaurus AGROVOC and build a Concept Server as a repository from which it will be always possible to extract traditional KOS.

== See also ==
- Agricultural Information Management Standards
- AGRIS
- AGROVOC
