= Alexander Galushkin =

Russian lawyer

Alexander A. Galushkin
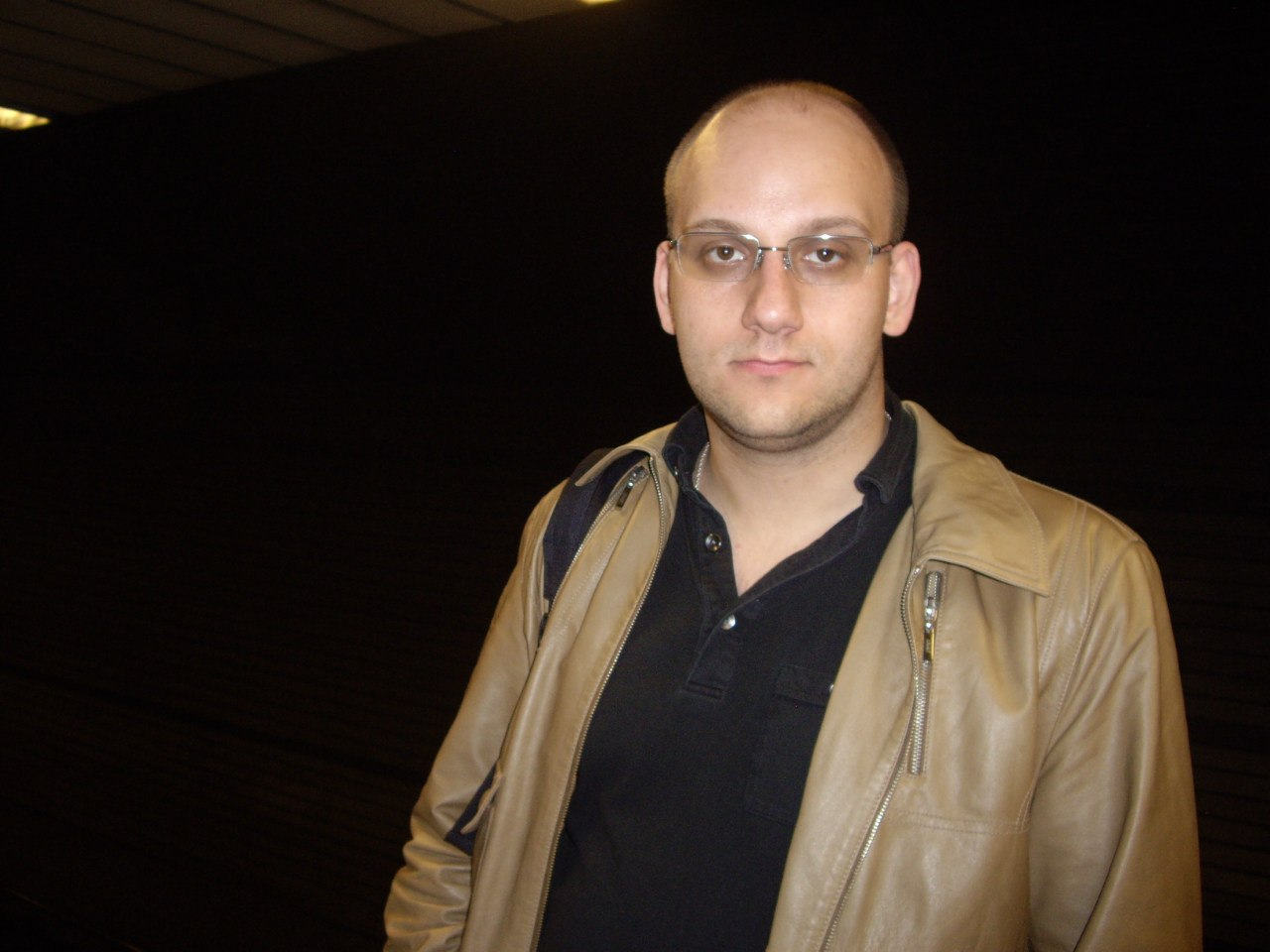
- Born: Moscow, Russia
- Education: Peoples' Friendship University of Russia
- Awards: For Achievements in Development of Science and Economy of Russia
- Scientific career
- Fields: Law
- Thesis: Legal and Organizational Bases of Combating Illegal Immigration and Illegal Acquisition of Citizenship in Russian Federation and other countries-members of the Commonwealth of Independent States (2013)
- Doctoral advisor: General Major V.G. Bessarabov

Alexander A. Galushkin is a Russian scientist and lawyer, permanent representative of the Russian scientific community to the United Nation in Geneva and Vienna since 2018, Doctor of Philosophy in Law, Doctor of Education and professor, academian of the Russian Academy of Natural Sciences, member of the International Bar Association, International Law Association, Moscow Bar Association.

== Career in law ==
Galushkin started his career in law in 2005 as a junior lawyer. He worked for a number of commercial, non-profit and governmental organizations. After passing the bar exam, he worked for some law firms and in 2014 became a senior partner of the law firm Moscow Guild of Barristers and Solicitors, which is headquartered in Moscow, Russia. He was admitted to practice law in the Russian Federation and is a member of the Moscow Bar Association. He specializes on counteraction to illegal actions of governmental officials, including bringing to the administrative liability, and application of international law.

== Career in science ==
Author of five monographs, two study books, 120 scientific articles (including 10 articles indexed in Scopus). Is one of the most cited scientists-lawyers in Russia as per Russian Science Citation Index.

As a professor, he worked and read lectures in a number of universities and academies in Russia and some other countries including RUDN University, Moscow University of Railway Engineers and others.

== Editorial work ==
Founder and an owner of the Alexander Galushkin Publishing House, which publishes seven research journals.

Galushkin is an editor-in-chief of all 10 scientific journals. Some journals are indexed/abstracted in the FAO UN, European Reference Index for the Humanities and the Social Sciences, Directory of Open Access Journals, Russian Science Citation Index.

As an editor and an editor-in-chief, he worked in a number of scientific journals.

== Recognitions ==
For his work avoider, Galushkin was awarded by Federal Drug Control Service of Russia, Civic Chamber of the Russian Federation, Russian Academy of Educational Sciences, Russian Academy of Natural Sciences and other.
