= List of countries by pineapple production =

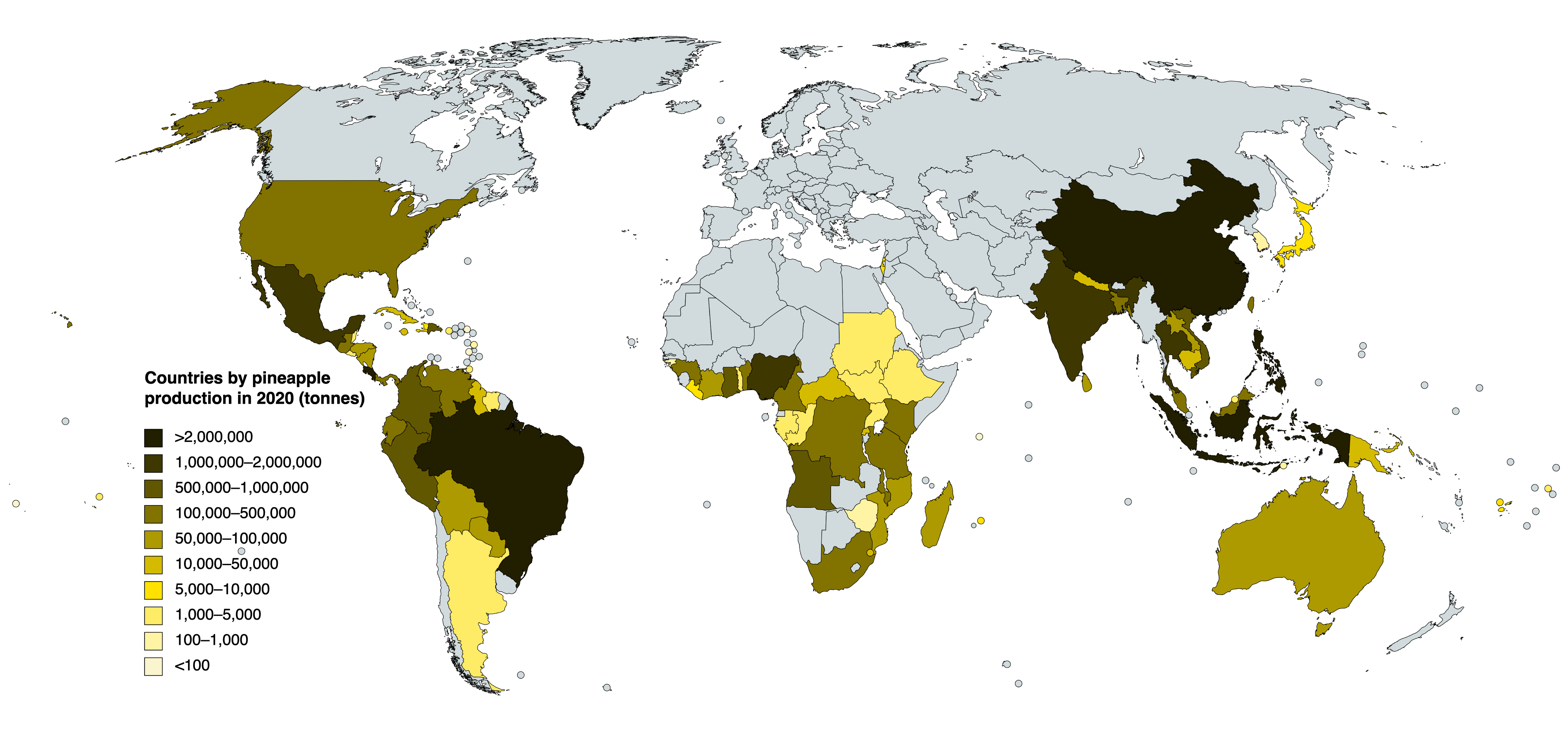
Countries by pineapple production in 2020

This is a list of countries by pineapple production from 2016 to 2022, based on data from the Food and Agriculture Organization Corporate Statistical Database. The estimated total world production for pineapples in 2022 was 29,361,138 metric tonnes, an increase of 2.3% from 28,714,479 tonnes in 2021. Dependent territories are shown in italics.

== Production by country ==
=== >100,000 tonnes ===
| Rank | Country | 2022 | 2021 | 2020 | 2019 | 2018 | 2017 | 2016 |
|---|---|---|---|---|---|---|---|---|
| 1 | Indonesia | 3,203,775 | 2,886,417 | 2,447,243 | 2,196,456 | 1,805,499 | 1,795,986 | 1,396,153 |
| 2 | Philippines | 2,914,425 | 2,860,202 | 2,702,554 | 2,747,857 | 2,730,985 | 2,671,711 | 2,612,474 |
| 3 | Costa Rica | 2,909,750 | 2,938,334 | 2,648,138 | 2,802,712 | 3,418,155 | 3,317,028 | 2,923,158 |
| 4 | Brazil | 2,337,302 | 2,323,485 | 2,456,154 | 2,418,321 | 2,652,231 | 2,309,634 | 2,559,117 |
| 5 | China | 1,960,000 | 1,899,000 | 1,847,000 | 2,158,691 | 2,057,084 | 1,494,800 | 1,399,500 |
| 6 | India | 1,851,000 | 1,799,000 | 1,732,000 | 1,711,000 | 1,706,000 | 1,861,000 | 1,924,000 |
| 7 | Thailand | 1,714,213 | 1,750,630 | 1,680,884 | 1,825,257 | 2,350,887 | 2,328,378 | 2,013,634 |
| 8 | Nigeria | 1,607,200 | 1,594,859 | 1,582,519 | 1,569,952 | 1,589,395 | 1,568,421 | 1,533,207 |
| 9 | Mexico | 1,247,593 | 1,271,521 | 1,208,247 | 1,041,161 | 999,593 | 945,210 | 875,839 |
| 10 | Colombia | 919,709 | 927,050 | 834,719 | 1,008,687 | 899,404 | 944,210 | 980,082 |
| 11 | Angola | 710,530 | 663,263 | 637,630 | 574,155 | 547,063 | 544,303 | 640,550 |
| 12 | Vietnam | 705,460 | 723,915 | 712,050 | 707,880 | 654,801 | 617,944 | 555,407 |
| 13 | Ghana | 678,079 | 680,277 | 679,191 | 674,769 | 686,872 | 675,934 | 661,500 |
| 14 | Peru | 587,217 | 588,841 | 583,628 | 565,203 | 548,465 | 494,642 | 461,286 |
| 15 | Dominican Republic | 496,873 | 443,226 | 428,599 | 461,025 | 407,108 | 384,165 | 375,506 |
| 16 | Benin | 472,514 | 406,220 | 362,964 | 350,345 | 374,601 | 344,811 | 303,887 |
| 17 | Venezuela | 472,400 | 475,512 | 473,016 | 471,561 | 472,984 | 472,113 | 478,202 |
| 18 | Taiwan | 403,730 | 402,836 | 419,028 | 431,084 | 432,084 | 553,531 | 527,161 |
| 19 | Tanzania | 384,215 | 382,476 | 380,493 | 389,678 | 377,257 | 374,543 | 371,484 |
| 20 | Guatemala | 342,204 | 340,515 | 358,714 | 342,574 | 347,878 | 328,651 | 327,453 |
| 21 | Malawi | 331,887 | 333,929 | 309,092 | 300,000 | 319,945 | 293,500 | 203,524 |
| 22 | Cameroon | 312,968 | 289,079 | 281,837 | 277,341 | 251,831 | 244,963 | 227,566 |
| 23 | Ecuador | 295,311 | 206,660 | 104,059 | 46,348 | 149,548 | 165,307 | 116,044 |
| 24 | Malaysia | 287,799 | 323,047 | 323,420 | 314,627 | 322,460 | 340,722 | 391,714 |
| 25 | Kenya | 257,022 | 282,655 | 330,331 | 335,353 | 349,431 | 399,972 | 224,190 |
| 26 | Bangladesh | 206,164 | 208,141 | 218,048 | 217,439 | 208,401 | 211,833 | 200,701 |
| 27 | Democratic Republic of the Congo | 188,620 | 189,170 | 189,720 | 189,102 | 187,340 | 188,741 | 190,882 |
| 28 | United States | 168,322 | 168,018 | 168,284 | 168,665 | 167,106 | 169,080 | 169,810 |
| 29 | South Africa | 132,429 | 128,623 | 113,469 | 113,822 | 112,412 | 103,179 | 88,594 |
| 30 | Panama | 128,291 | 71,612 | 101,127 | 96,141 | 87,853 | 112,269 | 94,394 |
| 31 | Honduras | 102,147 | 105,000 | 103,000 | 90,000 | 86,000 | 82,717 | 75,607 |

=== 10,000–100,000 tonnes ===
| Rank | Country | 2022 | 2021 | 2020 | 2019 | 2018 | 2017 | 2016 |
|---|---|---|---|---|---|---|---|---|
| 32 | Madagascar | 88,623 | 89,623 | 88,658 | 87,588 | 84,983 | 84,839 | 83,446 |
| 33 | Bolivia | 86,514 | 86,720 | 85,964 | 87,658 | 86,204 | 86,022 | 85,256 |
| 34 | Laos | 74,650 | 74,600 | 62,194 | 66,885 | 34,230 | 32,470 | 58,400 |
| 35 | Australia | 72,966 | 73,944 | 77,311 | 86,201 | 88,660 | 85,922 | 71,782 |
| 36 | Guinea | 71,437 | 68,887 | 66,428 | 64,057 | 84,690 | 110,637 | 133,558 |
| 37 | Nicaragua | 67,219 | 67,492 | 67,333 | 66,833 | 68,310 | 66,856 | 65,332 |
| 38 | Paraguay | 59,260 | 86,092 | 85,136 | 85,216 | 74,320 | 63,400 | 63,383 |
| 39 | Mozambique | 56,199 | 55,990 | 55,781 | 56,175 | 54,709 | 54,812 | 54,811 |
| 40 | Sri Lanka | 52,869 | 49,106 | 53,145 | 43,001 | 41,581 | 50,675 | 48,407 |
| 41 | Jamaica | 51,652 | 48,634 | 41,536 | 33,938 | 31,998 | 25,848 | 25,296 |
| 42 | Ivory Coast | 40,545 | 42,297 | 30,000 | 49,100 | 32,500 | 48,900 | 38,900 |
| 43 | Guyana | 34,040 | 32,856 | 37,550 | 37,100 | 34,873 | 16,930 | 27,534 |
| 44 | Eswatini | 32,385 | 35,000 | 36,574 | 38,000 | 36,000 | 37,000 | 35,000 |
| 45 | Cuba | 27,854 | 25,825 | 28,057 | 35,621 | 40,897 | 44,288 | 48,501 |
| 46 | Cambodia | 23,920 | 23,967 | 23,929 | 23,865 | 24,106 | 23,817 | 23,672 |
| 47 | Papua New Guinea | 23,490 | 23,385 | 23,281 | 23,384 | 22,672 | 22,691 | 22,759 |
| 48 | Rwanda | 20,917 | 20,787 | 17,729 | 36,372 | 17,788 | 19,236 | 11,167 |
| 49 | Central African Republic | 16,496 | 16,408 | 16,328 | 16,313 | 15,635 | 15,835 | 16,041 |
| 50 | Nepal | 15,324 | 13,971 | 14,450 | 13,846 | 13,389 | 11,540 | 13,291 |
| 51 | Uganda | 12,635 | 15,824 | 12,500 | 8,000 | 5,639 | 4,240 | 3,430 |
| 52 | Zambia | 12,550 | 9,667 | 9,158 | 8,618 | 6,714 | 6,168 | 7,742 |

=== 1,000–10,000 tonnes ===
| Rank | Country | 2022 | 2021 | 2020 | 2019 | 2018 | 2017 | 2016 |
|---|---|---|---|---|---|---|---|---|
| 53 | Liberia | 9,221 | 9,205 | 9,151 | 9,306 | 9,158 | 8,988 | 8,844 |
| 54 | Fiji | 7,393 | 6,350 | 7,423 | 7,158 | 6,008 | 5,906 | 5,135 |
| 55 | Haiti | 7,192 | 7,228 | 7,199 | 7,150 | 7,336 | 7,111 | 7,002 |
| 56 | Japan | 6,783 | 6,990 | 7,390 | 7,460 | 7,340 | 8,500 | 7,770 |
| 58 | Mauritius | 5,579 | 6,547 | 9,674 | 8,459 | 10,043 | 8,760 | 9,707 |
| 59 | Samoa | 4,593 | 4,586 | 4,579 | 4,599 | 4,575 | 4,534 | 4,500 |
| 60 | French Polynesia | 4,450 | 4,418 | 4,386 | 4,321 | 4,444 | 4,426 | 4,321 |
| 61 | Belize | 4,208 | 4,441 | 3,828 | 3,585 | 2,998 | 1,883 | 1,424 |
| 62 | South Sudan | 4,203 | 4,223 | 4,220 | 4,165 | 4,285 | 4,210 | 4,000 |
| 63 | Suriname | 4,185 | 3,827 | 3,795 | 3,899 | 3,578 | 3,657 | 1,184 |
| 64 | Sudan | 3,810 | 3,815 | 3,680 | 3,937 | 3,828 | 3,983 | 4,000 |
| 65 | Republic of the Congo | 3,808 | 3,805 | 3,815 | 3,804 | 3,795 | 3,846 | 3,772 |
| 66 | Argentina | 3,245 | 3,246 | 3,248 | 3,246 | 3,247 | 3,259 | 3,271 |
| 67 | Puerto Rico | 3,036 | 3,106 | 2,931 | 4,462 | 4,725 | 4,914 | 4,990 |
| 68 | Dominica | 2,342 | 2,366 | 2.344 | 2,317 | 2,477 | 2,277 | 2,235 |
| 69 | Togo | 1,897 | 1,907 | 1,900 | 1,883 | 1,938 | 1,879 | 1,831 |
| 70 | Trinidad and Tobago | 1,521 | 1,668 | 2,164 | 2,158 | 2,463 | 1,980 | 1,274 |
| 71 | Gabon | 1,276 | 1,270 | 1,282 | 1,275 | 1,252 | 1,228 | 1,200 |
| 72 | Brunei | 1,243 | 1,240 | 1,247 | 1,241 | 1,233 | 1,211 | 1,189 |

=== <1,000 tonnes ===
| Rank | Country | 2022 | 2021 | 2020 | 2019 | 2018 | 2017 | 2016 |
|---|---|---|---|---|---|---|---|---|
| 73 | South Korea | 972 | 972 | 972 | 950 | 991 | 962 | 922 |
| 74 | Ethiopia | 968 | 287 | 2,559 | 1,164 | 1,152 | 1,375 | 3,025 |
| 75 | El Salvador | 906 | 988 | 4,526 | 1,714 | 1,007 | 1,006 | 4,460 |
| 76 | Guinea-Bissau | 413 | 413 | 413 | 414 | 411 | 414 | 418 |
| 77 | Zimbabwe | 141 | 141 | 141 | 141 | 143 | 141 | 139 |
| 78 | East Timor | 136 | 134 | 136 | 139 | 128 | 141 | 148 |
| 79 | Bhutan | 98 | 128 | 162 | 149 | 108 | 73 | 66 |
| 80 | Saint Lucia | 80 | 52 | 30 | 55 | 79 | 84 | 59 |
| 81 | Grenada | 78 | 94 | 90 | 79 | 92 | 110 | 173 |
| 82 | Seychelles | 32 | 32 | 32 | 33 | 30 | 33 | 35 |
| 83 | Saint Kitts and Nevis | 19 | 9 | | | 1 | 8 | |
| 84 | Cook Islands | 17 | 17 | 17 | 17 | 17 | 16 | 17 |
| 85 | Antigua and Barbuda | 1 | 35 | 47 | 113 | 167 | 278 | 358 |

== Production history by country ==
=== >100,000 tonnes ===
| Country | 2020 | 2010 | 2000 | 1990 | 1980 | 1970 |
|---|---|---|---|---|---|---|
| World | 27,244,583 | 21,324,991 | 15,105,089 | 11,840,549 | 10,830,861 | 5,447,077 |
| Philippines | 2,702,554 | 2,169,233 | 1,559,563 | 1,421,663 | 1,004,800 | 233,431 |
| Costa Rica | 2,648,138 | 2,312,733 | 903,125 | 423,500 | 9,500 | 5,400 |
| Brazil | 2,455,689 | 2,205,586 | 2,003,688 | 1,103,897 | 565,829 | 423,903 |
| Indonesia | 2,447,243 | 1,406,445 | 393,299 | 390,340 | 180,543 | 76,000 |
| China | 1,847,000 | 1,018,400 | 856,500 | 462,549 | 75,200 | 57,000 |
| India | 1,732,000 | 1,386,800 | 1,020,000 | 881,000 | 548,980 | 380,000 |
| Thailand | 1,532,505 | 1,924,659 | 2,248,375 | 1,865,290 | 3,688,400 | 193,990 |
| Nigeria | 1,548,590 | 1,487,350 | 886,110 | 763,000 | 600,000 | 600,000 |
| Mexico | 1,208,247 | 701,746 | 522,422 | 454,668 | 622,729 | 248,772 |
| Colombia | 834,719 | 444,387 | 338,349 | 341,790 | 126,960 | 85,000 |
| Vietnam | 712,050 | 514,793 | 291,400 | 467,851 | 336,639 | 180,000 |
| Ghana | 670,053 | 500,000 | 60,000 | 11,000 | 6,600 | 30,380 |
| Angola | 637,630 | 313,365 | 39,000 | 32,000 | 36,000 | 18,000 |
| Peru | 583,628 | 310,566 | 137,668 | 68,423 | 57,605 | 61,971 |
| Dominican Republic | 428,599 | 165,724 | 64,379 | 56,323 | 20,000 | 13,016 |
| Venezuela | 168,284 | 184,444 | 321,145 | 521,630 | 596,020 | 865,453 |
| Benin | 362,964 | 266,041 | 53,026 | 26,951 | 3,000 | 3,000 |
| Taiwan | 419,028 | 420,172 | 357,535 | 234,629 | 228,804 | 338,191 |
| Tanzania | 419,028 | 420,172 | 357,535 | 234,629 | 228,804 | 338,191 |
| Guatemala | 358,714 | 234,326 | 99,790 | 67,131 | 32,326 | 17,000 |
| Kenya | 330,331 | 272,230 | 606,516 | 225,000 | 180,000 | 32,000 |
| Cameroon | 310,065 | 159,875 | 42,857 | 35,000 | 34,000 | 5,656 |
| Malawi | 85,124 | 70,000 | 51,000 | 50,100 | 53,520 | 35,490 |
| Malaysia | 323,420 | 331,081 | 249,135 | 213,000 | 185,273 | 308,400 |
| Bangladesh | 218,048 | 234,493 | 148,000 | 162,445 | 153,365 | 93,500 |
| Democratic Republic of the Congo | 191,486 | 200,548 | 196,000 | 180,000 | 127,500 | 144,500 |
| United States | 372,770 | 320,000 | 76,000 | 70,000 | 47,000 | 36,000 |
| Guinea | 66,428 | 114,113 | 71,500 | 51,072 | 16,500 | 23,000 |
| South Africa | 113,469 | 94,287 | 159,921 | 169,897 | 221,879 | 172,357 |
| Ecuador | 104,059 | 124,500 | 48,507 | 59,021 | 135,023 | 59,090 |
| Panama | 101,127 | 96,909 | 18,329 | 12,624 | 5,638 | 3,300 |
