= AGRIS =

Global public domain database

AGRIS is the Food and Agriculture Organization of the United Nations' (FAO) International System for Agricultural Science and Technology, a global public domain database with structured bibliographical records on agricultural science and technology. By February 2025, the AGRIS had more than 15 million records in over 118 languages. The AGRIS search system, allows scientists, researchers, policymaker and students to perform sophisticated searches using keywords from the AGROVOC thesaurus, specific journal titles or names of countries, institutions, and authors.

AGRIS stands out in food and agriculture literature by equally prioritizing grey literature and peer-reviewed articles, recognizing the importance of diverse information sources. It enhances accessibility through AGROVOC, a multilingual thesaurus in over 40 languages, addressing the linguistic diversity in the field. Additionally, AGRIS focuses on analyzing agricultural performance to inform investment, innovation, and policy, promoting sustainability in the agriculture sector.

== History ==
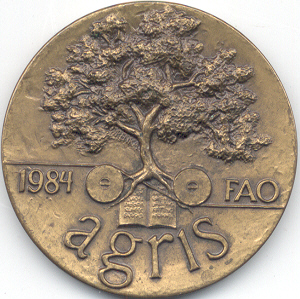
FAO Commemorative 1984 Ten Years of AGRIS Bronze Obverse

Since 1974, the Food and Agriculture Organization of the United Nations (FAO) has provided support to its member countries to make their research outputs visible and accessible through the AGRIS. The search system became operational in 1975 and the database was maintained by Coherence in Information for Agricultural Research for Development, and its content is provided by more than 150 participating institutions from 65 countries.

As information management flourished in the 1970s, the AGRIS metadata corpus was developed to allow its users to have free access to knowledge available in agricultural science and technology. AGRIS was developed to be an international cooperative system to serve both developed and developing countries.

With the advent of the Internet, along with the promises offered by open access publishing, there was growing awareness that the management of agricultural science and technology information, would have various facets: standards and methodologies for interoperability and facilitation of knowledge exchange; tools to enable information management specialists to process data; information and knowledge exchange across countries. Common interoperability criteria were thus adopted in its implementation, and the AGRIS AP metadata was accordingly created in order to allow exchange and retrieval of Agricultural information Resources.

== Multilingualism ==
Multilingualism is a defining characteristic of FAO as an international, intergovernmental agency and it also reflects the reality of global agricultural research, most of which is not conducted in English. Thus multilingualism is fundamental to AGRIS, which indexes bibliographic records in over 118 languages from around the world.

== AGRIS 2.0 ==
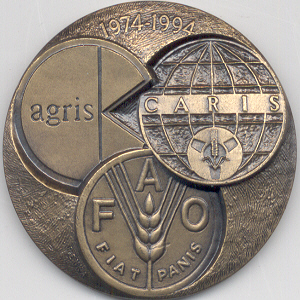
FAO Commemorative 1994 Twenty Years of AGRIS Bronze Obverse

On June 13, 2023, the FAO team responsible for AGRIS announced the launch of AGRIS 2.0. This new version introduces significant improvements to both the user interface and the underlying IT architecture, benefiting users and data providers alike.

=== User Interface ===
AGRIS 2.0 features a more user-friendly search interface, making it easier and more intuitive to search for bibliographic references. The interface is available in all six official FAO languages and is designed to resemble popular search engines. Users can perform searches without immediate recourse to filters, though advanced filters are easily accessible for more refined searches. The landing page provides essential information about AGRIS, including answers to key questions about data providers, types of records, and users of the database.

=== Search Results ===
The search results page in AGRIS 2.0 offers clearly demarcated filters on the left side, allowing users to narrow results by publication date, language, data provider, country, and AGROVOC search terms. Each search result displays information in a clear and comprehensible manner, with multilingual titles and abstracts where applicable.

=== IT Architecture ===
The new IT architecture behind AGRIS 2.0 offers several benefits for data providers:

- Fast Turnaround: Near real-time indexing of metadata submitted by email.
- Metadata Flexibility: Enhanced flexibility in metadata formats, allowing different journals from the same organization to use different permissible formats.
- Submission Flexibility: Metadata can be submitted in various ways, including email and automatic harvesting.
- Improved Curation: Greater ability to modify metadata and curate collections, ensuring up-to-date and globally visible collections.

== Metadata formats ==
The AGRIS partners contributing to the AGRIS Database use several formats for exchanging data, including simple DC, from OAI-PMH systems. The minimum requirements for AGRIS metadata are specified in ‘Meaningful Bibliographic Metadata’ (M2B) as part of the Linked Open Data Enabled Bibliographical Data (LODE-BD) Recommendations 3.0. M2B is a set of recommendations designed to assist data providers in selecting appropriate metadata properties for creating, managing and exchanging bibliographic information.

The AGRIS AP format was adopted directly by:

1. Open Archive Initiative (OAI) partners: Scielo, Viikki Science Library
2. BIBSYS, Norway, National Library of Portugal, Wageningen UR Library.
3. National networks: NARIMS in Egypt, PhilAgriNet in Philippines, KAINet in Kenya, NAC in Thailand, GAINS in Ghana.
4. National institutional repositories: Russia, Belarus, Uruguay, Spain, Iran.
5. Information service providers: Wolters Kluwer, NISC, CGIR, CGIAR, AgNIC, GFIS.
6. Database systems/tools: AgriOceanDspace, NewGenlib, WebAGRIS, NERAKIN, AgriDrupal.

== AGRIS under the CIARD ==
Falling under the umbrella of CIARD, a joint initiative co-led by the CGIAR, GFAR and FAO, the new AGRIS aims to promote the sharing and management of agricultural science and technology information through the use of common standards and methodologies. These will incorporate Web 2.0 features, in order to make the search experience as comprehensive, intuitive and far-reaching as possible for users of the new AGRIS.

Furthermore, the new AGRIS will also leverage the data and infrastructure of one of CIARD's projects: the CIARD RING. An acronym standing for Routemap to Information Nodes and Gateways (RING), the CIARD RING project is led by GFAR and it aims to:

- give an overview of the current offer of information services in ARD; as well as
- support those who want to implement new services.

A directory of ARD (Agricultural Research for Development) information services will allow the monitoring, describing and classifying of existing services, whilst benchmarking them against interoperability criteria, to ensure for maximum outreach and global availability.

== See also ==
- Agricultural Information Management Standards
- AgMES
- Agricultural Ontology Service
- AGROVOC
- Information management
- IMARK
- Disciplinary repository
- List of academic databases and search engines
