= E-LIS =

International open-access repository for academic papers

E-prints in Library and Information Science (E-LIS)
- Website type: Community of Practice
- Available in: 22 languages
- Owners: E-LIS Governance and CIEPI
- Website: http://eprints.rclis.org/
- Commercial: No
- Registration: Optional
- Launched: January 2003
- Current status: Online

Eprints in Library and Information Science (E-LIS) is an international open access repository for academic papers in Library and Information Science (LIS). Over 12,000 papers have been archived to date. It is freely accessible, aligned with the Open Access (OA) movement and is a voluntary enterprise.

== About E-LIS ==
E-LIS is the largest international open repository in the field of Library and Information Science. It is freely accessible and users are able to search, access, and archive full-text documents

=== Objectives ===
E-LIS is based on the philosophy and principles of open source software whereby people from all over the world co-operate in building freely-licensed software. Its aim is to further the open access philosophy by making full text Library and Information Science documents visible, accessible, harvestable, searchable, and usable by any potential user with access to the Internet.

The objectives of the E-LIS are:

- To improve knowledge of the building and management of open archives working practically in the field within the framework of Open Digital Libraries;
- Not only to promote open archives in various disciplinary environments, but also to create a valid and credible model in the Library and Information Science discipline for the building of a global LIS archive;
- To establish a base for communal work between librarians information technology professionals, and to enhance the Open Access movement.

=== Governance ===
E-LIS is established, managed and maintained by an international team of 73 librarians and information scientists from 47 countries and support for 22 languages. The development of an international Library and Information Science network has been stimulated by the extension of the open access concept to LIS works and facilitated by the dissemination of material within the LIS community.

The editorial work is performed under the management of an executive board that drives the policies, alliances, new actions, collaborations and any topic that is of interest to E-LIS. The executive board is made up of two chief executives, two representatives of the editorial team, two representatives of CIEPI - International Centre for Research in Information Strategy and Development -which is the association created by E-LIS members for representing institutionally the E-LIS interest as a legal entity - and two technical representatives that have deep technical experience on document repositories. In addition to this structure, the advisory board appointed to advise the executive board is formed by institutions and people that support E-LIS.

=== Users ===
There are currently 8,000 authors represented in E-LIS. It is possible to deposit works in any language, although abstracts and keywords must be included in English, in addition to abstracts and keywords in the original language of the document. In a broad sense, any document related to LIS that is electronically available, can be submitted to the archive in PDF or HTML. The types of user are: librarians, academics, archivists, information management specialists from: academic libraries, archives, government libraries, health libraries, information centres, museums, national libraries, private libraries, public libraries, school libraries or universities.

E-LIS provides features for editors and users including automatic alerts for editors, full metadata display of metadata records, full-text search, browsing by user, a counter in the homepage as well as statistics.

A strength of the repository is the national editors from 47 countries, carrying out the quality control of the metadata. Each editor approves documents of their own country and coordinates the actions on the promotion of E-LIS in their country. All the editors share this common vision and mission, while contributing to E-LIS with their own experience and competence.

E-LIS deals with each country's specific issues to decide the best solution for technical and non-technical barriers so that international visibility can be promoted whilst national interests are served. International co-operation can facilitate debate on current issues.

=== Copyright ===
Copyright is one of the key issues for E-LIS. The submission of documents and their accessibility is not an infringement of copyright. All work in E-LIS remains property of the author. If the document is a preprint, the process is quite straightforward because there are no limits concerning copyright: the author holds the exclusive copyright for the pre-refereed preprints. For the refereed postprint, the issue becomes more complex. The author might have given the rights to, for instance, a publisher. The right to self-archive the refereed postprint is a legal matter because the copyright transfer agreement applies to the text. Most journals permit self-archiving, but it depends on the publisher's copyright policy. Authors can also deposit the postprint inside the archive with restricted access. Some publishers have stated that they grant these rights as a standard procedure. Copyright law gives the creator of copyrighted work exclusive rights, which may be both segmented and transferred to others.

=== Funding ===
Being a nonprofit and voluntary initiative, in the past E-LIS has received small funds from the Spanish Ministry of Education, but there is no regular funding of any kind from any institution or state.

=== Activities ===
The current short-term plan of activities is described in the "Acropolis Strategy". The "Acropolis Strategy" roadmaps the actions of the E-LIS community in 2011. It was drafted by the E-LIS Executive Board and E-LIS staff and sets critical goals, which are expected to improve the current situation of E-LIS services. The "Acropolis Strategy" is continuously referred to in order to assess the progress of the E-LIS community activities. One of E-LIS Team prime priorities is to publish the bibliographic data in E-LIS as Linked Open Data.

== See also ==
- AIMS
