= Agricultural Information Management Standards =

Web site managed by the UN FAO

Agricultural Information Management Standards (AIMS)
- Website type: Community of Practice
- Available in: English
- Website: aims.fao.org
- Commercial: No
- Registration: Optional
- Launched: 2006
- Current status: Online

Agricultural Information Management Standards (AIMS) is a web site managed by the Food and Agriculture Organization of the United Nations (FAO) for accessing and discussing agricultural information management standards, tools and methodologies connecting information workers worldwide to build a global community of practice. Information management standards, tools and good practices can be found on AIMS:

- to support the implementation of structured and linked information and knowledge to enable institutions and individuals from different technical backgrounds to build open and interoperable information systems;
- to provide advice on how to best manage, disseminate, share and exchange agricultural scientific information;
- to promote good practices widely applicable and easy to implement, and;
- to foster communities of practices centered on interoperability, reusability and cooperation.

== Users ==
AIMS is primarily intended for information workers—librarians, information managers, software developers—but is available to the general public as well. The success of AIMS depends upon its communities reaching a critical mass to show that the investment in interoperability standards has a return.

== Community ==
AIMS holds 9 communities of practice. They are intended to discuss and share information about the different ongoing initiatives under the AIMS umbrella. AIMS supports collaboration through forums and blogs amongst institutions and individuals that wish to share expertise on how to use tools, standards and methodologies. Moreover, news and events are published on AIMS as part of its ‘one-stop” access to interoperability and reusability of information resources. The AIMS communities are aimed at the global agricultural community, including information providers, from research institutes, academic institutions, educational and extension institutions and also the private sector.

== Content ==
=== Vocabularies ===
- AGROVOC is a comprehensive multilingual vocabulary that contains close to 40,000 concepts in over 20 languages covering subject fields in agriculture, forestry and fisheries together with cross-cutting themes such as land use, rural livelihoods and food security. It standardizes data description to enable a set of core integration goals: interoperability, reusability and cooperation. In this spirit of collaboration, AGROVOC also works with other organizations that are using Linked Open Data techniques to connect vocabularies and build the backbone of the next generation of internet data; data that is marked up not just for style but for meaning. It is maintained by a global community of librarians, terminologists, information managers and software developers using VocBench, a multilingual, web-based vocabulary editor and workflow management tool that allows for simultaneous, distributed editing.
- In addition to AGROVOC, AIMS provides access to other vocabularies like the Geopolitical ontology and Fisheries Ontologies. The Geopolitical ontology is used to facilitate data exchange and sharing in a standardized manner among systems managing information about countries and/or regions. The network of fisheries ontologies was created as a part of the NeOn Project and it covers the following areas: Water areas: for statistical reporting, jurisdictional (EEZ), environmental (LME), Species: taxonomic classification, ISSCAAP commercial classification, Aquatic resources, Land areas, Fisheries commodities, Vessel types and size, Gear types, AGROVOC, ASFA.
- AgMES is as a namespace designed to include agriculture specific extensions for terms and refinements from established standard metadata namespaces like Dublin Core or AGLS, used for Document-like Information Objects, for example like publications, articles, books, web sites, papers, etc.
- Linked Open Data (LOD) - Enabled Bibliographic Data (LODE-BD) Recommendations 2.0 are a reference tool that assists bibliographic data providers in selecting appropriate encoding strategies according to their needs in order to facilitate metadata exchange by, for example, constructing crosswalks between their local data formats and widely used formats or even with a Linked Data representation

=== Tools ===
- AgriDrupal is both a suite of solutions for agricultural information management and a community of practice around these solutions. The AgriDrupal community is made up of people who work in the community of agricultural information management specialists and have been experimenting with IM solutions in Drupal.
- AgriOcean DSpace is a joint initiative of the United Nations agencies of FAO and UNESCO-IOC/IODE to provide a customized version of DSpace. It uses standards for metadata, thesauri and other controlled vocabularies for oceanography, marine science, food, agriculture, development, fisheries, forestry, natural resources and other related sciences.
- VocBench is a web-based multilingual vocabulary management tool developed by FAO and hosted by MIMOS Berhad. It transforms thesauri, authority lists and glossaries into SKOS/RDF concept schemes for use in a linked data environment. VocBench also manages the workflow and editorial processes implied by vocabulary evolution such as user rights/roles, validation and versioning. VocBench supports a growing set of user communities, including the global, distributed group of terminologists who manage AGROVOC.
- WebAGRIS is a multilingual Web-based system for distributed data input, processing and dissemination (through the Internet or on CD-Rom), of agricultural bibliographic information. It is based on common standards of data input and dissemination formats (XML, HTML, ISO2709), as well as subject categorization schema and AGROVOC.

=== Services ===
- AgriFeeds is a service that allows users to search and filter news and events from several agricultural information sources and to create custom feeds based on the filters applied. AgriFeeds was designed in the context on CIARD (Coherence in Information for Agricultural Research for Development). Within CIARD, the partners who designed and implemented AgriFeeds are FAO and GFAR. AgriFeeds is currently maintained by FAO.
- AGRIS is a global public domain database with nearly 3 million structured bibliographical records on agricultural science and technology. The database is maintained by FAO, with the content provided by more than 100 participating institutions from 65 countries.
- CIARD Routemap to Information Nodes and Gateways (RING) is a project implemented within CIARD and is led by GFAR. The RING is a global registry of web-based services that give access to any kind of information pertaining to agricultural research for development (ARD). It allows information providers to register their services in various categories and so facilitate the discovery of sources of agriculture-related information across the world.
- Since January 2011, AIMS supports E-LIS, the international electronic archive for library and information science (LIS). E-LIS is established, managed and maintained by an international team of 73 librarians and information scientists from 47 countries and support for 22 languages. It is freely accessible, aligned with the Open Access (OA) movement and is a voluntary enterprise. Currently it is the largest international repository in the LIS field. Searching or browsing E-LIS is a kind of multilingual, multicultural experience, an example of what could be accomplished through open access archives to bring the people of the world together.
- VEST Registry is a catalog of controlled vocabularies (such as authority files, classification systems, concept maps, controlled lists, dictionaries, ontologies or subject headings); metadata sets (metadata element sets, namespaces and application profiles); and tools (such as library management software, content management systems or document repository software). It is concerned primarily with collecting and maintaining a consistent set of metadata for each resource. The scope of the VEST Registry is to provide a clearing house for tools, metadata sets and vocabularies used in food, agriculture, development, fisheries, forestry and natural resources information management context.

== See also ==
- AGRIS
- AGROVOC
- E-LIS
- IMARK
- Geopolitical ontology
