= Food Balance Sheet =

Summary of a country's food supply

Food balance sheet shows a brief picture of the pattern of the food supply of a country. For each food item, it sketches the primary commodity availability for human consumption i.e. the sources of supply and its utilization in terms of nutrient value.

A food balance sheet is a comprehensive compilation of a selected country's food supply during a specific time period. The food balance sheet shows the food items for human consumption, along with how it is produced, used, imported/exported, and how it benefits the society (per capita supply). The total quantity produced in a country added to the total quantity imported and adjusted to any change in stocks that may have occurred since the beginning of the reference period gives the supply available during that period. On the utilization side a distinction is made between the quantities exported, fed to livestock + used for seed, losses during storage and transportation, and food supplies available for human consumption. The per capita supply of each such food item available for human consumption is then obtained by dividing the respective quantity by the related data on the population actually partaking in it. Data on per capita food supplies are expressed in terms of quantity and by applying appropriate food composition factors for all primary and processed products also in terms of dietary energy value, protein and fat content.

The food balance sheet covers production, trade, feed and seed, waste, other utilization, availability, quantities, calories, proteins, and fats. By combining these elements, one is able to detect the food security of a country, how reliant it is on imported crops/foodstuffs, and how it attributes to world exports.

According to Margaret Buchanan-Smith of the Overseas Development Institute, London, the food balance sheet is the most traditional and widely used method of translating "early warning data into food aid requirements."

== East African Community Regional Food Balance Sheet ==
The EAC Regional Food Balance has been developed by the EAC Secretariat in collaboration with EAC Partner States (relevant public and private sector organizations). It is developed further to the provisions of the EAC Food Security Action Plan.

The background behind its development is recognition of it being an important tool towards the regions efforts of managing the food security situation. In principle, the Regional Food Balance Sheet is expected to give accurate and reliable information about food availability in the current period. It is a departure from the known traditional food balance sheet which gave historical information.

The RFBS is therefore a powerful tool for use by Governments in determining adequacy of food supplies for purposes managing food security concerns. Where the RFBS posts food surplus, the immediate impact is to release funds that the Government would have tied up in securing food not knowing that the region has sufficient food. It also encourages Governments to come up with proactive trade policy measures to encourage flow of food from countries which the RFBS reveal as having surplus. It therefore leads to actualization of the objectives of the EAC Customs Union of free flow of goods within the EAC region.

The RFBS is a powerful tool for the private sector to use in planning exports and imports. First preference due to preferential duties is the EAC regional market, where the private sector has an advantage over other supplies coming from outside the EAC region. It enables the private sector to use the hedge of Common External Tariffs which is in favour of intra-EAC trade to exploit trade potential for the various products covered under the RFBS. The RFBS is also a tool that the private sector will use to engage Governments whenever there are reported short fall in supplies as revealed by RFBS, cannot meet. In such a case, the RFBS data will be used to lobby for temporary stay of application of Common External Tariff for the products facing regional shortages.

The RFBS is a powerful tool for Relief Agencies to use in determining regional food security crisis and planning for relief supplies. It is also a useful tool for the Relief Agencies to use in sourcing food supplies from the region based on the revealed food availability.

The scope of the comprehensive EAC Regional Food Balance Sheet has been informed by the EAC Food Security priority products that are covered under the following components a) Cereals and Pulses b) Livestock (Meat, Dairy Products and Animal Fats) c) Fisheries d) Horticulture (Fruits, Vegetables and Roots and Tubers) e) Industrial Crops (Sugar and Sugar Products, Oil Crops and Vegetable Oils)

More information on the methodology can be found on http://www.rfbs.in

== Country Example: Ivory Coast ==
In Ivory Coast, a developing country, food security is an issue. This is apparent under Ivory Coast's 2009 (the most recent statistics) food balance sheet. Cereals- including wheat, corn, rye, oats, etc.- are a large part of the Ivorian diet. 1,834,000 metric tons are imported, 1,167,000 metric tons are produced, while only 112,000 metric tons are exported. Cocoa production in Ivory Coast is the largest cocoa industry in the world, accounting for 30% of the World's production as of 2009. While producing 1,223,000 metric tons, Ivorians export 1,192,000 metric tons, making cocoa a major cash crop.
