= IMARK =

Information Management Resource Kit (IMARK)
- Website type: Capacity building
- Available in: English, French, Spanish, Arabic, Chinese
- Website: www.imarkgroup.org
- Commercial: No
- Registration: Optional
- Launched: 2001
- Current status: Online

The Information Management Resource Kit (IMARK) is a partnership-based e-learning initiative developed by the Food and Agriculture Organization (FAO) of the United Nations and partner organizations to support individuals, institutions and networks worldwide in the effective management of information and agricultural development. IMARK consists of a suite of distance learning resources and tools on information management.

== About IMARK ==
The Food and Agriculture Organization (FAO) of the United Nations initiated a partnership-based e-learning programme in 2001 to support information management. IMARK is targeted at information professionals in developing countries. Each IMARK curriculum is designed through a consultative process with subject matter experts, field practitioners and representatives from the target audience from around the world. The IMARK initiative is a response to demand for enhanced information and knowledge management in the effort to achieve the Millennium Development Goals (MDGs), especially those related to hunger and the information society, in the context of bridging the digital divide. The development goal of IMARK is to improve the capabilities of people concerned with information management and knowledge sharing.

=== Objectives and Scope ===
The development goal of IMARK is to improve the overall effectiveness of programmes in agricultural development and food security by enhancing access to information by key stakeholders.

=== Steering committee ===
IMARK has over 30 partners and collaborating institutions since its inception in 2001, and its activities are coordinated through a steering committee whose members include The Association for Progressive Communications (APC), Food and Agriculture Organization (FAO) of the United Nations, the Agence Universitaire de la Francophonie (AUF), Commonwealth of Learning (COL), Groupe de Recherches et d'Echanges Technologiques (GRET), Bibliotheca Alexandrina and UNESCO.

== See also ==
- E-learning
- Food and Agriculture Organization of the United Nations (FAO)
- Agricultural Information Management Standards (AIMS)
