= SameAs =

Semantic concept in linked data

In data science, sameAs or exactMatch is a method of indicating that the subject of, or entity represented by, two resources is considered to be one and the same thing. It is a key part of the Semantic Web.

== Uses ==
The concept of sameAs exists in a number of different schemas and systems:

- OWL - owl:sameAs
- schema.org
- SKOS - skos:exactMatch
- Wikidata - Property:P2888 "exact match", with the alias "sameas"

The owl:sameAs predicate has been described as "an essential ingredient of the Semantic Web architecture".
