= Global Administrative Unit Layers =

Spatial database of all the administrative units in the world

The Global Administrative Unit Layers (GAUL) is a spatial database of the administrative units for all the countries in the world. It is a project of the Food and Agriculture Organization (FAO) of the United Nations.

== Mission ==
The GAUL aims at compiling and disseminating the most reliable geographic information on administrative units for all the countries in the world, thereby contributing to the standardization of the spatial dataset representing administrative units. In this framework, its purposes are:

- to overcome the fragmentation of the global dataset occurring when administrative units layers are digitized on a country-by-country basis
- to keep historical track of changes occurring on the shapes and extent of the administrative units
- to promote a unified coding system that reduces maintenance efforts.

== Characteristics ==
The GAUL always maintains global geographic layers (in shapefile format) with a unified coding system at the levels of country, first administrative (e.g. regions), and second administrative (e.g. districts). In addition, when data is available, it provides layers on a country-by-country basis down to third, fourth and lower levels. The target beneficiary of the GAUL data is the UN community, universities, and other authorized international and national institutions/agencies. Data might not be officially validated by authoritative national sources and can not be distributed to the general public. A disclaimer should always accompany any use of the GAUL data.

Because the GAUL works at global level, controversial boundaries can not be ignored. The approach of the GAUL is to maintain disputed areas in such a way to preserve national integrity for all disputing countries.

The coastline of the GAUL is mostly compliant with the coast of the International Boundary map delivered by the UN Cartographic Section except for some countries (e.g. Vietnam, India, Bangladesh, etc.) where it has been updated according to the satellite images (e.g. Landsat ETM). For future releases of the GAUL, the process of updating the coastline will go on, country by country, through a comparison with the satellite images.

The GAUL keeps track of administrative units that have been changed, added, or deleted in the past. Changes implemented in different years are recorded in the GAUL on different layers. For this reason the GAUL product is not a single layer but a group of layers, named the GAUL Set. The GAUL project does not implement changes dated before 1990.

GAUL codes are numeric and unique for all administrative units at any of the administrative hierarchical level. Any GAUL code is independent from the codes of its higher administrative levels. GAUL codes assigned to administrative units of a given country are not necessarily sequential numbers. The main benefit of the GAUL Coding System is that changing in the codes of an administrative unit might not imply a change of codes of the correspondent units at lower levels. This means that the effort to maintain the links between thematic data and associated administrative units is reduced to a minimum.

== Organization ==
The implementation of the GAUL initiative is based on a collaborative work among international agencies and national authorities generating and collecting spatial information on administrative units. The role of FAO is to keep this network of collaborators active, to evaluate and compile data from available sources, to establish procedures for data integration, to generate the GAUL codes and periodically to disseminate the GAUL Set. The overall methodology consists in:

1. collecting the best available data from most reliable sources
2. establishing validation periods of the geographic features (when possible)
3. adding selected data to the global layer based on the international boundaries provided by the UN Cartographic Unit
4. generating codes using the GAUL Coding System
5. distributing data to the users

The GAUL has a consistent framework for the delivery of the data. Once a year, an updated version of the GAUL set is released through Geonetwork. A new version includes all updates made in the course of the previous year. The dataset is free of charge and it can be downloaded by login (to receive an account, just send an email to the contacts listed at the bottom of this article). The new version GAUL 2009 will be available on Geonetwork from January 2009.
