= Global Forum on Agricultural Research and Innovation =

Global Forum on Agricultural Research and Innovation (GFAR)
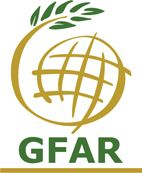
- Formation: 1996
- Type: Global Forum
- Legal status: International Forum
- Purpose: Agricultural research and innovation
- Headquarters: Rome
- Location: Italy
- Region served: Worldwide
- Chair: Dr. Ravinder Kumar Khetarpal
- Website: www.gfar.net

The Global Forum on Agricultural Research and Innovation (GFAR) is an international forum that focuses on the future of agriculture and its role in development around the world.

Established in 1996, GFAR was formed as a project for resource sharing.

GFAR's headquarters is in Rome, Italy, where it is hosted by FAO. Its current chair is Dr. Ravinder Kumar Khetarpal.

== History ==
The first gatherings for the stakeholders were the GFAR Triennial Conferences. The first was held in Dresden, Germany, in May 2000, on "Strengthening research partnerships in the globalized world of the turn of century". The second was held in Dakar, Senegal, in 2003 with the theme "Linking Research and Rural Innovation to Sustainable Development". The third was held in New Delhi, India, in 2006 with the theme "Reorienting Agricultural Research to meet the Millennium Development Goals (MDGs)".

Subsequently, the meetings were replaced by Global Conferences on Agricultural Research for Development (GCARD), along with the Annual General Meetings of CGIAR. The Global Conference on Agricultural Research for Development 2010 (GCARD1) was held in Montpellier, France, from 28 to 31 March 2010, on the theme “Enhancing Development Impact from Research: Building on Demand”.

The Global Conference on Agricultural Research for Development 2012 (GCARD2) was held in Uruguay, 29 October–1 November 2012, on the theme "Foresight and Partnership for Innovation and Impact on Smallholder Livelihoods".

== Goal, objectives and pillars ==
GFAR's goal is to ensure that agricultural innovation systems, encompassing research, extension, education, and enterprise - deliver the best development outcomes to resource-poor farmers and rural communities.

GFAR seeks to ensure agricultural innovation and delivers its intended development impact through

== Gender in Agriculture Partnership ==
According to FAO, approximately 70% of all farmers in the developing world are women. If access to new technology, training, and resources is made available to these farmers, yields could increase by 20 to 30% and could reduce the number of hungry people in the world by 100 to 150 million people.

GAP's vision is to ensure transformed agriculture where gender equity enables food, nutrition and income security for the rural poor.
