= AGROVOC =

Multilingual controlled vocabulary

AGROVOC is a multilingual controlled vocabulary covering areas of interest of the Food and Agriculture Organization of the United Nations (FAO), aiming to promote the visibility of research produced among FAO members. By March 2024, AGROVOC consisted of over 42 000 concepts and up to 1 000 000 terms in more than 42 different languages. It is a collaborative effort, the outcome of consensus among a community of experts coordinated by FAO.

== History ==
FAO first published AGROVOC at the beginning of the 1980s in English, Spanish and French to serve as a controlled vocabulary to index publications in agricultural science and technology, especially for the International System for Agricultural Science and Technology (AGRIS). In the 1990s, AGROVOC shifted from paper printing to a digital format opting for data storage handled by a relational database. In 2004, preliminary experiments with expressing AGROVOC into the Web Ontology Language (OWL) took place. At the same time a web based editing tool was developed, then called WorkBench, nowadays VocBench. In 2009 AGROVOC became an SKOS resource.

== Usage ==
Today, AGROVOC is available in different languages. It is employed for tagging resources, allowing searches in a specific language while providing results in many others, enhancing their visibility worldwide. Additionally, it serves for organizing knowledge to facilitate subsequent data retrieval, tagging website content for search engine discovery, standardizing agricultural information data and acting as a reference for translations. Moreover, it finds applications in fields such as data mining, big data, or artificial intelligence.

Updated AGROVOC content is released once a month and is available for public use.

== Maintenance ==
FAO coordinates the editorial activities related to the maintenance of AGROVOC. Content curation is carried out by a community of editors and institutions responsible for each of the language versions. VocBench, is the tool used to edit and maintain AGROVOC in a distributed way. FAO also facilitates the technical maintenance of AGROVOC.

== Copyright and license ==
Copyright for AGROVOC content in FAO languages (English, French, Spanish, Arabic, Russian and Chinese) is held by FAO, while content in other languages stays with the institutions that authored it. AGROVOC thesaurus content in English, Russian, French, Spanish, Arabic and Chinese is licensed under the international Creative Commons Attribution License (CC-BY-4.0).

== See also ==
- Agricultural Information Management Standards – Web site managed by the UN FAO
- AGRIS – Global public domain database
- Food and Agriculture Organization of the United Nations – Specialized agency of the United Nations
