= Russian Science Citation Index =

Russian bibliographic database

Russian Science Citation Index (Russian: Российский индекс научного цитирования) is a bibliographic database of scientific publications in Russian. It holds around 13 million publications by Russian authors and information about citing publications from over 5,000 Russian journals.

The Russian Science Citation Index has been developed since 2005 by the Scientific Electronic Library eLIBRARY.RU. The information-analytical system Science Index is a search engine of this database; It offers a wide range of services for authors, research institutions and scientific publishers. It is designed not only for operational search for relevant bibliographic information, but is also as a powerful tool to assess the impact and effectiveness of research organizations, scientists, and the level of scientific journals, etc.

== See also ==
- List of academic databases and search engines
- Science Citation Index
- Scopus

== Bibliography ==
- Gorin, Sergey V.; Koroleva, Anna M.; Gerasimov, Alexey N.; Voronov, Alexander A. (27 August 2020). "The Russian Science Citation Index (RSCI): the first three years (2016–2018)". European Science Editing. 46 e51051. doi:10.3897/ese.2020.e51051.
- Mazov, N. A.; Gureev, V. N.; Kalenov, N. E. (1 March 2018). "Some Assessments of the List of Journals in the Russian Science Citation Index". Herald of the Russian Academy of Sciences. 88 (2): 133–141. doi:10.1134/S1019331618020053. S2CID 149495880.
