= Food and Agriculture Organization Corporate Statistical Database =

FAOSTAT statistical database (Food and Agriculture Organization of the United Nations)

Statistics are at the core of the work of the Food and Agriculture Organization of the United Nations (FAO), its mandate and strategic goals. Article I of its Constitution states that "The Organization shall collect, analyse, interpret and disseminate information relating to nutrition, food and agriculture. [...] the term 'agriculture' and its derivatives include forestry, fisheries and aquaculture".

The Food and Agriculture Organization Statistical Database (FAOSTAT database) disseminates statistical data collected and maintained by FAO. It is one of FAO's most important corporate platforms and is the largest statistical database on food and agriculture in the world.

== About ==
FAOSTAT serves as the foremost authoritative source of agrifood systems data, including food security, agriculture and nutrition; agriculture production and trade; prices of commodities; investment; population and employment in agrifood systems; food and diet; land, inputs and sustainability, climate change and agrifood systems emissions; structural data on agriculture; and it includes data from forestry.

FAOSTAT is maintained by the Statistics Division of the Food and Agriculture Organization of the United Nations. Data is collected from member countries, analysed and disseminated together with accompanying briefs. In working directly with the countries, the Statistics Division supports the development of national statistical strategies, the strengthening of institutional and technical capacities, and the improvement of statistical systems.

FAOSTAT data are provided as a time-series from 1961 to the present for most domains for 245 countries in Arabic, Chinese, English, French, Russian and Spanish. Some structural data from agricultural censuses start as early as 1930.

The freely accessible platform gathers around 2.4 million visitors each year – among them policymakers, researchers, analysts, the private sector or civil society.

== Domains ==
- Production

Production quantity and value of primary and processed crops and livestock commodities, also including harvested areas, yields, and number of live and slaughtered animals.

- Trade

Statistics on international trade of food and agricultural products, including trade flows. The food and agricultural trade datasets are collected, processed and disseminated by FAO according to the standard International Merchandise Trade Statistics methodology.

- Food Security and Nutrition

The Suite of Food Security Indicators, including the series of SDG indicators 2.1.1 (prevalence of undernourishment) and 2.1.2 (prevalence of moderate or severe food insecurity) and statistics on the dimensions of availability, access, utilization and stability.

- Food Balances

Food Balance Sheet (FBS) and Supply Utilization Accounts as well as non-food Commodity Balances. FBSs present a harmonized picture of the agrifood situation of a country, showing a country's food supply and utilizations for primary and derived products in terms of primary commodities.

- Cost and Affordability of a Healthy Diet

The cost of purchasing the least-expensive healthy diet which comprises a variety of locally available foods that meet energy and nutritional requirements. The prevalence of unaffordability (PUA) and the number of people unable to afford a healthy diet (NUA) show the percentage and number of individuals in a population who are unable to pay the amount of money needed to acquire the least-cost healthy diet, after having accounted for a portion of their income reserved for basic non-food goods and services.

- Land, Inputs and Sustainability

Land use and land cover; organic and inorganic fertilizers, pesticides; sustainability indicators such as cropland nutrient balance, livestock patterns, bioenergy; and temperature change on land.

- Climate change: Agrifood systems emissions

Agrifood systems greenhouse gas (GHG) emissions including breakdowns by pre- and post- production and farm gate emissions as well as emissions from land use and land use change.

- Prices

The prices domain of FAOSTAT contains annual and monthly producer prices, annual producer price index, and consumer price index.

- Population and Employment

Indicators on agrifood systems employment in agriculture and rural areas, as well as population, by sex and urban/rural.

- Investment

Investment statistics, government expenditure on the agriculture sector, development flows to agriculture, agricultural credit and foreign direct investment.

- Macro-Economic Indicators

Macroeconomic statistics, capital stock and capital formation.

- Food Value Chain

Data on consumers' expenditures among the different agrifood value chain industries and factors of production. It highlights 3 food value chains showing the domestic final consumption expenditure on food at purchaser's prices: Food At Home (FAH); Food and Tobacco at Home (FTAH); Food and Accommodation Away From Home (FAAFH).

- Food and Diet

The domain provides statistics on dietary energy and nutrient availability based on the FAO Supply Utilization Accounts (SUA); apparent intake based on Household Consumption and Expenditure Surveys (HCES); intake based on individual-level dietary intake surveys; and statistics related to the Minimum Dietary Diversity for Women (MDD-W) indicator.

- World Census of Agriculture

Contains structural data from agricultural censuses conducted since the 1930s, under the decennial World Programme for the Census of Agriculture. Structural data include the size and number of agricultural holdings, the holder's gender, the type of land tenure, the legal status of holders, as well as information on the number of parcels and farm labour.

- SDG Indicators

The FAOSTAT domain on SDG Indicators is a parallel source to the global SDG database administered by the United Nations Statistical Division, as well as FAO's SDG indicators portal, which provides access to the available data for the 21 SDG indicators for which FAO is the custodian agency.

- Forestry

Annual production and trade data for numerous forest products, primarily wood products such as roundwood, sawnwood, wood-based panels, pulp and paper and paperboard.
