= Lists of countries by mineral production =

The following list creates a summary of the two major producers of different minerals (and coal, which is generally not considered a mineral).

== Summary ==
=== Fossil fuels ===
Fossil fuel	Largest producer	Second largest producer	Complete list
Coal	China	India	List of countries by coal production
Natural gas	United States	Russia	List of countries by natural gas production
Petroleum	United States	Russia	List of countries by oil production

=== Nuclear fuel ===
Nuclear fuel	Largest producer	Second largest producer	Complete list
Uranium	Kazakhstan	Canada	List of countries by uranium production
Thorium	India	China	Occurrence of thorium

=== Gemstones ===
Gem	Largest producer	Second largest producer	Complete list
Fluorite	China	Mexico	List of countries by fluorite production
Diamond	Russia	Botswana	List of countries by diamond production

=== Metals ===
Metal	Largest producer	Second largest producer
Aluminium	China	India
Bismuth	China	Vietnam
Copper	Chile	Peru
Chromium	South Africa	Turkey
Gold	China	Australia
Iron ore	Australia	China
Lithium	Australia	Chile
Magnesium	China	Russia
Manganese	South Africa	China
Mercury	China	Mexico
Nickel	Indonesia	Philippines
Niobium	Brazil	Canada
Palladium	Russia	South Africa
Platinum	South Africa	Russia
Silver	Mexico	China
Tin	China	Indonesia
Titanium	China	Japan
Vanadium	China	Russia
Zinc	China	Peru

== Metals ==
=== Aluminium ===
This is a list of countries by primary aluminium production. Primary aluminium is produced from aluminium oxide which is obtained from bauxite and excludes recycled aluminium.

List of countries by primary aluminium production in thousands of tonnes (2022–24)
Country	Primary aluminium	Aluminium oxide	Bauxite	
Country	Primary aluminium	Aluminium oxide	Production	Reserves
World	72,000	142,000	450,000	29,000,000
Other countries	–	1,500	5,700	5,300,000
China	43,000	84,000	93,000	680,000
India	4,200	7,600	25,000	650,000
Russia	3,800	2,900	6,300	480,000
Canada	3,300	1,500	–	–
United Arab Emirates	2,700	2,400	–	–
Bahrain	1,600	–	–	–
Australia	1,500	18,000	100,000	3,500,000
Norway	1,300	–	–	–
Brazil	1,100	11,000	33,000	2,700,000
Malaysia	870	–	130	–
Iceland	780	–	–	–
Saudi Arabia	776	1,800	5,800	180,000
South Africa	718	–	–	–
United States	670	720	13.9	–
Iran	632	–	1,000	–
Qatar	638	–	–	–
Mozambique	576	–	14.6	–
France	410	–	118	–
Argentina	400	–	–	–
Oman	395	–	–	–
Germany	341	960	–	–
New Zealand	334	–	–	–
Egypt	260	–	–	–
Kazakhstan	259	1,400	4,900	280,000
Indonesia	224	1,300	32,000	2,800,000
Romania	191	–	–	–
Greece	187	860	1,200	–
Sweden	120	–	–	–
Turkey	82.0	320	3,200	69,000
Slovakia	71.9	–	–	–
Cameroon	62.8	–	–	–
Tajikistan	62.0	–	–	–
Ghana	55.6	–	773	–
Netherlands	45.0	–	–	–
Montenegro	43.2	–	442	–
Bosnia and Herzegovina	37.8	–	700	–
Azerbaijan	33.5	–	–	–
United Kingdom	31.3	–	–	–
Slovenia	19.2	–	–	–
Venezuela	8.4	–	–	–
Ireland	–	1,600	–	–
Jamaica	–	1,500	6,100	2,000,000
Vietnam	–	1,500	4,200	3,100,000
Spain	–	820	–	–
Guinea	–	300	130,000	7,400,000
Sierra Leone	–	–	974	–
Guyana	–	–	706	–
Dominican Republic	–	–	104	–
Pakistan	–	–	56.3	–
Colombia	–	–	48.0	–
Tanzania	–	–	40.9	–
Croatia	–	–	17.8	–

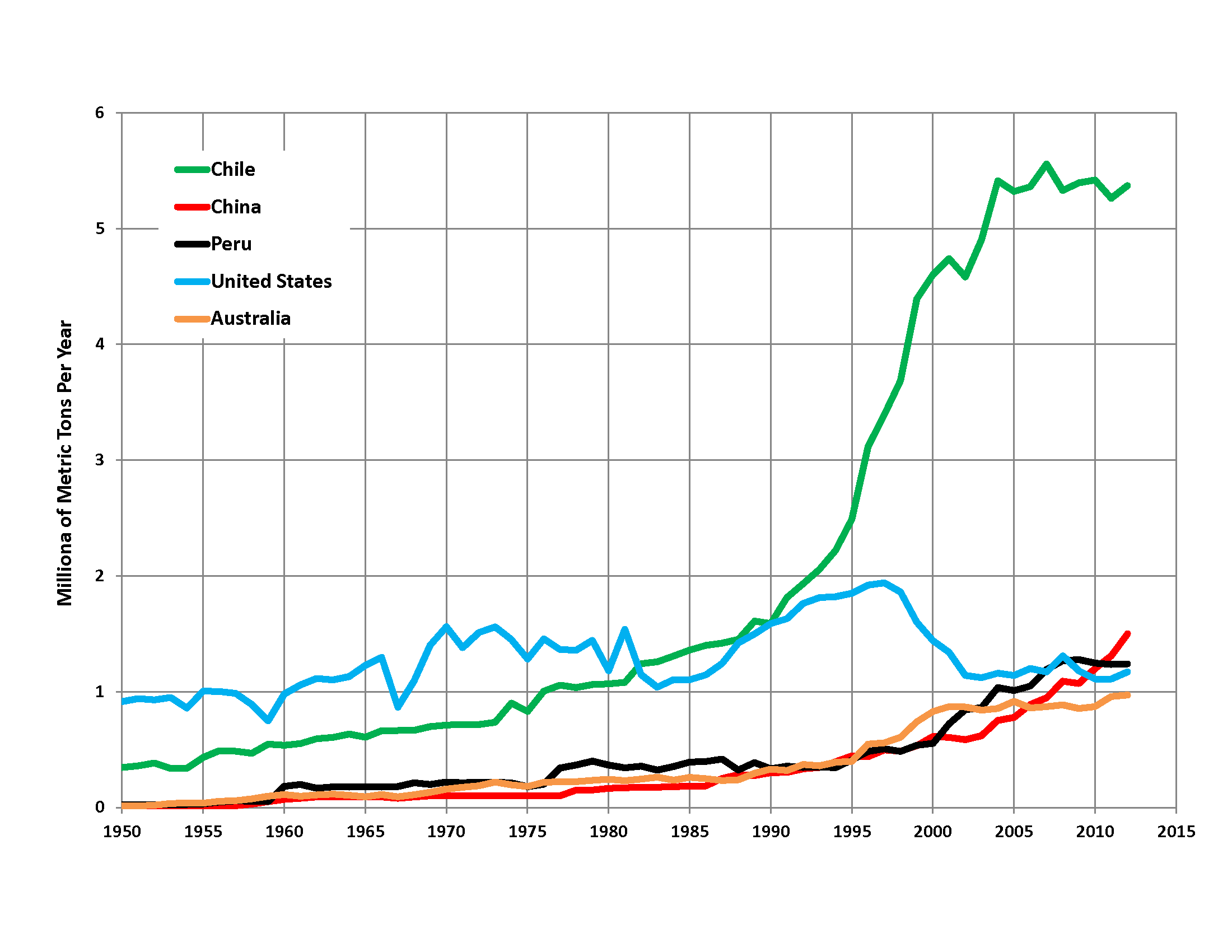
Production trends in the top five copper-producing countries, 1950-2012

=== Copper ===
List of countries by copper production in tonnes (2022–24)
Country	Production				Reserves
Country	Total	Mine	Refinery	Smelter	Reserves
World	70,769,394	23,000,000	27,000,000	20,769,394	980,000,000
Other countries	5,200,000	2,700,000	2,500,000	–	180,000,000
China	24,190,000	1,800,000	12,000,000	10,390,000	41,000,000
Chile	8,312,400	5,300,000	1,900,000	1,112,400	190,000,000
Congo (Kinshasa)	5,964,441	3,300,000	2,500,000	164,441	80,000,000
Peru	3,314,136	2,600,000	390,000	324,136	100,000,000
Russia	2,874,500	930,000	960,000	984,500	80,000,000
Japan	2,869,940	–	1,600,000	1,269,940	–
United States	2,370,500	1,100,000	890,000	380,500	47,000,000
Indonesia	1,722,464	1,100,000	350,000	272,464	21,000,000
Australia	1,650,300	800,000	460,000	390,300	100,000,000
Zambia	1,621,544	680,000	170,000	771,544	21,000,000
Poland	1,560,724	410,000	590,000	560,724	98,000,000
Kazakhstan	1,534,704	740,000	470,000	324,704	20,000,000
Mexico	1,335,438	700,000	350,000	285,438	53,000,000
South Korea	1,310,005	–	620,000	690,005	–
Canada	1,058,600	450,000	320,000	288,600	8,300,000
Germany	994,000	–	630,000	364,000	–
India	955,003	30,000	510,000	395,003	2,200,000
Iran	874,211	344,200	300,011	230,000	–
Spain	621,664	128,764	297,900	195,000	–
Bulgaria	606,000	67,000	229,000	310,000	–
Philippines	503,283	59,500	258,729	185,054	–
Sweden	466,137	88,337	217,800	160,000	–
Uzbekistan	445,500	148,500	148,500	148,500	–
Mongolia	426,166	416,430	9,736	–	–
Belgium	377,500	–	377,500	–	–
Brazil	366,253	297,653	8,600	60,000	–
Panama	350,438	350,438	–	–	–
Turkey	333,605	115,000	134,600	84,005	–
Serbia	258,663	203,998	24,665	30,000	–
Tanzania	233,000	118,000	–	115,000	–
Finland	180,850	27,553	18,094	135,203	–
Austria	167,003	–	107,000	60,003	–
Ecuador	120,000	120,000	–	–	–
Saudi Arabia	75,000	75,000	–	–	–
Vietnam	74,709	34,709	20,000	20,000	–
Armenia	66,132	66,132	–	–	–
Laos	50,370	43,766	6,604	–	–
South Africa	49,194	49,194	–	–	–
Botswana	44,269	44,269	–	–	–
Namibia	39,266	2,036	–	37,230	–
Norway	36,950	–	18,475	18,475	–
Portugal	32,098	32,098	–	–	–
Pakistan	28,571	16,346	–	12,225	–
Morocco	28,000	28,000	–	–	–
Eritrea	17,098	17,098	–	–	–
Argentina	14,000	–	14,000	–	17,100,000
Mauritania	13,313	13,313	–	–	–
Romania	11,600	11,600	–	–	–
Zimbabwe	10,168	10,168	–	–	–
Italy	9,900	–	9,900	–	–
Colombia	7,800	7,800	–	–	–
North Macedonia	7,693	7,093	600	–	–
Kyrgyzstan	7,500	7,500	–	–	–
Georgia	6,364	6,364	–	–	–
Albania	5,899	5,899	–	–	–
Dominican Republic	5,360	5,360	–	–	–
Bolivia	5,008	3,608	1,400	–	–
Egypt	4,000	–	4,000	–	–
Azerbaijan	2,516	2,516	–	–	–
Ukraine	2,400	–	2,400	–	–
North Korea	2,000	2,000	–	–	–
Tajikistan	1,206	1,206	–	–	–
Slovakia	30	30	–	0	–

=== Gold ===
Gold production

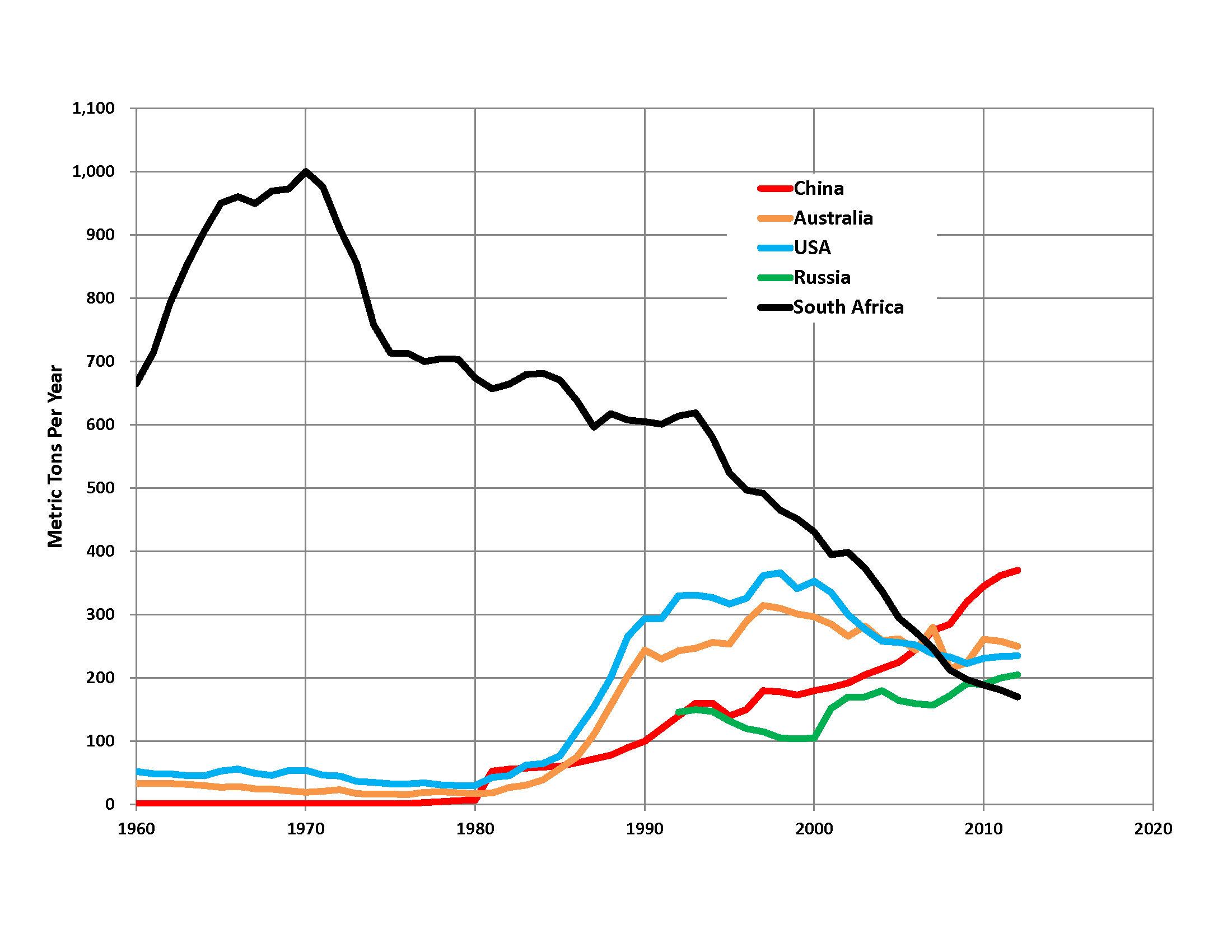
Trends in five of the top seven gold-producing countries

This is a list of countries by gold production in 2024. All production figures refer to primary mine production only (i.e., newly mined gold), excluding recycled gold. Until 2006, South Africa was the world's largest gold producer. In 2007, increasing production from other countries and declining production from South Africa meant that China became the largest producer, although no country has approached the scale of South Africa's period of peak production during the late 1960s and early 1970s. In 1970, South Africa produced 995 tonnes or 32 million ounces of gold, two-thirds of the world's production of 47.5 million ounces.

List of countries by gold production and reserves in tonnes (2024)
Country	Gold production	% of total	Reserves	% of total
World	3,300	100.0	64,000	100.0
Other countries	780	23.6	9,200	14.4
China	380	11.5	3,100	4.8
Russia	310	9.4	12,000	18.8
Australia	290	8.8	12,000	18.8
Canada	200	6.1	3,200	5.0
United States	160	4.8	3,000	4.7
Kazakhstan	130	3.9	2,300	3.6
Mexico	130	3.9	1,400	2.2
Ghana	130	3.9	1,000	1.6
Uzbekistan	120	3.6	1,800	2.8
South Africa	100	3.0	5,000	7.8
Indonesia	100	3.0	3,600	5.6
Peru	100	3.0	2,500	3.9
Brazil	70	2.1	2,400	3.8
Mali	70	2.1	800	1.3
Colombia	60	1.8	700	1.1
Tanzania	60	1.8	400	0.6
Burkina Faso	60	1.8	–	–

=== Iron ===
This is a list of countries by mined iron ore production in 2024 based on U.S. Geological Survey data. "Usable iron ore" figures refer to the processed ore product suitable for steelmaking, not the raw extracted material. As such, countries with lower-grade ores like China extensively beneficiate magnetite ores (typically <30% Fe) to produce market-grade material (~60% Fe), making their usable ore output appear comparable to high-grade producers like Australia or Brazil. However, the efficiency, cost, and environmental impact of such beneficiation vary significantly.

List of countries by iron ore production and reserves (2022–24)
Country	Production (thousand tonnes)			Reserves (million tonnes)	
Country	Usable iron ore	Pig iron	Iron content	Crude ore	Iron content
World	2,500,000	≈ 1,366,000	1,600,000	200,000	88,000
Other countries	≈ 13,450	–	37,000	17,000	8,500
Australia	930,000	3,700	580,000	58,000	27,000
Brazil	440,000	25,700	280,000	34,000	15,000
China	270,000	871,000	170,000	20,000	6,900
India	270,000	86,300	170,000	5,500	3,400
Russia	91,000	54,600	53,000	35,000	14,000
Iran	90,000	36,400	59,000	3,800	1,500
South Africa	66,000	2,600	42,000	930	590
Japan	–	63,000	–	–	–
Canada	54,000	7,300	32,000	6,000	2,300
United States	48,000	20,600	30,000	3,600	2,300
Ukraine	42,000	–	26,000	6,500	2,300
Kazakhstan	30,000	–	9,200	2,500	900
Sweden	28,000	2,900	20,000	1,300	600
Peru	21,000	–	14,000	2,600	1,500
Chile	18,000	581	11,000	–	–
Turkey	18,000	9,100	11,000	150	99
Mauritania	15,000	–	9,400	–	–
Taiwan	–	13,400	–	–	–
France	–	8,200	–	–	–
Mexico	8,000	8,428	5,000	–	–
Mongolia	7,660	–	–	–	–
Saudi Arabia	–	6,700	–	–	–
Netherlands	–	5,500	–	–	–
Liberia	5,000	–	–	–	–
United Kingdom	–	4,779	–	–	–
Malaysia	4,912	800	–	–	–
Sierra Leone	4,370	–	–	–	–
New Zealand	4,000	600	–	–	–
Slovakia	–	4,000	–	–	–
Indonesia	3,500	3,000	–	–	–
Italy	–	3,500	–	–	–
Argentina	–	3,494	–	–	–
Czech Republic	–	3,400	–	–	–
Spain	200	3,400	–	–	–
Austria	3,237	5,800	–	–	–
Poland	–	3,089	–	–	–
North Korea	3,000	150	–	–	–
Finland	–	1,900	–	–	–
Vietnam	1,843	10,000	–	–	–
Norway	1,800	70	–	–	–
Oman	–	1,800	–	–	–
Laos	1,795	–	–	–	–
Trinidad and Tobago	–	1,700	–	–	–
Qatar	–	1,600	–	–	–
Bahrain	–	1,500	–	–	–
Romania	–	1,500	–	–	–
Serbia	–	1,500	–	–	–
Bosnia and Herzegovina	1,286	757	–	–	–
Libya	–	1,100	–	–	–
Venezuela	1,000	277	–	–	–
Albania	–	809	–	–	–
Algeria	750	3,900	–	–	–
Pakistan	617	–	–	–	–
Hungary	–	500	–	–	–
Colombia	498	213	–	–	–
Germany	470	23,600	–	–	–
South Korea	434	45,200	–	–	–
Bolivia	372	–	–	–	–
Guinea	304	–	– 120.0	–	–
Tunisia	260	–	–	–	–
Thailand	190	–	–	–	–
Uganda	103	–	–	–	–
Philippines	75.77	–	–	–	–
Morocco	50.00	–	–	–	–
Paraguay	–	40	–	–	–
Egypt	12.00	6,000	–	–	–
Nigeria	5.00	–	–	–	–
Bhutan	3.49	–	–	–	–
Malawi	0.98	–	–	–	–
Guatemala	0.06	–	–	–	–
Ivory Coast	0.01				

=== Nickel ===
List of countries by nickel production in tonnes
Country	Production		Reserves	Year
Country	Mine	Smelter / refinery	Reserves	Year
World	3,700,000	3,200,000	130,000,000	2024
Indonesia	2,200,000	1,225,090	55,000,000	2022/24
Philippines	330,000	–	4,800,000	2024
Russia	210,000	143,000	8,300,000	2022/24
Canada	190,000	143,266	2,200,000	2022/24
China	120,000	850,000	4,400,000	2022/24
Australia	110,000	96,500	24,000,000	2022/24
New Caledonia	110,000	66,220	7,100,000	2022/24
Brazil	77,000	63,400	16,000,000	2022/24
Guatemala	48,200	18,000	–	2022
Colombia	46,400	41,816	–	2022
Finland	44,921	91,466	–	2022
Cuba	42,800	13,700	–	2022
Madagascar	35,737	35,737	–	2022
Papua New Guinea	34,302	–	–	2022
Dominican Republic	29,223	27,610	–	2022
South Africa	29,033	40,000	–	2022
Ivory Coast	24,500	–	–	2022
Turkey	14,535	–	–	2022
Zimbabwe	13,753	–	–	2022
Myanmar	10,000	10,000	–	2022
North Macedonia	–	8,400	–	2022
United States	8,000	–	310,000	2024
Ukraine	–	7,400	–	2022
Zambia	4,059	–	–	2022
Greece	1,700	1,400	–	2022
Albania	1,574	–	–	2022
Cyprus	–	953	–	2022
Poland	830	–	–	2022
Austria	–	700	–	2022
Kosovo	387	–	–	2022
Norway	200	81,898	–	2022
Morocco	200	100	–	2022

=== Silver ===
List of countries by silver production in tonnes
Country	Production	Reserves	Year
World	25,790	640,000	2024
Other countries	566	57,000	2022/24
Mexico	6,300	37,000	2024
China	3,300	70,000	2024
Peru	3,100	140,000	2024
Chile	1,200	26,000	2024
Poland	1,300	61,000	2024
Australia	1,000	94,000	2024
Bolivia	1,300	22,000	2024
Russia	1,200	92,000	2024
United States	1,100	23,000	2024
Kazakhstan	1,000	–	2024
Argentina	800	6,500	2024
India	800	8,000	2024
Sweden	400	–	2024
Canada	300	4,900	2024
Indonesia	299	–	2022
Uzbekistan	218	–	2022
Morocco	200	–	2022
Turkey	96.1	–	2023
Panama	87.5	–	2022
Papua New Guinea	84.0	–	2022
Brazil	80.0	–	2022
Portugal	78.4	–	2022
Dominican Republic	73.4	–	2022
Mongolia	65.4	–	2022
Spain	114	–	2023
Philippines	56.2	–	2022
Greece	50.0	–	2022
Iran	50.0	–	2022
North Korea	50.0	–	2022
Eritrea	49.9	–	2022
South Africa	45.7	–	2022
Bulgaria	38.0	–	2022
Honduras	37.0	–	2022
Finland	36.4	–	2022
Colombia	35.8	–	2022
Botswana	31.2	–	2022
Georgia	22.4	–	2022
Nicaragua	21.6	–	2022
Laos	21.3	–	2022
Kyrgyzstan	20.0	–	2022
Armenia	18.4	–	2022
Romania	18.0	–	2022
North Macedonia	15.0	–	2022
Tanzania	13.6	–	2022
Azerbaijan	12.6	–	2022
Ivory Coast	12.0	–	2022
Serbia	12.0	–	2022
Tajikistan	11.0	–	2022
Zambia	9.0	–	2022
Burkina Faso	7.3	–	2022
Saudi Arabia	7.0	–	2022
Namibia	5.0	–	2022
South Korea	4.4	–	2022
New Zealand	3.9	–	2022
DR Congo	3.4	–	2022
Mali	3.0	–	2022
Japan	2.9	–	2022
Ireland	2.8	–	2022
Ecuador	2.0	–	2022
Zimbabwe	1.5	–	2022
Senegal	1.3	–	2022
United Kingdom	1.3	–	2022
Ghana	1.0	–	2022
Sudan	1.0	–	2022
Germany	0.700	–	2022
Malaysia	0.481	–	2022
Fiji	0.475	–	2022
Slovakia	0.354	–	2022
Nigeria	0.200	–	2022
Niger	0.029	–	2022

=== Tin ===
* indicates "Natural resources of COUNTRY or TERRITORY" links.

List of countries by tin production in tonnes
Country	Production		Reserves	Year
Country	Mine	Smelter	Reserves	Year
World	300,000	389,000	4,200,000	2022/24
Other countries	1,800	–	310,000	2024
China *	69,000	200,500	1,000,000	2022/24
Indonesia *	50,000	74,000	–	2022/24
Myanmar *	34,000	–	700,000	2024
Peru *	31,000	26,630	130,000	2022/24
Brazil *	29,000	17,200	420,000	2022/24
Congo *	25,000	–	120,000	2024
Bolivia	21,000	14,834	400,000	2022/24
Australia	9,900	106	620,000	2022/24
Belgium	–	8,200	–	2022
Nigeria *	7,000	–	–	2024
Vietnam *	6,700	5,500	23,000	2022/24
Poland	–	4,275	–	2022
Taiwan	–	4,200	–	2022
Rwanda *	3,600	643	–	2022/24
Malaysia *	3,000	19,385	–	2022/24
Russia *	3,000	2,500	460,000	2022/24
Japan	–	1,551	–	2022
Laos *	1,500	–	–	2024
Namibia	522	–	–	2022
Tanzania	404	–	–	2022
Spain	314	–	–	2022
Burundi	99	–	–	2022
Thailand	84	9,526	–	2022
Portugal	60	–	–	2022
Mongolia	46	–	–	2022
India	28	–	–	2022

=== Zinc ===
List of countries by zinc production in tonnes
Country	Production		Reserves	Year
Country	Mine	Slab	Reserves	Year
World	12,000,000	13,338,278	230,000,000	2022/24
Other countries	–	–	25,000,000	2024
China	4,000,000	6,358,100	46,000,000	2022/24
Peru	1,300,000	349,500	20,000,000	2022/24
Australia	1,100,000	385,029	64,000,000	2022/24
India	860,000	683,903	9,800,000	2022/24
United States	750,000	220,000	9,200,000	2022/24
Mexico	700,000	337,020	14,000,000	2022/24
Japan	–	516,638	–	2022
Bolivia	510,000	–	–	2024
Kazakhstan	370,000	266,300	7,600,000	2022/24
Russia	310,000	195,000	29,000,000	2022/24
Belgium	–	260,000	–	2022
Sweden	240,000	–	3,900,000	2024
Turkey	186,000	–	–	2022
Portugal	182,262	–	–	2022
Norway	–	181,139	–	2022
Netherlands	–	180,100	–	2022
Brazil	150,000	233,700	–	2022
Iran	150,000	140,000	–	2022
Eritrea	120,529	–	–	2022
South Africa	120,000	–	5,900,000	2024
Canada	116,533	587,000	–	2022
Germany	–	110,900	–	2022
France	–	109,300	–	2022
Mongolia	103,600	–	–	2022
Ireland	103,300	–	–	2022
Italy	–	96,100	–	2022
Spain	82,963	505,000	–	2022
Finland	62,433	294,122	–	2022
Tajikistan	59,056	–	–	2022
Cuba	52,000	–	–	2022
Pakistan	42,349	–	–	2022
Uzbekistan	42,000	90,000	–	2022
Namibia	40,500	–	–	2022
Nigeria	40,000	–	–	2022
Morocco	35,000	–	–	2022
North Macedonia	29,625	–	–	2022
North Korea	28,000	15,000	–	2022
Honduras	25,000	–	–	2022
Saudi Arabia	24,700	–	–	2022
Chile	24,092	–	–	2022
Burkina Faso	23,200	–	–	2022
Congo	20,000	–	–	2022
Laos	18,000	–	–	2022
Vietnam	14,000	10,000	–	2022
Bulgaria	13,762	72,527	–	2022
DR Congo	13,578	–	–	2022
Myanmar	12,000	–	–	2022
Indonesia	11,400	–	–	2022
Greece	10,502	–	–	2022
Montenegro	9,038	–	–	2022
Romania	7,000	–	–	2022
Serbia	6,500	–	–	2022
Poland	6,300	161,900	–	2022
Armenia	5,967	–	–	2022
Kosovo	5,718	–	–	2022
Bosnia and Herzegovina	5,629	–	–	2022
Dominican Republic	5,485	–	–	2022
Georgia	4,412	–	–	2022
South Korea	3,959	980,000	–	2022
Argentina	3,893	–	–	2022
Algeria	900	–	–	2022
Zambia	400	–	–	2022
Slovakia	95	–	–	2022

== See also ==
- Lists of mines
- List of countries by lithium production
- List of countries by palladium production
- Magnesium production by country
- Manganese production by country
- Titanium production by country
