= North Korean economic reform =

Economic reforms in North Korea

The North Korean economic reform refers to the program of reform and restructuring of the North Korean economy. Economic reforms have been increasing in the last years, particularly after Kim Jong Un came to power in 2012.

== History ==
Economic reforms in North Korea has its roots to the 1970s, when North Korean government agencies, provincial governments and military units were unofficially granted permission to establish their own companies. The number of such companies has increased dramatically since the 2000s.

After the Korean War, Kim Il Sung focused on modernizing its economy through Soviet and Chinese aid. His most notable economic reform, such as the one in 1992, was prompted by external and internal factors, including the collapse of the Soviet Union. The reform was designed to bolster the country's self-reliance and appeal to foreign investors, representing a cautious embrace of market-oriented policies. The amendment to the Constitution in 1992 included a provision of Article 37, which laid the ground for the "open-door" policy. Article 37 established that "[t]he State shall encourage institutions, enterprises or associations of the DPRK to establish and operate equity and contractual joint venture enterprises with corporations or individuals of foreign countries."

In 1998, Kim Jong Il revised the Constitution to consolidate power and address economic difficulties. The revisions expanded ownership rights to include social organizations alongside the state and cooperatives, reducing state control and fostering a more conducive environment for private ownership. This shift allowed citizens to engage in legal and economic activities and earn income, marking a significant departure towards a rudimentary market economy. Furthermore, the protection of intellectual property rights was introduced, underscoring the government's recognition of the importance of innovation and creativity in economic development. Despite these reforms, North Korea remained committed to its socialist principles, particularly the pursuit of self-sufficiency. The collapse of the Soviet Union in the 1990s necessitated a loosening of central control, as resource shortages compelled the government to grant more autonomy to lower units and individuals. This decentralization of authority led to a weakening of bureaucratic coherence, the disintegration of party structures, and an increase in corruption among officials.

Post-1998, the government shifted its focus towards ensuring political stability, restructuring governance, and promoting economic recovery. Policies were implemented to empower state entities and localities, acknowledging the altered power dynamics within the country. However, economic challenges persisted, prompting individuals and businesses to seek greater independence from state control. In the 21st century, under Kim Jong Un's regime, a new phase of economic reform was initiated by introducing the 'socialist enterprise responsibility management system.' This system aimed to enhance the efficiency of state-owned enterprises, particularly within the industrial sector, through measures such as granting autonomy in production planning, pricing, and revenue management. Additionally, enterprises were given greater flexibility in managing residual revenue and making investments, reflecting a partial embrace of market mechanisms.

In 2020 North Korea halted its economic reforms that were seen as a risky gambit to unleash market forces, and the government shifted back its focus towards more central planning and state control over the economy.

In 2023, legislation passed requiring all banks and shops to accept electronic payments.

== Economic impact ==
North Korea's economic growth between 2011 and 2017 is estimated to be ranging from 1 percent to 5 percent. North Korea expert Andrei Lankov has said that North Korea's real growth rate is 3–4%.

North Korean economic growth has generally been quite slow as a result of sanctions, a lack of foreign investment, and the COVID-19 pandemic. The country saw the economy contract by 0.2% in 2022, 0.1% in 2021, and 4.5% in 2020. While scholars debate the validity of certain economic reports, the Bank of Korea (South Korea’s Central Bank) reported that North Korea’s economic reforms have been largely successful in recent years. 2023 saw the fastest real Gross Domestic Product (GDP) growth in seven years at an increase of 3.1% as estimated by the Bank of Korea.

While economic reforms seem to be effective, as a whole, based on North Korea’s now rising economic growth, individual reforms have had their struggles. North Korea attempted to solve their food shortage problem that they had by allowing farmers to keep more of the goods they produce. This idea was a mimic of China's public policies but was largely ineffective because China’s agriculture was more chemical based, yielding higher quantities of crops. The domestic food output is now recovering but extremely slowly.

Reforms seem to have been effective in bolstering North Korean citizens’ access to food. Pork is viewed as a product of luxury in North Korea. According to a survey by Seoul National University (SNU), which compiled information for eight years of newly arrived North Korean refugees in South Korea. The survey showed that the number of people who could afford pork “1-2 times a week” increased from 25.4% in 2011-14 to 45.1% in 2018-2020. Upon taking power, only a quarter of Kim Jong-Un’s population were eating pork, but after the North Korean dictator implemented economic reforms, almost half of the nation could afford pork. Access to other luxuries increased following economic reforms, the SNU survey shows that in 2019, 91% of households had a TV set, 36.4% had refrigerators and 23.6% had washing machines, which is a stark increase from 2010. The data, as a whole, points out that prior to Kim Jung-Un’s reduction of economic openness reforms, the country saw a greater access to food and, otherwise, luxury items.

Following the economic hardships of COVID-19, North Korea began developing rural areas. There was a recent investment in consumer goods to improve the living standards in rural and urban areas, which has been met with dissent, questioning if the government can meet these standards because of a lack of labor and raw materials. The government also lacks funds to invest in the capital needed to complete this project. The North Korean goal is to develop factories in 20 different cities over the span of 10 years. The economic impact of such reforms are unclear due to the recency of these policies, but there is promise that they will benefit the North Korean economy overall.

== Foreign encouragement ==
Economic reforms in North Korea has been encouraged by China. While visiting Pyongyang in June 2019, Chinese paramount leader Xi Jinping said that Kim Jong Un had “initiated a new strategic line of economic development and improving people’s livelihoods, raising socialist construction in the country to a new high tide.”

== See also ==
- Reform and opening up
