= Journal of Asian Economics =

Academic journal

- Subject: Economy of Asia
- Language: English
- Edited by: Shiyi Chen

Publication details
- History: 1990–present
- Publisher: Elsevier
- Frequency: Bimonthly
- Impact factor: 1.797 (2019)

Standard abbreviations
- ISO 4: J. Asian Econ.

Indexing
- ISSN: 1049-0078
- LCCN: 90644980
- OCLC no.: 890209521

Links
- Journal homepage; Online access; Online archive

The Journal of Asian Economics is a bimonthly peer-reviewed academic journal focused on the economy of Asia. It was established in 1990 by the American Committee on Asian Economic Studies, and was published on the committee's behalf by Elsevier through the June 2020 issue. As the flagship of the American Committee on Asian Economic Studies (ACAES), the Journal was produced in service to the ACAES mission of promoting economic research on Asia and fostering engagement between Asian economists and their counterparts in the rest of the world. During its 30-year history under ACAES, the Journal was helmed by three editors-in-chief: founder Manoranjan Dutta (1990-2007); Michael Plummer (2007-2015); and Calla Wiemer (2015-2020). These Editors-in-Chief were chosen by the ACAES governing body for their dedication to the ACAES mission.

As of the August 2020 issue, Elsevier has severed the Journal's relationship with ACAES. The Journal is now managed by Elsevier Beijing Ltd. which has authority in appointing the editor. The current editor-in-chief is Shiyi Chen (Fudan University).

According to the Journal Citation Reports, the journal has a 2018 impact factor of 1.111.
