= Taep'oong International Investment Group of Korea =

State-linked North Korean investment company

- Hangul: 조선 대풍 국제 투자 그룹
- Hanja: 朝鮮大豊 國際 投資 그룹
- Revised Romanization: Joseon Daepung gukje tuja geurup
- McCune–Reischauer: Chosŏn Taep'ung kukche t'uja kŭrup

The Taep'oong International Investment Group of Korea is a Pyongyang-based North Korean company established by the National Defence Commission of North Korea. It officially manages the oversea investments to North Korea. Three of the seven members of board of directors were Kim Jong-il's personal financial managers.

== Activities ==
- Pak Chŏlsu, the head representative of Taep'oong provided 10 investors from Hong Kong a tour to the Kaesong Industrial Region in May 2010.
- Despite the ongoing tension, the Taep'oong has proposed a co-operative solution to the remaining assets of South Korean Hyundai's Mount Kumgang Tourist Region in North Korean territories.
