= List of countries by salt production =

This is a list of countries by salt production. The six leading salt producers in the world, China, the United States, India, Germany, Canada, and Australia, account for more than half of the worldwide production. The first table includes data by the British Geological Survey (BGS) for countries with available statistics. The second table includes data by the United States Geological Survey (USGS) for the leading producers.

== Lists ==
Click on one of the small triangles in the headings to re-order the list according to that category.

List of countries by salt production (metric tonnes)
BGS (2022)
USGS (2024)

Country/Region	Production
World	281,111,172
China	53,598,800
United States	42,000,000
India	25,930,434
Germany	16,077,534
Bangladesh	16,000,000
Australia	13,000,000
Canada	12,535,864
Chile	10,501,352
Turkey	9,085,711
Mexico	7,914,780
Russia	6,000,000
Netherlands	5,893,000
France	5,500,000
Poland	4,376,888
Spain	4,120,473
Iran	3,700,000
Djibouti	3,500,000
Bulgaria	3,400,000
United Kingdom	2,587,790
Saudi Arabia	2,400,000
Belarus	2,300,000
Pakistan	2,171,567
Tunisia	1,900,000
Thailand	1,737,090
Italy	1,460,833
Argentina	1,300,000
Romania	1,300,000
Namibia	1,157,299
Austria	1,119,398
Kazakhstan	1,112,456
Bosnia and Herzegovina	1,109,253
Peru	1,093,559
Indonesia	1,000,000
Ukraine	1,000,000
Philippines	993,000
Vietnam	987,000
Japan	897,000
Denmark	803,000
Bahamas	623,368
Brazil	609,801
Morocco	575,000
South Africa	571,774
Switzerland	423,000
Bonaire	400,000
Colombia	359,288
Botswana	323,303
Senegal	320,627
Eritrea	320,000
Uzbekistan	320,000
Ghana	300,000
Venezuela	300,000
Iraq	300,000
Israel	297,861
South Korea	250,000
Egypt	230,000
Turkmenistan	230,000
Angola	210,000
Greece	210,000
Cuba	195,600
Tanzania	181,818
Myanmar	162,000
Algeria	160,000
Portugal	125,853
Madagascar	120,000
Sudan	120,000
Sri Lanka	110,000
Mozambique	100,000
El Salvador	100,000
North Korea	100,000
Yemen	80,000
Taiwan	78,415
Ecuador	75,000
Guatemala	60,000
Honduras	60,000
Kuwait	58,000
Libya	50,000
Croatia	45,992
Jordan	42,000
Cambodia	40,000
Tajikistan	37,000
Nicaragua	30,000
Albania	30,000
Guinea	25,000
Kenya	23,215
Armenia	22,534
Afghanistan	21,663
Bolivia	20,000
New Zealand	18,000
Lebanon	15,000
Jamaica	14,000
Oman	11,500
Montenegro	10,000
Serbia	6,500
Mali	6,000
Burkina Faso	5,000
Azerbaijan	4,181
Syria	4,000
Slovenia	2,342
Mauritania	1,000
Ethiopia	800
Mauritius	674
Mongolia	394
Laos	188

Country/Region	Production
World	280,000,000
China	55,000,000
United States	40,000,000
Other countries	28,000,000
India	28,000,000
Germany	16,000,000
Australia	13,000,000
Canada	12,000,000
Chile	11,000,000
Mexico	9,000,000
Turkey	9,000,000
Russia	8,000,000
Brazil	6,600,000
Netherlands	6,000,000
France	5,000,000
Poland	4,600,000
Spain	4,000,000
Bulgaria	3,000,000
Pakistan	3,000,000
United Kingdom	2,800,000
Iran	2,700,000
Saudi Arabia	2,400,000
Egypt	2,300,000
Belarus	2,100,000
Italy	1,900,000
