= List of countries by fluorite production =

This is a list of countries by fluorite production based on the British Geological Survey.

* indicates "Natural resources of COUNTRY or TERRITORY" links.

Fluorite production by country (2022)
Country (or area)	Production (metric tonnes)
World	8,200,000
China *	5,700,000
Mexico	990,079
South Africa *	420,000
Vietnam *	217,975
Spain	203,768
Mongolia *	122,900
Iran	110,000
Germany	104,461
Morocco *	77,035
Kazakhstan	67,000
Thailand *	59,243
Russia *	32,000
Brazil *	28,969
Turkey *	17,252
United Kingdom *	13,000
Pakistan *	7,200
Argentina *	7,100
North Korea *	7,000
South Korea	5,020
Kyrgyzstan	4,000
Afghanistan	4,000
Egypt *	1,000
India *	988
