= Agriculture in Iran =

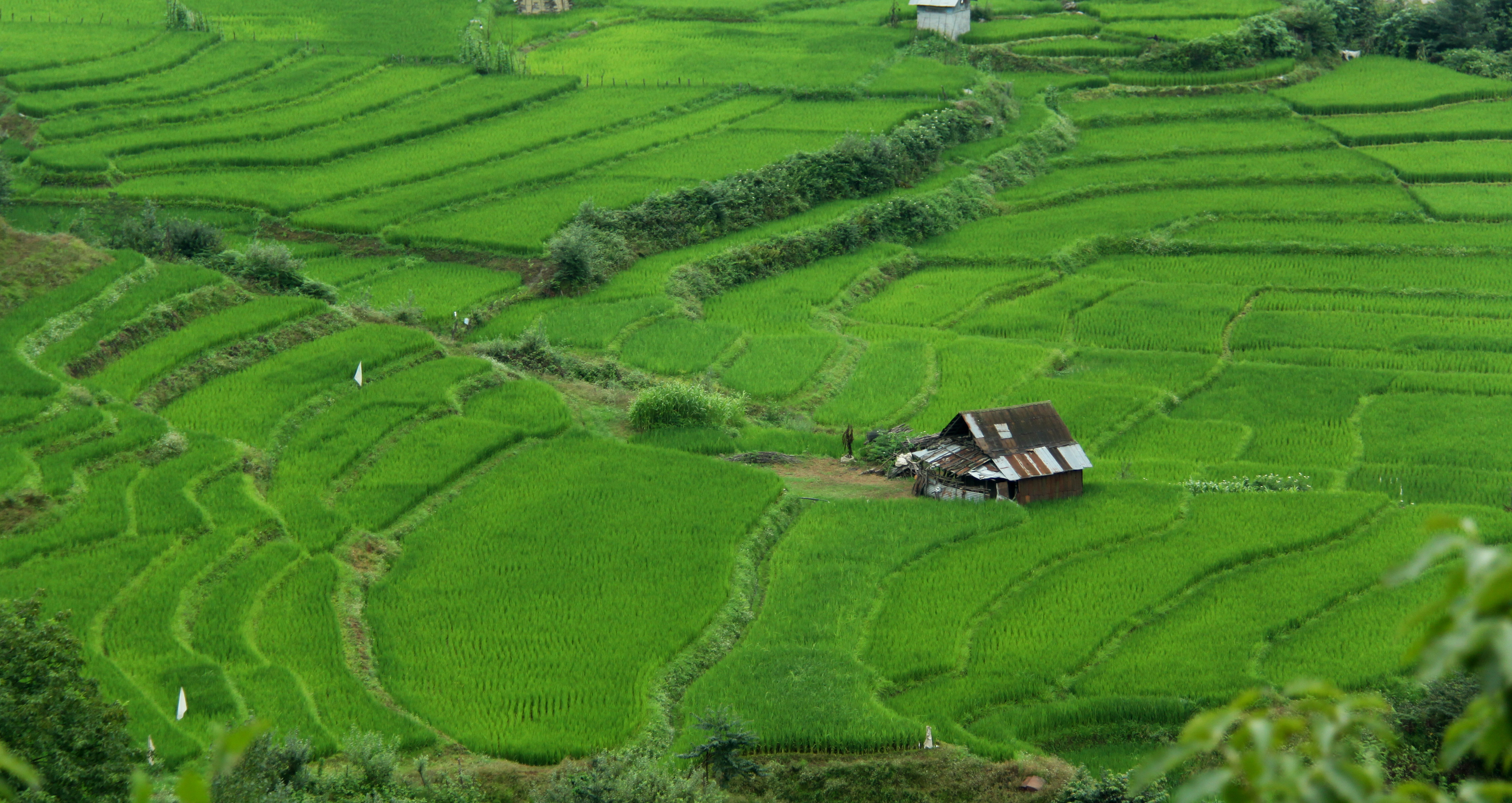
Rice field in Bandpey, North Iran

Agriculture in Iran is underdeveloped. While one-third of Iran's total surface area is suitable for farming, due to poor soil and inadequate water distribution, most of it is not cultivated. Less than one-third of the land planted with crops, orchards and vineyards is irrigated; the rest is devoted to dryland farming. The western and northwestern portions of the country have the most fertile soil. Iran's food security index stands at around 96 percent.

3% of the total land area is used for grazing and small-fodder production. Most of the grazing is done on semi-dry rangeland in mountain areas and areas surrounding the large deserts ("Dasht's") of Central Iran.

53 percent of Iran's land is non-agricultural terrain:

- 39% of the country is covered by deserts, salt flats ("kavirs") and bare-rock mountains, not suited for agricultural purposes.
- 7% of Iran's total surface is covered by woodlands.
- 7% is covered by cities, towns, villages, industrial areas and roads.

At the end of the 20th century, agricultural activities accounted for one-fifth of Iran's gross domestic product (GDP) and employed a comparable proportion of the workforce. Most farms are small, less than 25 acres (10 hectares), and are not economically viable, which has contributed to the wide-scale migration to cities. In addition to water scarcity and areas of poor soil, seed is of low quality and farming techniques are antiquated.

All these factors have contributed to low crop yields and poverty in rural areas. Further, after the 1979 revolution many agricultural workers claimed ownership rights and forcibly occupied large, privately owned farms where they had been employed. The legal disputes that arose from this situation remained unresolved through the 1980s, and many owners put off making large capital investments that would have improved farm productivity, further deteriorating production. Progressive government efforts and incentives during the 1990s, however, improved agricultural productivity marginally, helping Iran toward its goal of reestablishing national self-sufficiency in food production.

== Land use and irrigation ==
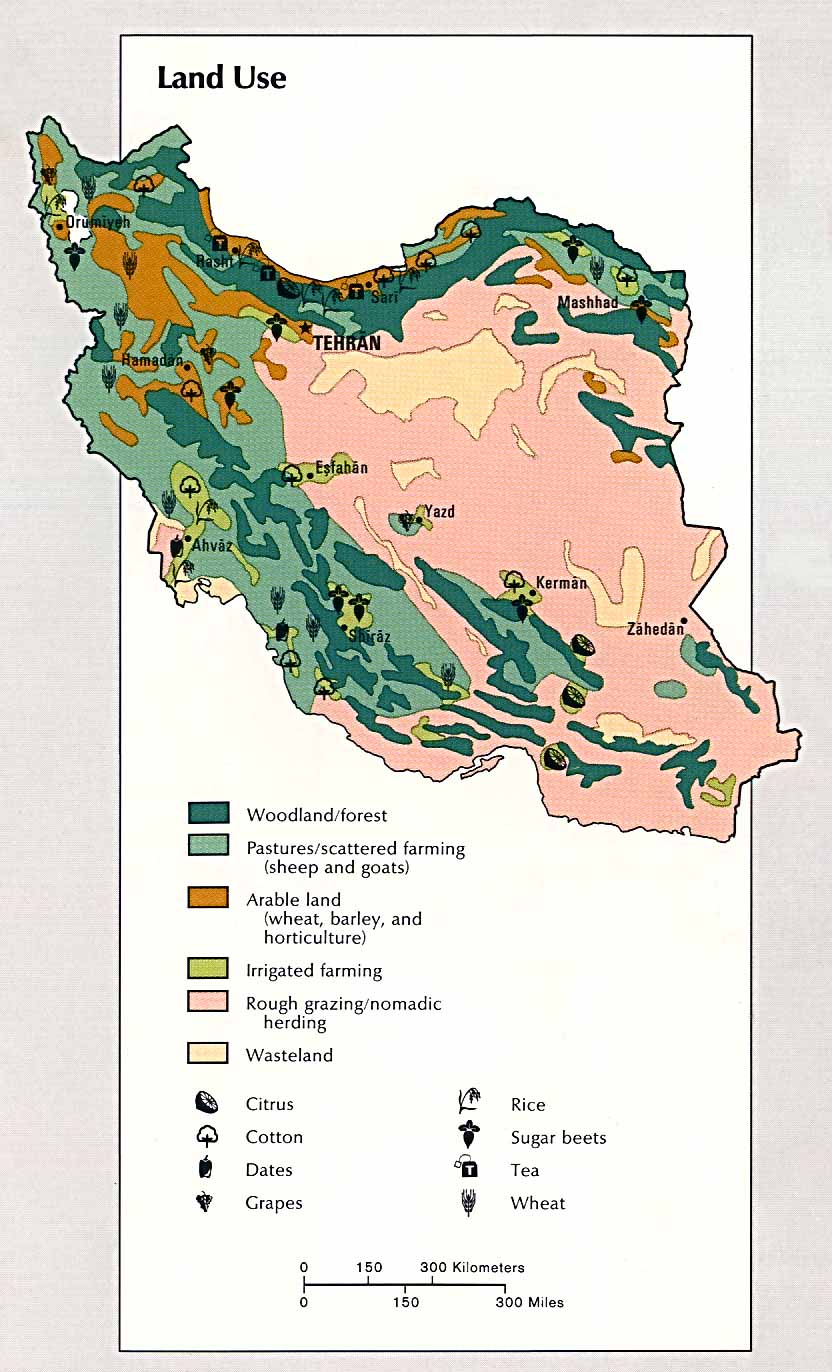
Land use in Iran

World average annual rainfall is 800 mm but in Iran the annual rainfall is only 220 mm. Overall, Iran's soil is not well suited for large scale agriculture. About 12 percent of the country's total land area of 1,636,000 km^{2} is cultivated. Still, 63% of the cultivable lands have not been used, and 185,000 km^{2} of the present farms are being used with 50 to 60% capacity.

Both irrigated and rain-fed farming are used in Iran. In 2005, some 13.05 million hectares of land were under cultivation, of which 50.45% was allocated to irrigated farming and the remaining 49.55% to rain-fed system. As of 2013, the amount of cultivated land that is irrigated has increased to 8 million hectares, while 10 million hectares remain rain-fed.

Rainfall & Agricultural Production
	March 2001	March 2003	March 2005	March 2007	March 2008	March 2009	March 2010	March 2011
Production (Million Ton)	65	80	87	97	92	70	91	99
Rainfall (Millimeter)	52	70	69	62	75	51	61	69

== Crops and plants ==
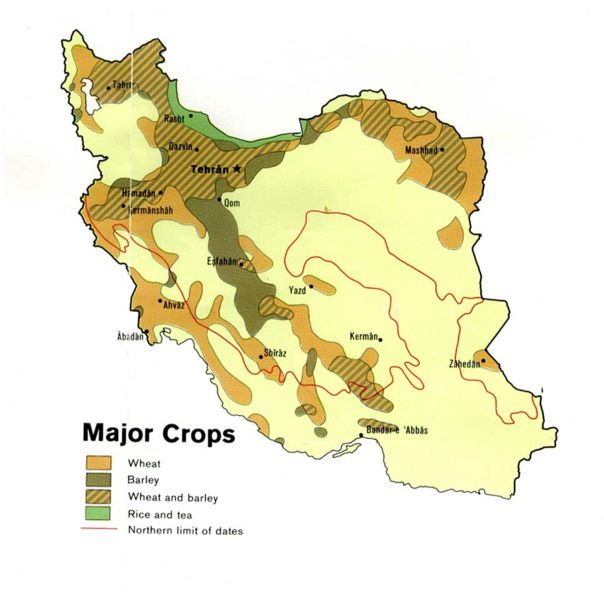
Map of Iran's major crops, circa 1978.

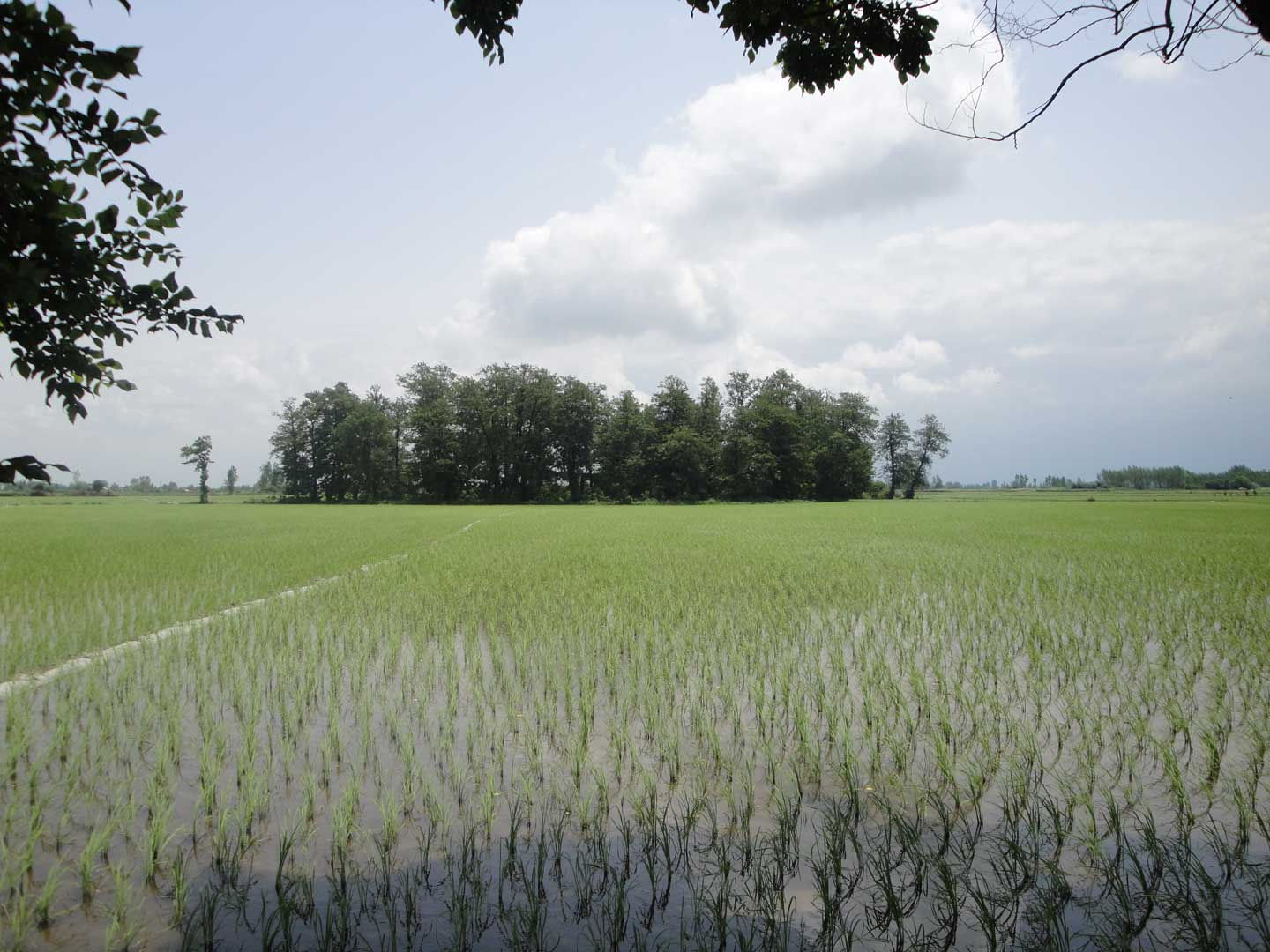
Rice paddy field in Amol

The wide range of temperature fluctuation in different parts of the country and the multiplicity of climatic zones make it possible to cultivate a diverse variety of crops, including cereals (wheat, barley, rice, and maize (corn)), fruits (dates, figs, pomegranates, melons, and grapes), vegetables, cotton, sugar beets, sugarcane and pistachios (World's largest producer with 40% of the world's output in 2005), nuts, olives, spices e.g. saffron (world's largest producer with 81% of the world's total output), raisin (world's third largest producer & second largest exporter), tea, tobacco, berberis (world's largest producer) and medicinal herbs. More than 2,000 plant species are grown in Iran; only 100 of which are being used in pharmaceutical industries. The land covered by Iran's natural flora is four times that of Europe.

Wheat, rice, and barley are the country's major crops. The Iranian grain sector is highly regulated. Producers receive subsidised access to input costs such as fertiliser and pesticides, as well as a guaranteed support price for their crops.

Wheat: In 2007 Iran exported close to 600,000 tonnes of wheat (out of a production of 15 million tonnes). In 2008, following a drought, Iran imported approximately 7 million tonnes of wheat.

Rice: Iran's total rice production stands at 2.2 million tons per annum whereas annual consumption is about three million tons (2008). Iran has imported about 630,000 tons of rice from UAE, Pakistan and Uruguay worth $271 million in 2008 and 1.4 million tons of rice, worth $800 million in 2009. Iran's rice imports dropped by 40% in 2010. Iran has 3,800 rice milling units (2009). The average per capita consumption of rice in Iran is 45.5 kg, which makes Iranians the 13th biggest rice consumers. Rice is mostly produced in northern Iran. Rice has been cultivated for many years in Mazandaran and Gilan Province of Iran. In Northern Province, many indica rice cultivars including Tarom, Gerdeh, Hashemi, Hasani, Neda and Gharib have been bred by farmers.

Sugar: In 2008, Iran had a shortage of 400,000 tons to 600,000 tons of sugar nationwide. Sugar companies suffered from massive imports of cheap sugar over the past few years, which led to a 50% drop in the capacity of the sugar industry's production in 2008. The lack of import tariffs was the main reason for the domestic sugar industry suffering in this manner.

Pistachio: Iran ranks as the world's largest pistachio producer and exporter followed by USA and Turkey. After oil and carpets, pistachios are Iran's biggest exports: about 200,000 tons for $840 million in 2008. More than 350,000 people earn a living from the nut, most of them in vast groves of the desert oases in southeast. Iran's share in the global pistachio market reached 50 percent in 2010.

Saffron: Saffron is cultivated in many regions of the country, the provinces of North Khorasan, Khorasan Razavi and South Khorasan in the northeast have the highest production share. Iran's saffron is exported to the United Arab Emirates, Spain, Japan, Turkmenistan, France, Italy and the US. The northeastern Khorasan Razavi province exported 57 tons of saffron worth $156.5 million to 41 countries in 2010.

Tea: Tea production rose to 190,000 tons in 2007 from 130,000 tons in 2004. 75,000 tons of tea is smuggled into Iran each year (2008).

Horticulture: Close to 19 million tons of horticultural crops will be produced by the end of Fourth Plan (2005–10).

Fruits: Iran exported more than 35,000 tons of citrus fruits valued at $20.8 million to 36 countries in 2008. Iran is among the largest producers of berries and stone fruits in the world, especially pomegranates, dates, figs and cherries. See also: Fruit in Iran.

== Livestock ==
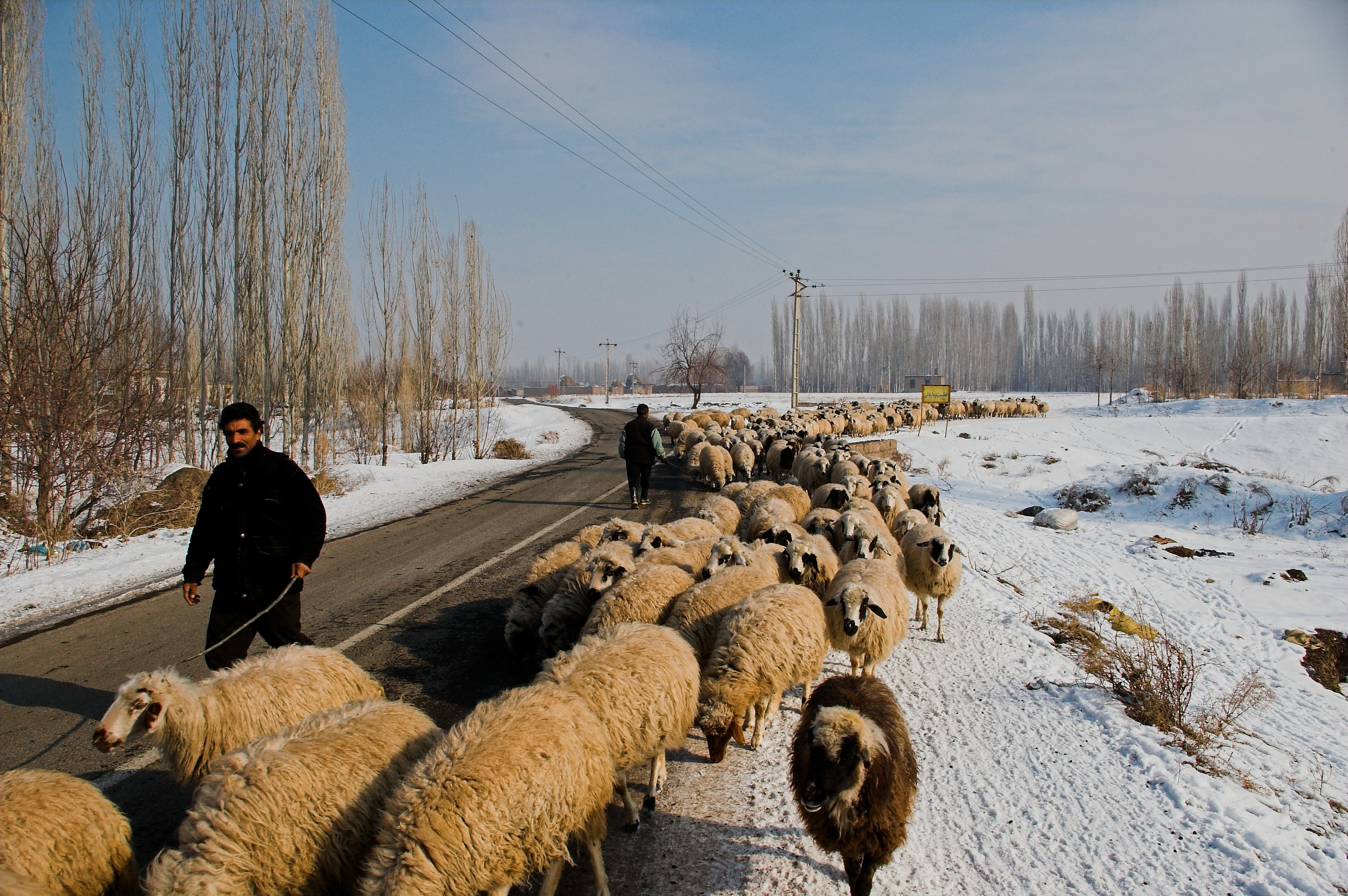
Iranian shepherds moving their sheep. North-western Iran, winter 2008.

Of the country's livestock, sheep are by far the most numerous, followed by goats, cattle, donkeys, horses, water buffalo, and mules. The raising of poultry for eggs and meat is prevalent. One area where production infrastructure has progressed rapidly is the poultry sector. The face of the industry has now been transformed dramatically so that the entire supply chain process can take place domestically.

Production of livestock increased over the past three years to reach 11.3 million tons in 2008 from the 10.6 million tons in 2007, and 9.9 million tons in 2006. Meat processing capacity is at 400,000 tons and 140 production units (2009). In 2008, per capita meat consumption was 26 kg.

== Fishing ==
Access to the Caspian Sea, the Persian Gulf, the Gulf of Oman, and many river basins provides Iran the potential to develop excellent fisheries. The government assumed control of commercial fishing in 1952. One government-owned enterprise, the Northern Sheelat Company, was established in 1952, and a second, the Southern Sheelat Company, was established in 1961. In recent years, illegal and off-season fishing, discharge of industrial and agricultural pollutants, overfishing by other Caspian littoral states, and other unfavorable conditions have endangered Caspian fish resources. Between 1990 and 2004, Iran's total annual Caspian Sea catch declined from 98,000 tons to 32,533 tons, including 463 tons of sturgeon, which yields high-quality caviar.

Iran has 1,786 kilometers of coastline on the Persian Gulf and the Gulf of Oman. These southern waters are rich in fish and other marine resources. In 2004 the catch off the southern coast totaled 299,000 tons. This represented an average annual increase of 12.6 percent since 1976. The southern catch either is used directly by households and restaurants or processed and preserved by industry. Expansion of the fishery infrastructure would enable the country to harvest an estimated 700,000 tons of fish annually from the southern waters. However, increased pollution from the oil industry and other enterprises poses a serious threat to this area's fishing industry.

Since the Revolution, increased attention has been focused on producing fish from inland waters. Between 1976 and 2004, the combined take from inland waters by the state and private sectors increased from 1,100 tons to 110,175 tons.

Some 692,000 tons of aquatics will be produced across the country by the end of the 2008, of which 236,000 tons would be bred and the rest fished from the sea. Per capita consumption of seafood in Iran will reach 8.5 kg by March 2009 and 10 kg a year later.

Caviar: Iranian caviar export is expected to reach $22 million by March 2009. Iran is the world's largest producer and exporter of caviar in the world, exporting more than 300 tonnes annually.

== Forestry ==
In 2005 Iran's forest area totaled about 11 million hectares, approximately 7 percent of the country's surface area. Adequate rainfall and a favorable climate have created 1.5 million hectares of dense forest in the Caspian region. The remainder is distributed among western forests (3.6 million hectares), southern forests (434,000 hectares), desert forests (620,000 hectares), and forests scattered in other locations. Supervised by the Department of Natural Resources, the Caspian forests produced 820,000 cubic meters of timber products in 2004, more than 90 percent of which was for industrial use. The largest and most valuable woodland areas are in the Caspian region and the northern slopes of the Elburz Mts., where many of the forests are commercially exploitable and include both hardwoods and softwoods. Although forests and pastures are nationalized and 12 percent of forested land is nominally protected, forest destruction by the private sector is routine. Limited forest areas, mismanagement, and destruction have compelled Iran to import lumber and wood products. In addition, forest fires destroy 20,000 hectares of forest area each year. Between 1954 and 2004, an estimated 41 percent of Iran's forest land was lost. According to the former director of Iran's Department of Environment (Iran), the rate of destruction of forestland amounts to 100,000 hectares per year.

== History ==
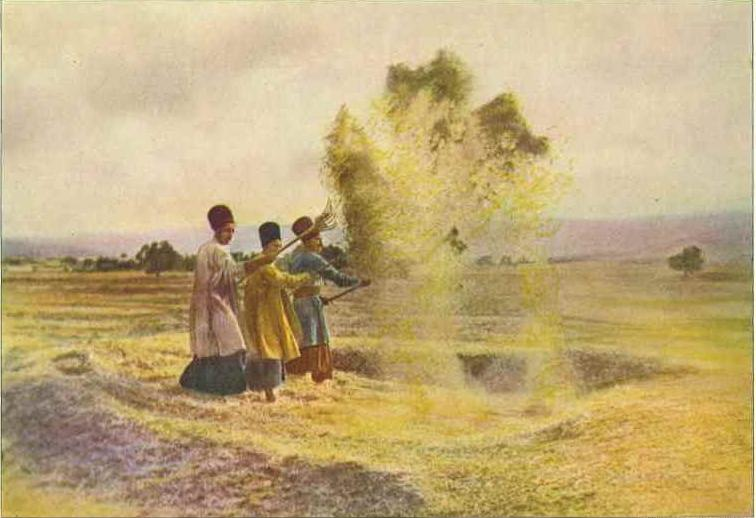
Colorized picture of farmers winnowing grain in Southern Iran, 1921.

Agriculture has a long history and tradition in Iran. As early as 10,000 BCE, the earliest known domestication of the goat had taken place in the Iranian plateau. By 5000BCE, wine was being fermented in Iran, and by as early as 7th century CE, the windmill had been invented in Persia for the first time in history.

Fruits such as the peach first found their way into Europe from Persia, as indicated by their Latin name, persica, from which (by way of the French) we have the English word "peach." As did tulips, which were also first cultivated in ancient Persia and spinach, the word Spinach itself derived from the Persian word اسفناج Esfenaj. The Chinese referred to it in 647CE as 'the herb of Persia'. In 400BCE, a form of ice cream was in use in Persia, and the ancestor of the cookie is said to have come from Persia (from the Persian koolucheh) in the 7th century according to many sources.

Fifth century BCE Persia was even the source for introduction of the domesticated chicken into Europe. The mid fifth century BCE poet Cratinus (according to the later Greek author "Athenaeus") for example calls the chicken "the Persian alarm". In Aristophanes's comedy The Birds (414 BC) a chicken is called "the Median bird", which points to its introduction from Persis.

The Qanat, a subterranean aqueduct used for irrigation in agriculture, was one of the most significant and successful achievements of the Persian tradition. Qanats were in use millennia ago, and are still in use in contemporary Iran.

A boom in the production and export of cotton made Iran the richest region of the Islamic caliphate in the ninth and tenth centuries. Yet in the eleventh century, because of colder temperatures, Iran's impressive agricultural economy entered a steep decline, bringing the country's primacy to an end.

=== Modern era ===
Modern agriculture in Iran dates back to the 1820s, when Amir Kabir, the Chief Minister to Naser al-Din Shah and a symbol of reform and modernism in Iran, undertook a number of changes to the traditional agricultural system. Such changes included importing modified seeds and signing collaboration contracts with other countries. The first agricultural school was founded about a hundred years ago and the Agriculture Bank was established in 1933. The Ministry of Agriculture is currently overseeing and implementing the government's policies in the agricultural sector.

Of the 162.2 million hectares of land in Iran, approximately 19 million hectares is agricultural land. This constitutes 12% of the country's land area. The agricultural sector in Iran currently constitutes 13.9% of GDP and agricultural products form about 30% of Iran's non-oil exports.

The agricultural sector faces a number of challenges in Iran, the two most important being low rainfall and the impact of fluctuations in oil revenues. Unsurprisingly, agricultural production is directly correlated to the amount of rainfall. The relatively dry climate of most of Iran's regions makes water availability a vital factor in production. For instance, a drought in 2007 damaged agricultural output and drove it down to 9.3% of GDP.

Another influential factor is oil revenues. Historically, in periods of high oil prices and the consequent petrodollar windfall, imports accelerate rapidly in virtually all consumption categories including agricultural products. This, in turn, results in crowding out domestic production and damage to the agriculture sector. After the oil price spikes following 1973, agricultural imports also increased dramatically and caused significant damage to domestic production. Between 1970 and 1976, agricultural imports grew at the staggering annual rate of 35%. This experience was repeated in the past couple of years when oil prices were at or over $100 per barrel; the result is that agricultural imports have increased at a rapid pace and foreign products now form a sizeable chunk of the household consumption basket. Over the past few years, there have been significant price increases in agricultural products in Iran. This is due both to rising domestic demand and to rising global commodity prices.

The Iranian government supports the agricultural sector in a number of ways. Like many other countries, the agricultural sector is heavily subsidised by the Iranian government. Each year, the government guarantees the purchase of wheat from the farmers at a pre-specialized price to protect them from seasonality in the market prices. The government also pays a wide range of subsidies for improvements in production methods, the use of fertilisers and pesticides, and agricultural research. Nonetheless, there still exist considerable opportunities to improve efficiency in the agricultural sector. For instance, only 10% of farms are equipped with modern irrigation facilities and the rest are still farmed using legacy methods.

The market mechanism for agricultural products is not particularly developed given the traditional nature of the agricultural sector and the numerous governmental interventions in the market prices. The market mainly consists of a large number of retail traders who purchase the crops from the farmers in small quantities and bring them to the major traders in the bazaar, which is the system that was the predecessor to the modern markets. In order to improve market efficiency and transparency, the Iranian government has allowed trading of agricultural products on the Iran Mercantile Exchange (IME) for the past seven years. Nonetheless, given the direct impact of the prices of agricultural products on people's daily lives and welfare, the government actively intervenes in the market by setting prices, importing products in large amounts, subsidising certain products, and restricting exports in order to supply domestic demand.

With the subsidies reform plan implemented, many experts are hopeful that not only will government intervention and price distortions in agricultural products be reduced, but also that a fundamental restructuring will take place in the agriculture sector. The government has recently quadrupled bread prices as part of the plan. In addition, the pricing of a number of other products that was previously done by the government is now to be left to the market mechanism. More importantly, fuel, water and electricity prices have increased significantly. The government has still kept prices lowest for agriculture in comparison to household and industrial consumers. Nonetheless, the high level of inefficiency in the agricultural sector from irrigation to harvesting, is expected to be fundamentally reformed.

With an diverse climate, high local and regional demand and an educated workforce, Iran's agricultural sector is underdeveloped yet has immense potential for investment and growth. According to a former agriculture minister, deserts in Iran are spreading; South Alborz and East Zagros would become uninhabitable and people will have to migrate. The minister also added that out of 75 million people in Iran, 45 million would have uncertain circumstances.

== Agribusiness ==
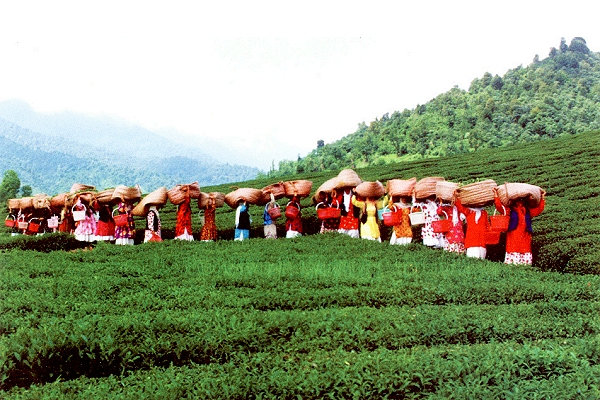
A Lahijan tea farm during harvest time, northern Iran.

After nearly achieving agricultural self-sufficiency in the 1960s, Iran reached the point in 1979 where 65 percent of its food had to be imported. Declining productivity was blamed on the use of modern fertilizers, which had inadvertently scorched the thin Iranian soil. Unresolved land reform issues, a lack of economic incentives to raise surplus crops, and low profit ratios combined to drive increasingly large segments of the farm population into urban areas.

Since 1979 commercial farming has replaced subsistence farming as the dominant mode of agricultural production. The 1979 Revolution sought self-sufficiency in foodstuffs as part of its overall goal of decreased economic dependence on the West. Higher government subsidies for grain and other staples and expanded short-term credit and tax exemptions for farmers complying with government quotas were intended by the new regime to promote self-sufficiency. But by early 1987, Iran was actually more dependent on agricultural imports than in the 1970s.

By 1997, the gross value of products in Iran's agricultural sector had reached $25 billion. In 2000, the Construction Jihad Organization and the Ministry of Agriculture were merged by national legislation, to form the new Ministry of Agricultural Jihad.

The 1999-2000 drought reduced overall GDP by about 4.4%, and resulted in decreased non-oil exports, increased food imports, and a rise in inflation. In 2003, a quarter of Iran's non-oil exports were agricultural based. In 2004 an agricultural bourse started trading agricultural and related products in the country. Iran's agricultural sector contributed 14.1 percent of the GDP in 2004, employing a third of the labor force and constituting over 80% of Iran's food supply.

Benefiting from 123,580 square kilometers of land suitable for agriculture, the agricultural sector is one of the major contributors to Iran's economy. It accounts for almost 13% of Iran's GDP, 20% of the employed population, 23% of non-oil exports, 82% of domestically consumed foodstuffs and 90% of raw materials used in the food processing industry (2008).

=== Focus areas ===
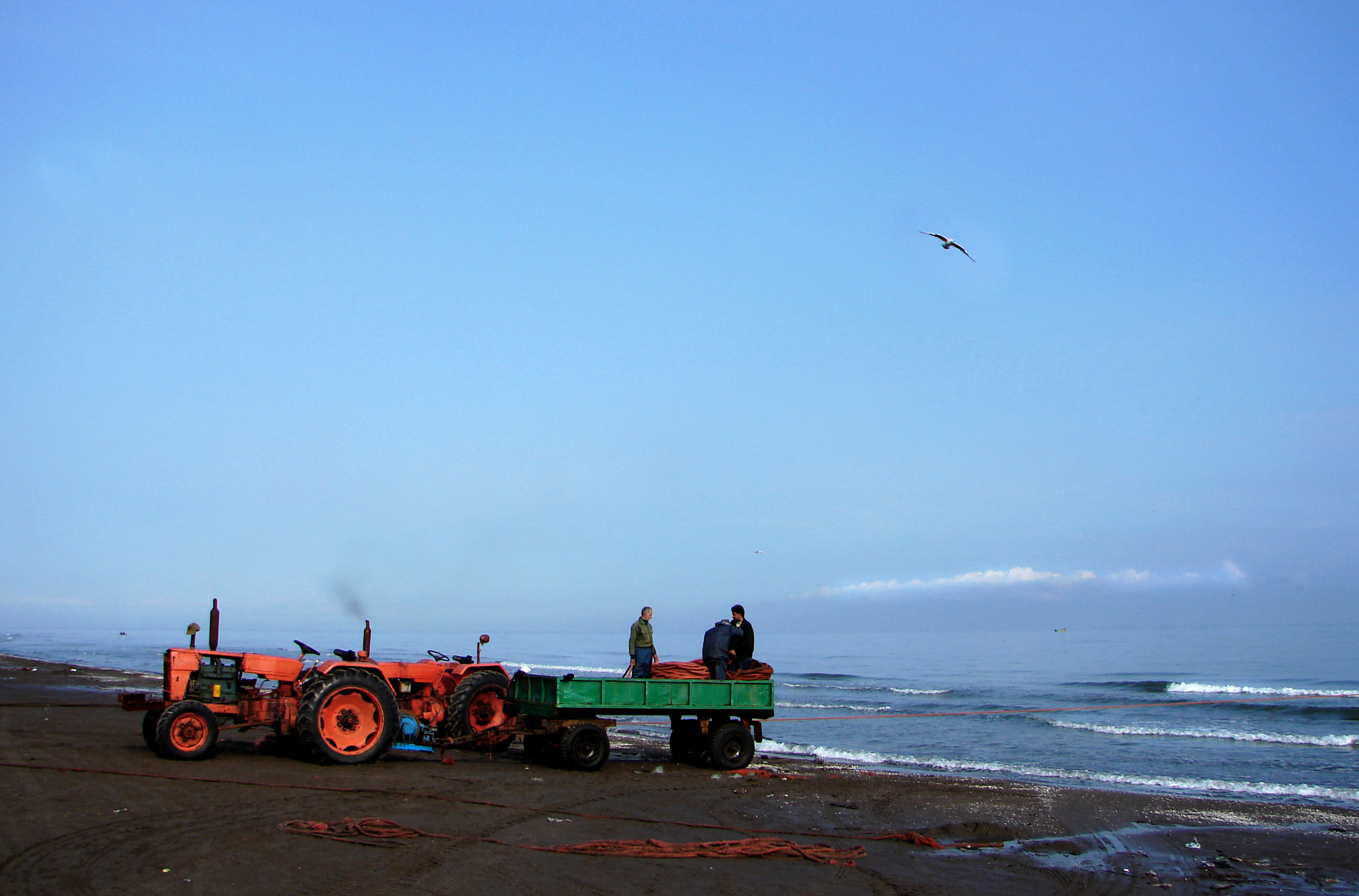
Iranian fishermen by the Mazandaran Sea

The focus areas for agriculture are:

- Financing and low-interest loans for investment in agriculture and agro-industrial projects.
- Ensuring self-sufficiency in the provision of national food requirements.
- Budgets for agro-industrial projects in the food processing, packaging and irrigation sectors.
- Provision of agricultural machinery and equipment with emphasis on local production by making transfer of technology a required clause in foreign contracts. Foreign loans and investments in the agro sector exceeded $500 million in 2008.
- Allocation of government loans and financing for agro-industrial projects.

=== Agro complexes ===
In 2009 seven hundred agricultural complexes were under construction on 60,000 hectares of farmlands across the country. Chicken farms, animal husbandries, fish farming pools and greenhouses are built in these complexes.

=== Mechanized agriculture ===
Mechanized agricultural has had a slow but steady growth in Iran. Industrial facilities in Tabriz and Arak are Iran's largest producers of machinery and equipment for the agricultural sector. 12,000 combine harvesters and 300,000 tractors are currently used in the sector (2007). Tabriz Tractor Manufacturing Company, which was founded four decades ago, employs almost 10,000 people. It produces 30,000 tractors annually, a large part of which is exported. Iran declared self-sufficiency in irrigation and agricultural machinery in 2008. As of 2021, Iran's agricultural mechanization coefficient has reached 1.65 horsepower per hectare.

== Production and consumption ==
There are 22,000 food industries units in the country (2009). The capacity of these units has increased to 60 million tons from 8 million tons in the pre-Islamic Revolution era. Agricultural production stood at 108 million tons in 2008, which indicates a 20 million ton increase from 2007.

Per capita consumption (Source:EIU)	2009 est.	2010 est.
Meat consumption (kg per head)	27	27
Milk consumption (litres per head)	64	65
Fruit consumption (kg per head)	172	173
Vegetable consumption (kg per head)	184	186
Tea consumption (kg per head)	0.9	0.9

=== Production ===
Iranian government policy aims to reach self-sufficiency in food production and by 2007, Iran had attained 96 percent self-sufficiency in essential agricultural products. But wastage in storing, processing, marketing and consumption of food products remained a concern (30% of production according to some sources).

The following is the Iranian out-put listed according to the largest global producer rankings in 2007:

World Ranking	Commodity; (Source: FAO)
1st	Pistachio, Berberis (Zereshk), Caviar, Saffron, Stone fruits, Berries
2nd	Dates, Apricots
3rd	Watermelons, Cherries, Cantaloupes & other melons, Apples, Figs, Gherkins
4th	Sheep Stocks (Flocks), Fresh Fruits, Quinces, Wool, Almonds, Walnuts
5th	Anise, Badian, Fennel, Corian, Chickpeas, Silk worm cocoons
6th	Hazelnut, Buffalo milk, Tomatoes
7th	Grapes, Onions, Sour cherries, Sheep milk, Kiwifruit
8th	Spices, Peach, Nectarines, Tangerine, Mandarin orange, Clementines, Lemons & Limes, Oranges, Goat milk, Pumpkins, Squash & Gourds
9th	Lentils
10th	Persimmons, Tea, Natural honey
11th	Hempseed
12th	Citrus fruits, Wheat, Plum and sloes
13th	Melon-seeds, Hen eggs, Eggplants (Aubergines)
14th	Sugar beet, Fresh vegetables, Barley, Potatoes
15th	Safflower seed, Artichoke

The following items are the most important agricultural commodities in Iran, listed by their international value in United States dollar in 2007:

Commodity; (Source: FAO)	International Value; x$1000	Quantity; Metric Tonnes
Cow milk	1,715,313	6,500,000
Grapes	1,391,700	2,900,000
Tomatoes	1,184,650	5,000,000
Wheat	1,169,603	15,000,000
Apples	764,005	2,660,000
Pistachios	760,184	230,000
Potatoes	729,601	4,500,000
Hen eggs	543,543	711,000
Rice	471,135	2,800,000
Oranges	404,202	2,300,000
Watermelons	344,091	3,300,000
Fresh Vegetables	328,387	1,750,000
Dates	313,470	1,000,000
Onions, Dry	313,293	1,700,000
Cucumbers and gherkins	290,146	1,720,000
Sugar beet	243,959	5,300,000
Fresh Fruit	223,314	1,400,000
Cantaloupes	218,091	1,230,000
Walnuts	208,506	170,000
Cherries	196,317	225,000

==== 2018 ====
- It was the 13th largest world producer of wheat (14.5 million tons);
- It produced 8.1 million tons of sugar cane, which is used to produce sugar and ethanol;
- It was the 6th largest world producer of tomatoes (6.5 million tons);
- It was the 13th largest world producer of potato (5.3 million tons);
- It was the 13th largest world producer of sugar beet (4.9 million tons), which serves to produce sugar and ethanol;
- It was the 2nd largest world producer of watermelon (4.1 million tons), second only to China;
- It was the 16th largest world producer of barley (2.8 million tons);
- It was the 5th largest world producer of apple (2.5 million tons);
- It was the 5th largest world producer of onion (2.4 million tons);
- It was the 2nd largest world producer of cucumber / pickles (2.2 million tons), second only to China;
- It was the 10th largest world producer of grape (2 million tons);
- It was the 10th largest world producer of orange (1.8 million tons);
- It was the 3rd largest world producer of melon (1.7 million tons), second only to China and Turkey;
- It was the 3rd largest world producer of date (1.2 million tons), second only to Egypt and Saudi Arabia;
- It was the 5th largest world producer of eggplant (666 thousand tons);
- It was the 7th largest world producer of peaches (645 thousand tons);
- It was the largest world producer of pistachio (551 thousand tons);
- It was the 3rd largest world producer of walnut (409 thousand tons), second only to China and the USA;
- It was the 3rd largest world producer of apricot (342 thousand tons), second only to Turkey and Uzbekistan;
- It was the 5th largest world producer of plum (313 thousand tons);
- It was the 4th largest world producer of kiwi (266 thousand tons), losing to China, Italy and New Zealand;
- It was the 3rd largest world producer of almonds (139 thousand tons), losing only to USA and Spain;
- It was the 8th largest world producer of tea (109 thousand tons);
- It was the 4th largest world producer of quince (76 thousand tons), losing to Uzbekistan, Turkey and China;
- It produced 2 million tons of rice;
- It produced 1.3 million tons of maize;
- It produced 525 thousand tons of lettuce and chicory;
- Produced 465 thousand tons of tangerine;
- It produced 445 thousand tons of lemon;
- It produced 337 thousand tons of carrot;
- Produced 285 thousand tons of beans;
- It produced 221 thousand tons of chickpeas;
- It produced 210 thousand tons of soy;
- Produced 154 thousand tons of pumpkin;
- Produced 153 thousand tons of pear;
- Produced 137 thousand tons of cherry;

In addition to smaller productions of other agricultural products.

== Exports ==
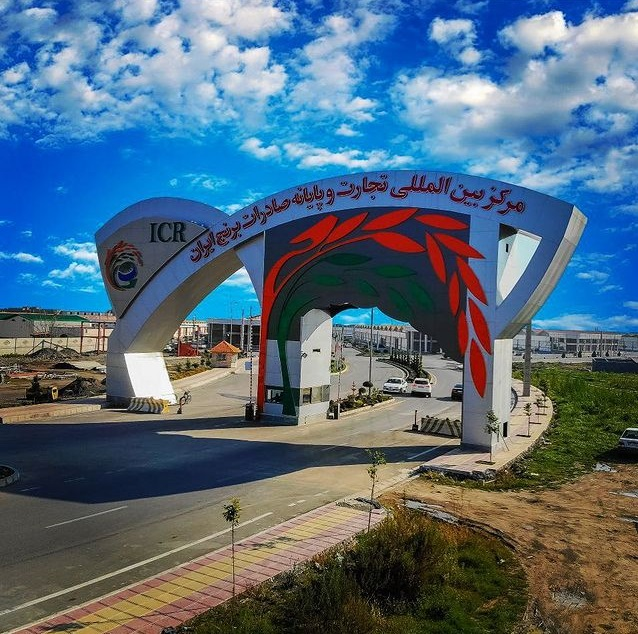
Iran's rice Export and Trading terminal at Amol

Agricultural exports stood at $1.2 billion in 2004-5 and $2.6 billion in 2007–8. Major agricultural exports include fresh and dried fruits, nuts, animal hides, processed foods, caviar and spices. Pistachio, raisins, dates and saffron are the first four export products, from the viewpoint of value. Close to 8 million tons of agricultural products are exported annually (2008). But according to the Central Bank of Iran, only 3.2 million tons of "agricultural products" were exported in 2008 with a total value of $3.2 billion "which showed a 6.1 percent increase over the previous year". Agricultural and food stuff exports in years 2012-13 ending 21 March stood at $5.2 billion.

=== Foodstuff ===
A total of 12,198 entities are engaged in the Iranian food industry, or 12% of all entities in the industry sector. The sector also employs approximately 328,000 people or 16.1% of the entire industry sector's workforce. Iran exported $736 million worth of foodstuffs in 2007 and $1 billion (~600,000 tonnes) in 2010. Soft drinks, mineral water, biscuit, chocolate, confection, edible oil, dairies, conserved foods and fruits, jam and jelly, macaroni, fruit juice and yeast were among the main exports to Iraq, Afghanistan, Turkmenistan, Tajikistan and other Central Asian countries, Russia, Ukraine, Belarus, Pakistan, Saudi Arabia, Kuwait, United Arab Emirates, Qatar, Oman, Syria, Germany, Spain, the Netherlands, France, Canada, Venezuela, Japan, South Korea and Turkey.

== Government policy ==
In theory, Iranian agricultural policy is intended to support farmers and encourage the production of strategically important crops. The policy is twofold: first, to purchase certain crops at guaranteed prices and second, to encourage the production of specific crops through farm subsidies. The policy of purchasing agricultural crops from farmers at guaranteed prices was put in place in the 1989 crop year. On average, the guaranteed prices increased at the rate of inflation over the past 15 years. Individual subsidy levels for major crops, however, vary annually.

In the 1990s and early 2000s, government agricultural planning was only marginally successful. According to government figures, during the 1990s—coincident with the first two Islamic Republic economic plans—only 40.5 percent of the agricultural modernization projected by those plans was accomplished, and only 40.2 percent of government and private-sector financial commitments materialized.

Because wheat is considered Iran's most strategically important crop, it received the largest subsidies, and its production grew at the fastest rate between 1990 and 2005. From FY 2003 to FY 2004, wheat subsidies increased by 17.2 percent, reaching a record of US$1.5 billion. Between 1981 and 2004, the area cultivated with wheat remained stable at 5 million hectares, but wheat production increased from 5.7 million to more than 11 million tons.

Beginning in 1990, the government expanded its agricultural support programs to include a guaranteed purchase price for major agricultural crops, subsidies, favorable interest rates, government investment, and favorable foreign-trade policies. Primarily because of government support for domestic agriculture, between 1989 and 2003 the import volumes of wheat, sugar, and red meat declined by 77.7 percent, 39.6 percent, and 88.2 percent, respectively. Concurrently, the value of agricultural exports increased from US$461.5 million in 1989 to US$1.7 billion in 2004. However, over the same period total food and live animal imports increased from US$1.37 billion to US$2.65 billion.

=== Imports ===
In the past, the Iranian private sector handled the bulk of the country's imports of grain and oilseeds, but since 2012 the government has stepped up operations through its Government Trading Corporation (GTC). Other notable agencies are the Livestock Affairs Logistic Co (SLAL) and the Government Grain Trading Agency.

During Mahmoud Ahmadinejad's presidency between 2005 and 2013 imports of agricultural products increased rapidly and reached $13.214 Billion by year 2012-13 ending 21 March whereas agricultural imports in 2004 stood at $3.5 billion.

As of 2015, Iran is among the world's top four buyers of wheat, barley and rice and one of the 10 largest importers of raw sugar. It has been reported that some imported wheat has been resold into the Iranian government's farmer purchasing scheme at a profit because of lack of import duties for wheat and barley, thus artificially increasing imports at the expense of domestic production.

=== Industry standards ===
Iran is signatory to bi-lateral protocols that set the standards for many of its agricultural imports including meat and wheat. The protocols are usually negotiated on a country-by-country basis and it's commonplace for Iran to inspect produce prior to shipment.

Iran Customs and the Iran Veterinary Organization are the policing bodies for imported food products, including dairy.

Meat imports require written authorization from the Ministries of Commerce and Agricultural Jihad. The Iranian Government insists on the presence of Shiite clergymen and inspections by the Veterinary Organization during any livestock slaughter.

The Codex Commission of Food Stuff, established in 2002 is in charge of setting and developing standards and quality and health regulations.

=== Plant Protection Organization ===
The Plant Protection Organization is in charge of issuing export and import licenses for all kinds of plants and parts thereof including bulbs, cuttings, roots, fruits, saplings, and seeds, as well as the issuance of licenses - which are solely of a technical nature - for importation, exportation, production, transformation and packaging of all kinds of pesticides, herbicides, and plant hormones.

=== Research and development ===
In 2005, Iran's first genetically modified (GM) rice was approved by national authorities and is being grown commercially for human consumption. In addition to GM rice, Iran has produced several GM plants in the laboratory, such as insect-resistant maize; cotton; potatoes and sugar beets; herbicide-resistant canola; salinity- and drought-tolerant wheat; and blight-resistant maize and wheat. Yet, despite the controversy surrounding GM food and government restrictions on the production of biotech products, Iran imports $5 billion of genetically modified crops a year because of laxed laws (2015).

There are different ongoing research in agricultural fields in Iran which are mostly focused on local problems and requirements. Iran has also a very focused and intensive nanotechnology research program for agricultural applications.

== Impacts of climate change ==
The impacts of climate change on agriculture in Iran are already clear to see. Since 2002, the percentage of total GDP that comes from the agricultural sector has declined by over 9%. Currently, wheat is the main crop grown in Iran, as it makes up around 67% of all crop production. While current yields tend to be relatively stable, simulations done on the Mazandaran, Khuzestan, and Eastern Azerbaijan regions show how increasing temperatures and decreased precipitation could reduce output. These three provinces account for roughly 20% of Iran's wheat production, but all have starkly different geological and climatic features. The simulations showed that the warmer Mazandaran and Khuzestan regions were particularly susceptible to climate change, with decreasing yields of 7-45% and 7-54% respectively. The colder Eastern Azerbaijan province was the only one to potentially increase yields due to impending climate change (0-16%).

Another concern regarding agriculture in Iran is the efficiency of water usage. The impacts of decreased water availability could be crucial for this sector, which currently accounts for roughly 90% of water usage. This has already proved to be a problem historically, when droughts in the late 90s caused major agricultural losses amounting to over $10 billion. With studies predicting a potential 35% decrease in annual precipitation, the supply of water available for agriculture could shrink significantly. This is especially problematic because of the lack of water productivity in the agricultural sector, which currently is around 33%.

== See also ==
- Cuisine of Iran
- Habibollah Hedayat
- International rankings of Iran
- Iran Combine Manufacturing Company
- Iranian Agriculture News Agency
- Irrigation in Iran
- List of reservoirs and dams in Iran
- Water supply and sanitation in Iran
