= Ministry of Agriculture Jihad =

Government ministry of Iran

Coordinates: 35°42′34.87″N 51°23′51.52″E

- وزارت جهاد کشاورزی; Vezārat-e Jehād-e Kešâvarzi
- Flag of the Ministry of Agriculture Jihad

Agency overview
- Formed: 2001
- Jurisdiction: Government of the Islamic Republic of Iran
- Employees: 86,578 (2019)
- Agency executive: Gholamreza Nouri Ghezeljeh
- Website: www.maj.ir

The Ministry of Agriculture Jihad (Persian: وزارت جهاد کشاورزی Vezārat-e Jehād-e Kešâvarzi) is an Iranian government body established in 2001 responsible for the oversight of Agriculture in Iran. The ministry has been called Jihad of Construction but it was merged with agriculture ministry in 2001 to form the Ministry of Agricultural Jihad.

== Agricultural Research, Education and Extension Organization ==
Agricultural Research, Education and Extension Organization (AREEO) was established by the Act of National Consultative Assembly on June 30, 1974. The main mandate of the Agricultural Research, Education and Extension Organization is to develop and manage all research activities of agriculture and natural resources in the Ministry of Agriculture Jihad. Agricultural Research, Education and Extension Organization is determined to facilitate an effective collaboration between Iranian and International Research Institutes on agriculture and well recognized research programs in the field. Some institutes under the umbrella of Agricultural Research, Education and Extension Organization had been established several years before establishment of Agricultural Research, Education and Extension Organization, such as: Iranian Fisheries Science Research Institute in 1918, Iranian Research Institute of Plant Protection in 1923, Razi Vaccine and Serum Research Institute in 1925, and Seed and Plant Improvement Institute in 1930. Currently, Agricultural Research, Education and Extension Organization with 19 nationwide research institutes/ The mandates of research Institutes of Agricultural Research, Education and Extension Organization of Islamic Republic of Iran are categorized in three main areas, including agricultural and horticultural plants, animal research and finally, Natural Resources and Agricultural Engineering Research. According to these main areas of research, the research institutes of Agricultural Research, Education and Extension Organization of Islamic Republic of Iran can be clustered as:

- Agricultural and Horticultural Plants Research Institutes
  - Horticultural Sciences Research Institute (HSRI)
  - Iranian Research Institute of Plant Protection (IRIPP)
  - Seed and Plant Improvement Institute (SPII)
  - Dryland Agricultural Research Institute (DARI)
  - Sugar Beet Seed Institute (SBSI)
  - Rice Research Institute of Iran (RRII)
  - Cotton Research Institute of Iran (CRII)
  - Agricultural Biotechnology Research Institute of Iran (ABRII)
  - Seed and Plant Certification and Registration Institute (SPCRI)
- Animal Research Institutes
  - Iranian Fisheries Science Research Institute (IFSRI)
  - Razi Vaccine and Serum Research Institute (RVSRI)
  - Animal Science Research Institute of Iran (ASRII)
  - Iran Silk Research Center (ISRC)
  - International Sturgeon Research Institute (ISRI)
- Natural Resources and Agricultural Engineering Research Institutes
  - Research Institute of Forests and Rangelands (RIFR)
  - Soil Conservation and Watershed Management Research Institute (SCWMRI)
  - Soil and Water Research Institute (SWRI)
  - Agricultural Engineering Research Institute (AERI)
  - National Salinity Research Center (NSRC)
  - National Center for Genetic Resources (NCGR)

== See also ==
- Agriculture in Iran
- Agricultural Research, Education and Extension Organization
- Iranian Agriculture News Agency
- Water supply and sanitation in Iran
- Iran Combine Manufacturing Company
