= Fruit production in Iran =

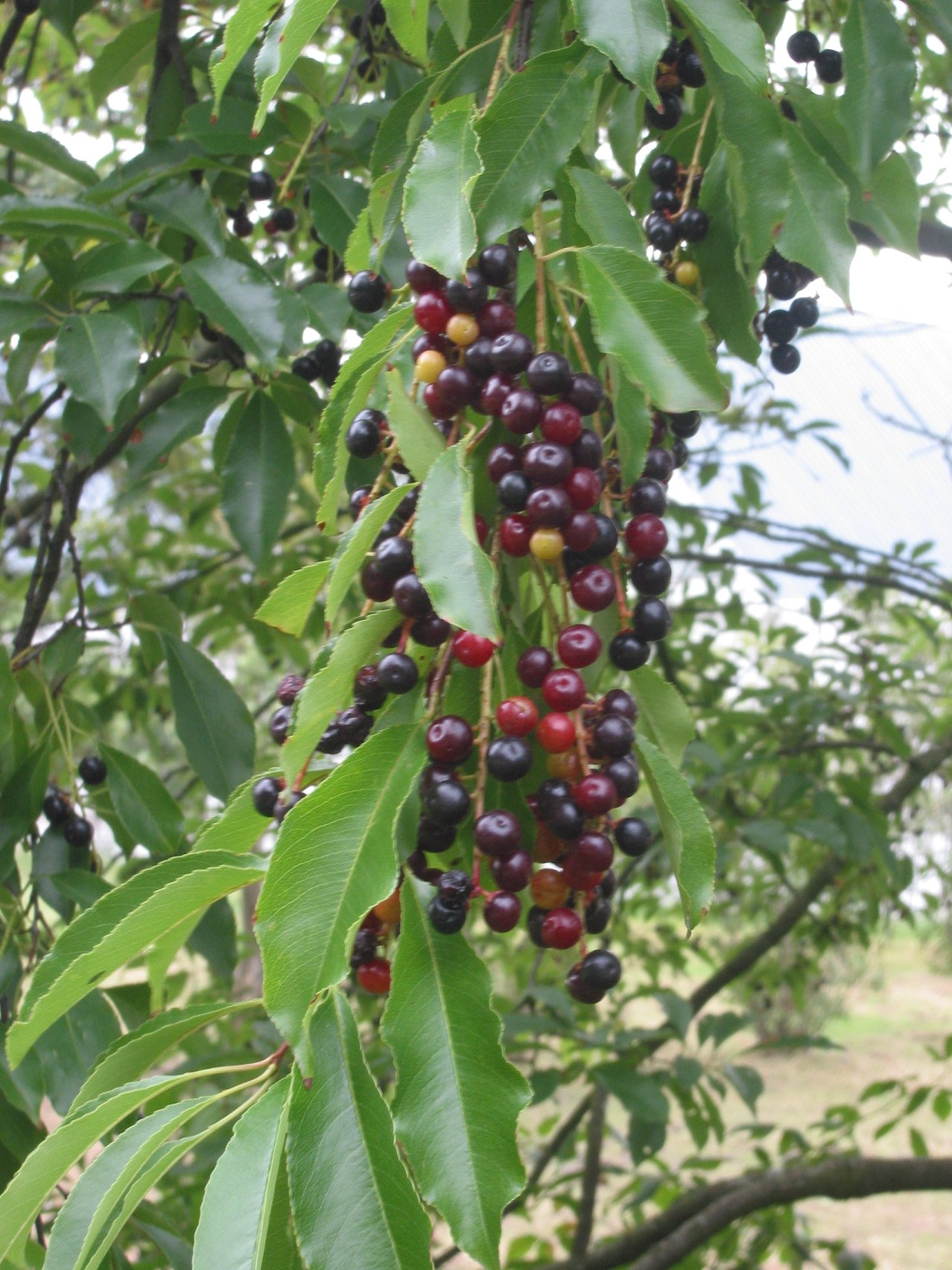
Immature black cherries

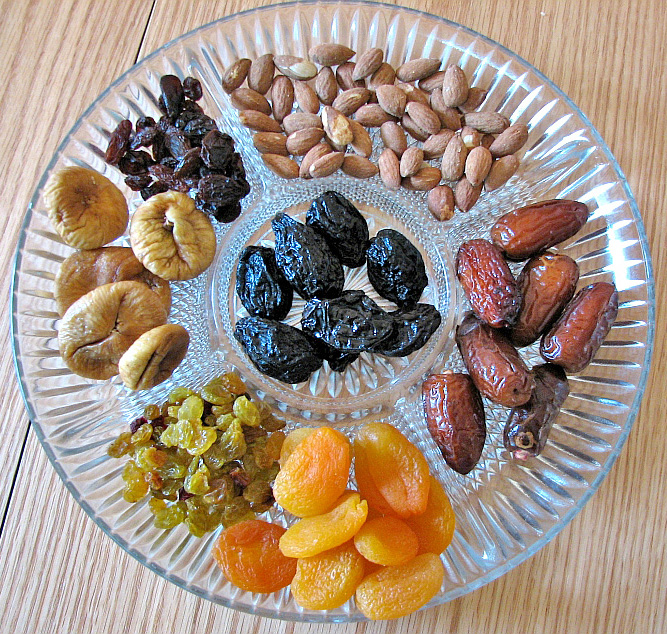
dried fruit

Iran ranks 1st in fruit production in the Middle East and North Africa. Iran has been ranked between 8th and 10th in global fruit production in different years. Iran produces Persian walnut, melon, tangerine, citrus fruits, Kiwifruit, dates, cherries, pomegranates, peach, oranges, raisins, saffron, grapes, Apricot, Pitted Prune and watermelon.

== History and culture ==
A number of globally cultivated fruits may have originated in prehistoric Iran, including pomegranates (locally known today as anâr), dates (khormâ) (from the Persian Gulf coastal region), Persian walnuts (gerdu or formerly/dialectally gowz), and possibly grapes (angur) (from the northwest), though in each case the precise place of original cultivation is difficult to know with certainty. Additionally, many fruit cultivars used in Iranian cuisine have a local origin, including zalzalak (zâlzâlak), which is a variety of azarole (Crataegus azarolus var. aronia), unripe almonds (chaghale badum), black mulberries (tut), green plums (goje sabz, literally “green tomato”), yellow plums (âlu zard), other damson plums (âluče, literally “little plum”), black pomegranates, sour cherries (âlbâlu, used in the dish albaloo polo), and medlar (azgil or in the Gorgan dialect kondos). Iran has produced other distinct cultivars of globally important fruits, such as Persian limes, Persian melons, and various apple cultivars, that have become successful on the international market.

== Growing areas and agroclimatology ==
The country benefits from a variety of favorable meteorological conditions suitable for fruit production. The northern seaside lands of the Caspian Sea, and the country supplies finest conditions for citrus production. Iran ranks 1st in the world in the production of pomegranates, 2nd in dates, 3rd in figs, 3rd in cherries, 7th in grapes, and 7th in oranges. Kiwifruit production, although a relatively new activity in this part of the world, has grown increasing importance in last few years and the Iranian kiwifruit promises to become a great export item of the agricultural sector of the country.

== Production and ranking ==
Iran ranks 1st in fruit production in the Middle East and North Africa. 2.7 million hectares of orchards are being harvested in Iran with an annual production this year of 16.5 million tons. Per capita production of fruit in the globe is 80 kilograms while in Iran it is 200 kg according to official FAO statistics.

Iran grows fifty different kinds of fruit. The record for pomegranate production is 100 tons in a hectare of land, 146 ton for apples and 70 tons for oranges. In 2010 Iran exported $2 billion worth of fruit to neighboring countries and the European Union, 46 percent more than the previous year. In the second half of 2010 the import of agricultural goods in Iran increased 30 percent in weight and 14 percent in value which shows the country's good progress in the field of agricultural goods production. Since 1963 Iran is one of the leading producers and exporters of dried fruit and nuts such as all kinds of pistachios, Sultana raisins, golden raisins, sun-dried raisins, Malayer raisins, Kashmar raisins, almonds, all kinds of Iranian dates and with its modern facilities is ready to provide its customers with all these products.

== Export List ==
Iran has a rich variety of fruits that are suitable for drying, such as figs, apricots, plums, raisins, berries, apples, pears, peaches, cherries, bananas, kiwis, and more. Iran also has a favorable climate and soil for growing high-quality fruits.

== See also ==
- Agriculture in Iran
