= List of countries by artichoke production =

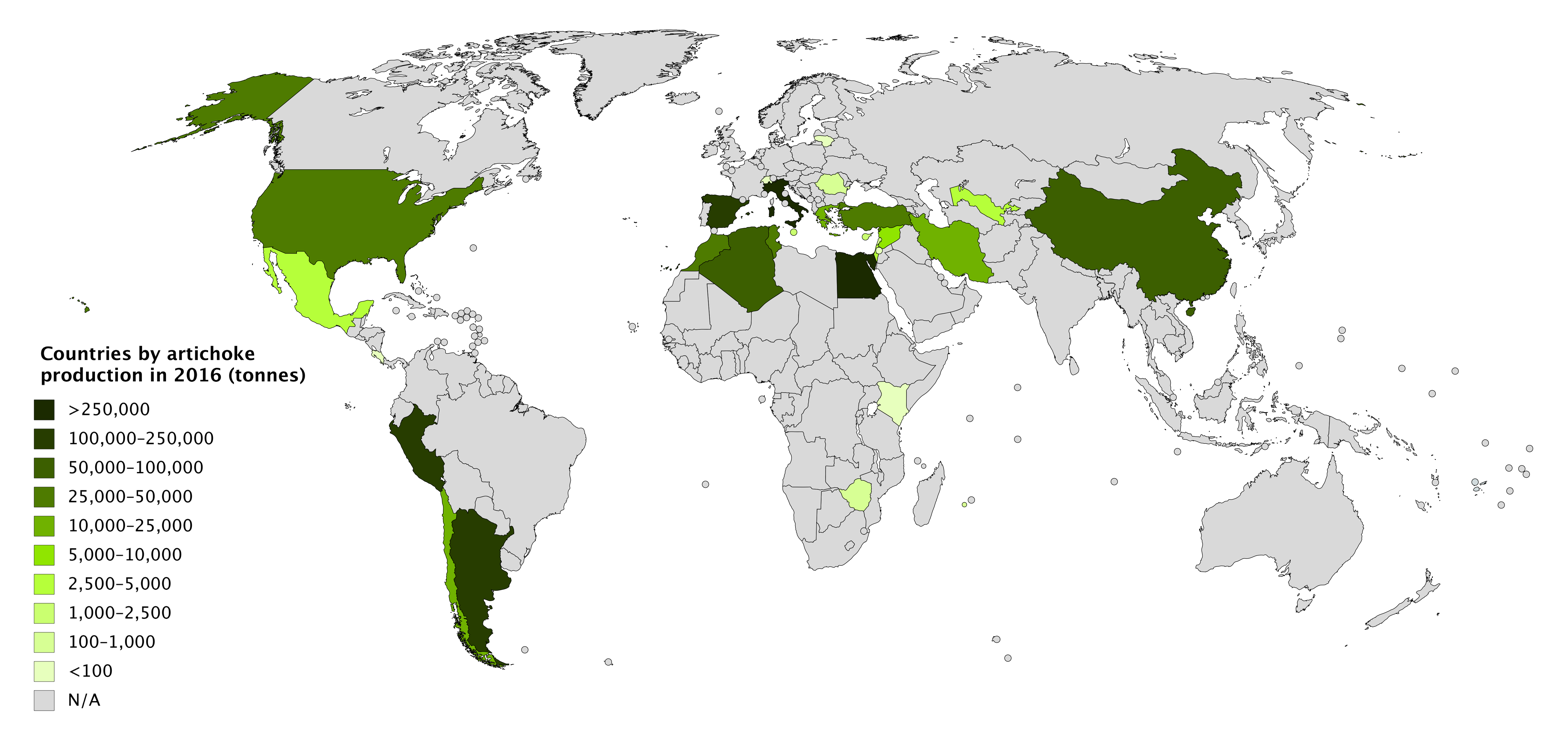
Countries by artichoke production in 2016

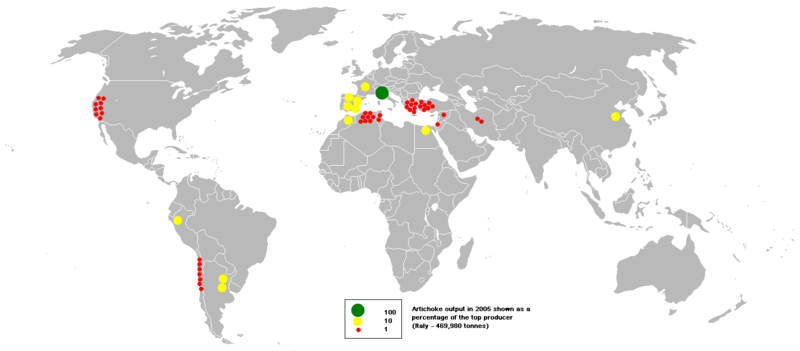
A map of artichoke production, 2005

This is a list of countries by artichoke production in 2022, based on data from the Food and Agriculture Organization Corporate Statistical Database. The estimated total world artichoke production was 1,584,514 metric tonnes.

== Production by country ==
Country/region	Artichoke production (tonnes)
Egypt	459,962
Italy	378,110
Spain	200,070
Algeria	124,305
Peru	97,131
China	81,023
Morocco	41,025
Turkey	40,815
United States	33,679
Argentina	30,417
Tunisia	24,000
France	21,750
Iran	17,915
Chile	10,614
Greece	7,280
Uzbekistan	3,862
Mexico	3,409
Syria	2,900
Israel	2,115
Malta	1,230
Cyprus	1,010
Romania	679
Kazakhstan	628
Lebanon	473
Poland	400
Zimbabwe	304
Hungary	30
Costa Rica	28
Kenya	27
Switzerland	2
