= List of countries by apricot production =

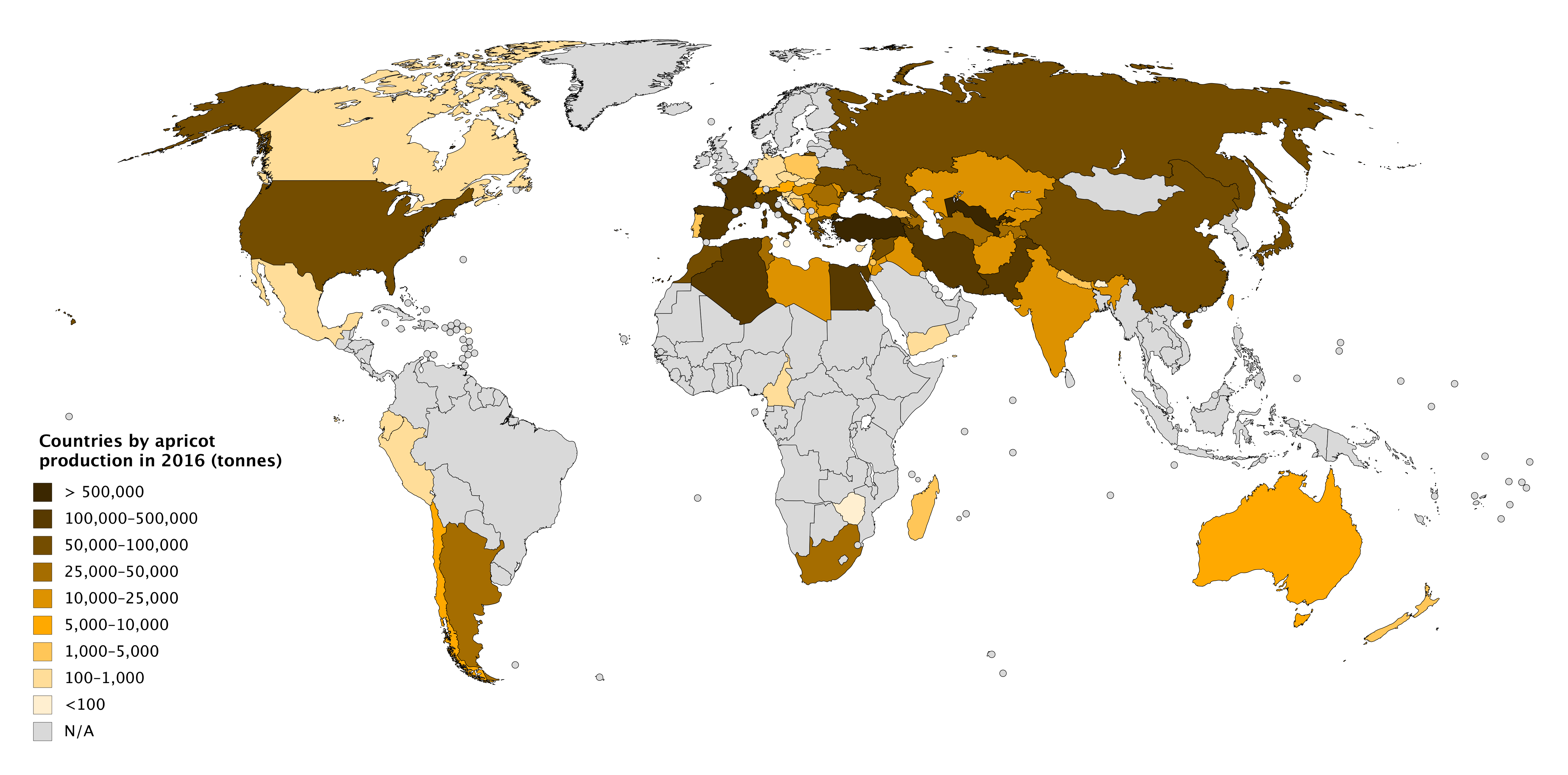
Countries by apricot production in 2016

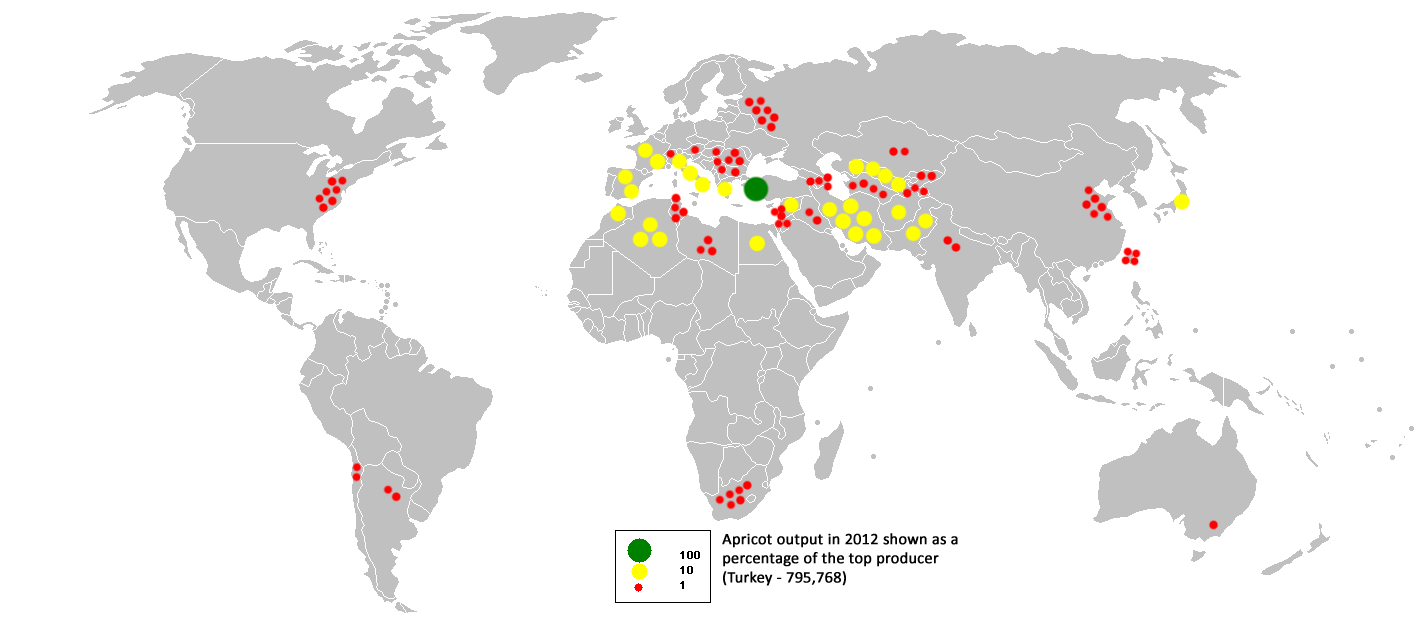
A map of world apricot production, 2012

This is a list of countries by apricot production in 2022 and 2021, based on data from the Food and Agriculture Organization Corporate Statistical Database. The estimated total world production for apricots in 2022 was 3,863,180 metric tonnes, up 6.6% from 3,622,553 tonnes in 2021.

== Production by country ==
=== >100,000 tonnes ===
Rank	Country/region	2022	2021
–	World	3,863,180	3,622,553
1	Turkey	803,000	800,000
2	Uzbekistan	451,263	424,734
3	Iran	305,932	257,360
4	Italy	230,080	189,570
5	Algeria	203,916	189,724
6	Pakistan	174,546	159,022
7	Afghanistan	170,508	207,490
8	France	128,080	54,590
9	Armenia	113,572	86,889
10	Greece	112,230	76,540

=== 50,000–100,000 tonnes ===
Rank	Country/region	2022	2021
11	Japan	96,600	104,600
12	Russia	84,900	79,000
13	Spain	80,870	114,720
14	Egypt	71,979	66,207
15	Morocco	68,001	78,449
16	Syria	57,779	33,635
17	China	53,325	53,533

=== 10,000–50,000 tonnes ===
Rank	Country/region	2022	2021
18	Ukraine	49,710	56,840
19	Serbia	44,386	31,362
20	Tunisia	37,000	38,000
21	Turkmenistan	34,972	34,817
22	Lebanon	32,639	36,610
23	Iraq	31,151	34,153
24	Tajikistan	31,036	31,196
25	Azerbaijan	30,284	29,366
26	South Africa	29,276	39,520
27	Libya	28,189	24,424
28	Argentina	27,517	27,412
29	United States	26,890	36,260
30	Kyrgyzstan	26,067	25,985
31	Kazakhstan	24,208	23,901
32	Hungary	24,110	11,770
33	Romania	23,500	26,840
34	Bulgaria	19,040	20,700
35	Jordan	18,793	19,225
36	Taiwan	16,155	17,850
37	India	14,874	14,983
38	Moldova	11,800	8,700

=== 1,000–10,000 tonnes ===
Rank	Country/region	2022	2021
39	Switzerland	9,445	3,347
40	Israel	6,500	4,500
41	Austria	6,280	5,690
42	Albania	5,500	5,057
43	North Macedonia	5,312	2,584
44	Australia	5,267	6,154
45	Poland	4,600	3,100
46	Chile	4,562	4,580
47	Bosnia and Herzegovina	4,117	660
48	Portugal	4,010	3,450
49	Georgia	2,600	2,000
50	Nepal	2,226	2,009
51	New Zealand	1,946	2,717
52	Yemen	1,722	1,726
53	Czechia	1,530	1,860
54	Madagascar	1,485	1,478
55	Mexico	1,083	1,089
56	Cyprus	1,000	1,040

=== <1,000 tonnes ===
Rank	Country/region	2022	2020
57	Cameroon	924	925
58	Slovenia	910	60
59	Palestine	857	318
60	Canada	782	801
61	Croatia	670	120
62	Peru	669	469
63	Slovakia	460	310
64	Ecuador	359	359
65	Germany	214 (2017)	219 (2016)
66	Kenya	76	76
67	Zimbabwe	45	45
68	Bhutan	35	41
69	Malta	30	10
70	Guadeloupe	25 (2017)	25 (2016)
