= List of countries by barley production =

Barley production

This is a list of countries by barley production in 2022 based on the Food and Agriculture Organization Corporate Statistical Database. Total world barley production for 2016 was 141,277,993 metric tonnes. In 2022, production was 154,877,140 metric tonnes.

== Production by country ==
=== >1,000,000 tonnes ===
Rank	Country/region	Barley production (tonnes)
1	Russia	23,393,510
2	Australia	14,377,284
3	France	11,285,440
4	Germany	11,207,100
5	Canada	9,986,681
6	Turkey	8,500,000
7	United Kingdom	7,385,000
8	Spain	7,029,720
9	Ukraine	5,608,170
10	Argentina	5,279,608
11	Denmark	4,122,600
12	United States	3,795,650
13	Kazakhstan	3,287,240
14	Iran	3,000,000
15	Poland	2,782,010
16	Ethiopia	2,400,000
17	China	1,960,000
18	Czech Republic	1,877,360
19	Romania	1,706,650
20	Algeria	1,600,000
21	Hungary	1,590,740
22	Ireland	1,549,860
23	Sweden	1,509,500
24	Finland	1,467,600
25	India	1,371,360
26	Italy	1,158,410
27	Belarus	1,100,000
28	Azerbaijan	1,069,446

=== 100,000–1,000,000 tonnes ===
Rank	Country/region	Barley production (tonnes)
29	Mexico	969,913
30	Uruguay	897,200
31	Austria	767,120
32	Morocco	696,380
33	Bulgaria	624,600
34	Norway	591,000
35	Slovakia	556,480
36	Kyrgyzstan	539,602
37	Lithuania	522,000
38	Brazil	521,996
39	Tunisia	521,000
40	Estonia	488,820
41	Serbia	452,001
42	Belgium	373,000
43	New Zealand	329,728
44	Greece	323,380
45	Croatia	321,900
46	South Africa	308,675
47	Netherlands	283,230
48	Latvia	281,600
49	Japan	233,300
50	Peru	225,496
51	Switzerland	184,553
52	Syria	178,542
53	Thailand	174,346
54	Tajikistan	150,000
55	Iraq	144,493
56	North Macedonia	137,691
57	Moldova	132,700
58	Uzbekistan	123,447
59	Slovenia	112,460
60	Afghanistan	110,000
61	Chile	109,018

=== 10,000–100,000 tonnes ===
Rank	Country/region	Barley production (tonnes)
62	Egypt	96,717
63	Bosnia and Herzegovina	89,610
64	Armenia	75,429
65	Libya	70,000
66	South Korea	67,983
67	Eritrea	65,000
68	Georgia	58,800
69	Zimbabwe	57,292
70	Bolivia	47,159
71	North Korea	39,534
72	Pakistan	38,037
73	Luxembourg	37,520
74	Jordan	35,000
75	Nepal	32,156
76	Lebanon	30,000
77	Portugal	27,780
78	Cyprus	26,700
79	Turkmenistan	25,000
80	Yemen	24,000
81	Tanzania	20,249
82	Kenya	20,000
83	Albania	19,014
84	Zambia	14,201
85	Israel	13,750
86	Palestine	11,454
87	Ecuador	11,155

=== 1,000–10,000 tonnes ===
Rank	Country/region	Barley production (tonnes)
88	Iceland	8,900
89	Colombia	6,955
90	Kuwait	4,948
91	Saudi Arabia	4,300
92	Mongolia	4,126
93	Oman	3,155
94	Mauritania	1,455

=== <1,000 tonnes ===
Rank	Country/region	Barley production (tonnes)
95	Democratic Republic of the Congo	992
96	Montenegro	973
97	Bhutan	615
98	Lesotho	305
99	Bangladesh	172
100	Qatar	78
101	Guatemala	18
