= List of countries by plum production =

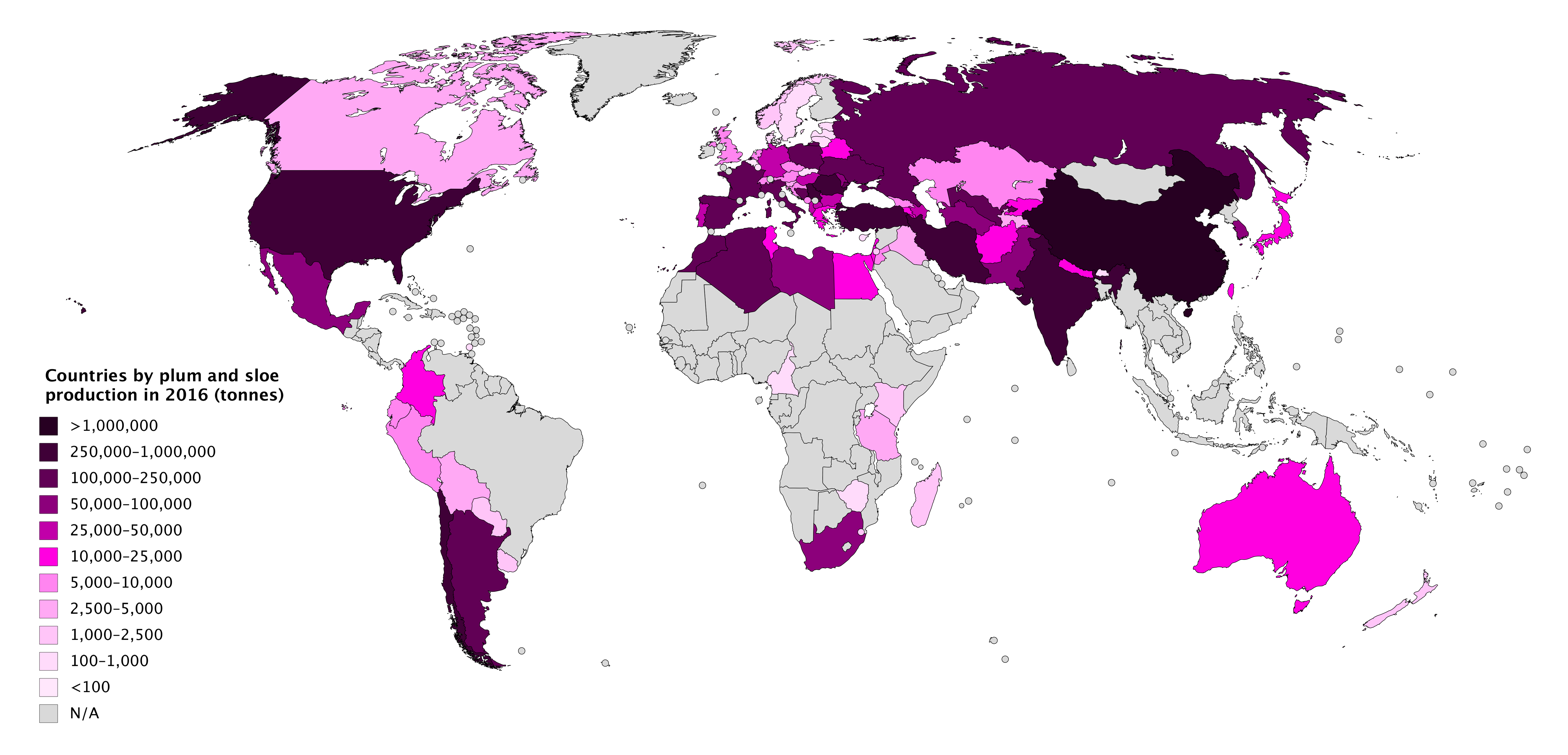
Countries by plum and sloe production in 2016

This is a list of countries by plum and sloe production from 2017–2022, based on data from the Food and Agriculture Organization Corporate Statistical Database. The estimated total world production of plum and sloe in 2022 was 12,391,467 metric tonnes, up 1% from 12,209,265 tonnes in 2021. China was by far the largest producer, accounting for just over 54% of global production.

== Production by country ==
=== >100,000 tonnes ===
| Rank | Country/region | 2022 | 2021 | 2020 | 2019 | 2018 | 2017 |
|---|---|---|---|---|---|---|---|
| 1 | China | 6,752,221 | 6,777,011 | 6,761,754 | 6,717,899 | 6,851,378 | 6,715,985 |
| — | European Union | 1,472,320 | 1,571,810 | 1,639,710 | 1,625,030 | 1,763,740 | 1,290,877 |
| 2 | Romania | 665,730 | 807,170 | 757,880 | 692,670 | 830,060 | 444,922 |
| 3 | Serbia | 488,593 | 412,778 | 582,547 | 558,930 | 430,199 | 330,582 |
| 4 | Chile | 424,887 | 420,766 | 414,129 | 445,000 | 359,000 | 357,600 |
| 5 | Turkey | 348,750 | 332,533 | 329,056 | 317,946 | 296,878 | 291,934 |
| 6 | Iran | 332,231 | 324,447 | 341,291 | 359,176 | 305,617 | 355,416 |
| 7 | Bosnia and Herzegovina | 306,880 | 131,574 | 159,197 | 114,415 | 190,386 | 74,398 |
| 8 | United States | 279,500 | 303,270 | 245,380 | 327,950 | 345,000 | 402,250 |
| 9 | Russia | 212,300 | 197,600 | 182,000 | 174,000 | 165,800 | 133,200 |
| 10 | Italy | 187,350 | 137,770 | 156,290 | 215,020 | 197,730 | 206,966 |
| 11 | Morocco | 178,865 | 178,761 | 143,457 | 151,488 | 205,222 | 179,387 |
| 12 | Uzbekistan | 177,602 | 143,351 | 130,092 | 133,078 | 134,869 | 115,966 |
| 13 | Ukraine | 168,610 | 188,300 | 173,230 | 181,140 | 198,070 | 200,470 |
| 14 | Spain | 157,370 | 179,320 | 153,590 | 179,840 | 152,980 | 172,325 |
| 15 | Poland | 133,200 | 117,400 | 117,400 | 94,950 | 121,080 | 38,403 |
| 16 | South Africa | 111,227 | 101,969 | 65,373 | 62,557 | 74,254 | 77,408 |
| 17 | Argentina | 101,874 | 60,684 | 64,825 | 52,517 | 176,000 | 39,110 |
| 18 | Moldova | 100,200 | 136,100 | 103,173 | 131,947 | 132,754 | 93,182 |

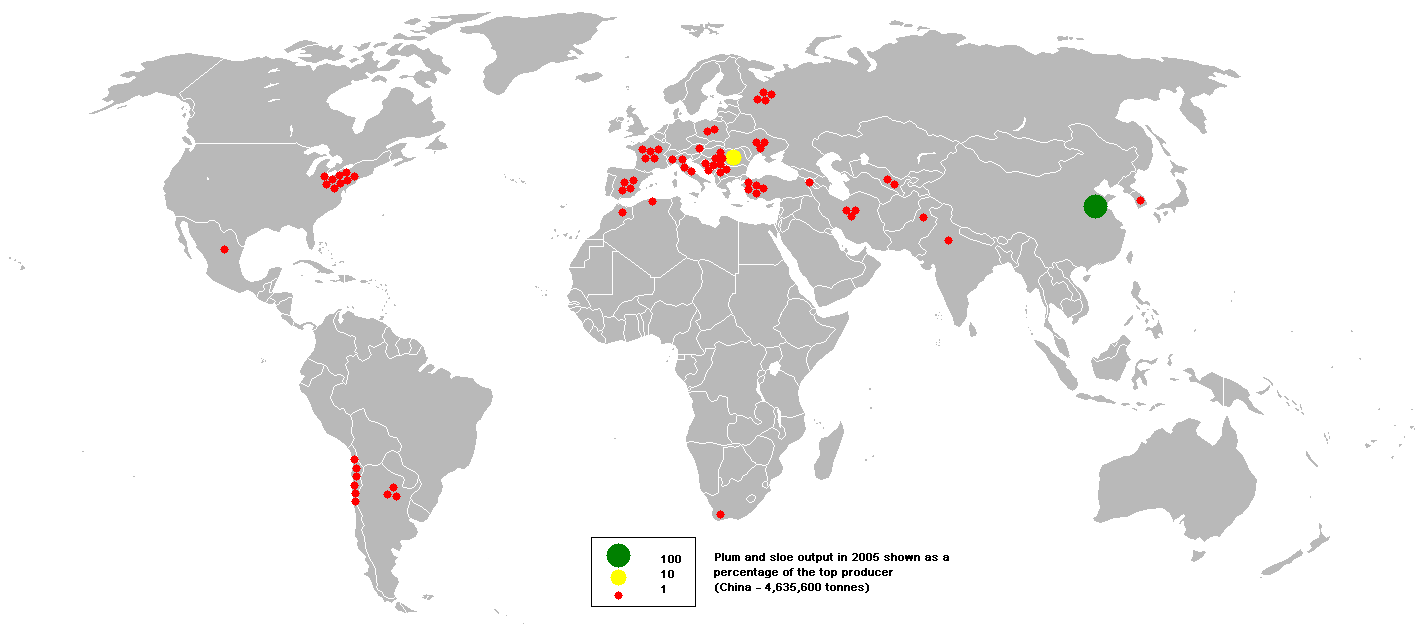
A map of world plum and sloe production, 2005

=== 10,000–100,000 tonnes ===
| Rank | Country/region | 2022 | 2021 | 2020 | 2019 | 2018 | 2017 |
|---|---|---|---|---|---|---|---|
| 19 | France | 99,990 | 106,280 | 225,900 | 205,110 | 175,440 | 211,142 |
| 20 | Algeria | 99,048 | 97,056 | 98,908 | 113,085 | 111,471 | 111,797 |
| 21 | Mexico | 88,163 | 84,182 | 90,438 | 72,902 | 84,447 | 83,607 |
| 22 | Pakistan | 59,676 | 60,280 | 52,075 | 51,276 | 47,701 | 46,423 |
| 23 | Bulgaria | 56,650 | 65,120 | 60,020 | 56,190 | 56,430 | 49,194 |
| 24 | Libya | 54,924 | 54,997 | 54,796 | 54,978 | 55,218 | 54,191 |
| 25 | South Korea | 52,616 | 50,257 | 50,028 | 51,087 | 53,794 | 62,778 |
| 26 | Germany | 51,370 | 44,460 | 51,320 | 52,140 | 70,120 | 23,885 |
| 27 | Afghanistan | 45,890 | 57,336 | 29,872 | 38,321 | 35,971 | 31,844 |
| 28 | Albania | 45,141 | 41,186 | 41,708 | 40,928 | 41,241 | 42,437 |
| 29 | Azerbaijan | 41,140 | 39,149 | 37,174 | 36,951 | 36,415 | 33,559 |
| 30 | North Macedonia | 39,512 | 27,031 | 34,983 | 32,303 | 37,719 | 17,880 |
| 31 | Lebanon | 38,150 | 39,190 | 38,367 | 36,894 | 35,566 | 37,612 |
| 32 | Hungary | 34,970 | 33,250 | 27,040 | 45,250 | 46,690 | 43,295 |
| 33 | Armenia | 34,204 | 25,000 | 24,961 | 23,229 | 21,164 | 24,016 |
| 34 | Turkmenistan | 33,873 | 33,837 | 33,801 | 33,796 | 33,760 | 33,550 |
| 35 | Greece | 24,380 | 21,410 | 21,200 | 20,540 | 28,790 | 19,183 |
| 36 | Egypt | 23,703 | 46,653 | 17,280 | 16,450 | 14,429 | 14,883 |
| 37 | Syria | 23,082 | 21,539 | 25,888 | 26,808 | 31,289 | 31,294 |
| 38 | Tunisia | 20,000 | 18,500 | 20,000 | 19,000 | 14,000 | 13,600 |
| 39 | Israel | 19,000 | 17,000 | 20,970 | 25,000 | 22,700 | 24,500 |
| 40 | Japan | 18,800 | 18,800 | 16,500 | 18,100 | 23,100 | 19,600 |
| 41 | Colombia | 18,734 | 18,460 | 16,420 | 16,904 | 16,565 | 18,092 |
| 42 | Australia | 18,310 | 18,445 | 18,612 | 18,640 | 18,548 | 18,701 |
| 43 | Portugal | 17,770 | 22,350 | 19,180 | 20,800 | 17,480 | 29,784 |
| 44 | Yemen | 17,214 | 14,825 | 12,236 | 10,023 | 8,126 | – |
| 45 | Georgia | 16,400 | 10,100 | 11,300 | 4,200 | 9,500 | 3,800 |
| 46 | Iraq | 13,138 | 14,994 | 16,584 | 15,351 | 4,464 | 3,579 |
| 47 | Kyrgyzstan | 12,351 | 12,309 | 12,329 | 12,414 | 12,185 | 12,389 |
| 48 | Belarus | 12,185 | 15,373 | 15,632 | 12,759 | 27,681 | 3,293 |
| 49 | Czech Republic | 10,680 | 6,980 | 8,820 | 8,760 | 12,920 | 4,065 |
| 50 | Croatia | 10,640 | 5,200 | 11,450 | 9,060 | 12,540 | 8,209 |
| 51 | Austria | 10,500 | 13,850 | 17,860 | 12,780 | 29,560 | 9,721 |
| 52 | Nepal | 10,445 | 10,134 | 11,737 | 10,375 | 9,887 | 9,119 |

=== 1,000–10,000 tonnes ===
| Rank | Country/region | 2022 | 2021 | 2020 | 2019 | 2018 | 2017 |
|---|---|---|---|---|---|---|---|
| 53 | Taiwan | 8,968 | 10,848 | 10,481 | 8,090 | 13,080 | 12,787 |
| 54 | Kazakhstan | 8,893 | 10,398 | 10,185 | 9,667 | 8,312 | 6,701 |
| 55 | Ecuador | 8,751 | 8,733 | 8,715 | 8,830 | 8,810 | 8,775 |
| 56 | Netherlands | 6,400 | 6,510 | 6,800 | 6,870 | 6,500 | 5,570 |
| 57 | Switzerland | 6,338 | 3,021 | 9,446 | 7,198 | 14,263 | 3,985 |
| 58 | Peru | 6,078 | 7,798 | 6,861 | 7,841 | 8,483 | 7,413 |
| 59 | Jordan | 4,333 | 4,023 | 3,683 | 4,150 | 3,366 | 3,070 |
| 60 | Bolivia | 4,209 | 4,022 | 4,094 | 4,530 | 4,189 | 4,208 |
| 61 | Tajikistan | 4,143 | 3,983 | 3,539 | 3,500 | 3,500 | 3,500 |
| 62 | United Kingdom | 4,099 | 3,600 | 8,319 | 7,371 | 8,680 | 8,000 |
| 63 | Tanzania | 4,041 | 4,054 | 4,052 | 4,019 | 4,091 | 4,046 |
| 64 | Canada | 3,788 | 3,665 | 2,993 | 4,096 | 3,643 | 4,364 |
| 65 | Madagascar | 2,356 | 2,349 | 2,368 | 2,351 | 2,328 | 2,298 |
| 66 | Uruguay | 2,162 | 2,440 | 2,292 | 2,560 | 2,324 | 2,055 |
| 67 | Norway | 2,014 | 2,533 | 724 | 2,568 | 1,948 | 1,859 |
| 68 | Paraguay | 1,981 | 1,968 | 1,956 | 1,943 | 1,952 | 1,929 |
| 69 | Cyprus | 1,550 | 1,700 | 1,600 | 1,210 | 1,190 | 1,632 |
| 70 | Eswatini | 1,446 | 1,446 | 1,445 | 1,408 | 1,461 | 1,487 |
| 71 | New Zealand | 1,340 | 1,818 | 1,829 | 1,602 | 1,611 | 1,405 |
| 72 | Slovakia | 1,260 | 1,540 | 1,260 | 1,790 | 2,190 | 993 |
| 73 | Montenegro | 1,116 | 1,229 | 842 | 722 | 1,379 | 1,045 |
| 74 | Kenya | 1,029 | 1,074 | 448 | 557 | 807 | 1,046 |

=== <1,000 tonnes ===
| Rank | Country/region | 2022 | 2021 | 2020 | 2019 | 2018 | 2017 |
|---|---|---|---|---|---|---|---|
| 75 | Lithuania | 830 | 440 | 530 | 470 | 380 | 409 |
| 76 | Grenada | 757 | 755 | 753 | 751 | 745 | 743 |
| 77 | Cameroon | 619 | 623 | 620 | 614 | 635 | 611 |
| 78 | Palestine | 522 | 626 | 1,120 | 1,431 | 1,838 | 2,300 |
| 79 | Slovenia | 450 | 150 | 620 | 420 | 580 | 208 |
| 80 | Denmark | 330 | 320 | 290 | 450 | 390 | 359 |
| 81 | Bhutan | 312 | 257 | 439 | 585 | 532 | 482 |
| 82 | Sweden | 290 | 270 | 190 | 250 | 250 | 250 |
| 83 | Zimbabwe | 266 | 267 | 267 | 265 | 269 | 266 |
| 84 | Belgium | 200 | 70 | 150 | 130 | 100 | 17 |
| 85 | Luxembourg | 180 | 110 | 190 | 170 | 170 | 23 |
| 86 | Malawi | 149 | 149 | 150 | 150 | 150 | 152 |
| 87 | Latvia | 110 | 100 | 100 | 60 | 100 | 58 |
| 88 | Estonia | 60 | 30 | 20 | 60 | 30 | 266 |
| 89 | Malta | 60 | 10 | 10 | 40 | 40 | – |
