= List of countries by tomato production =

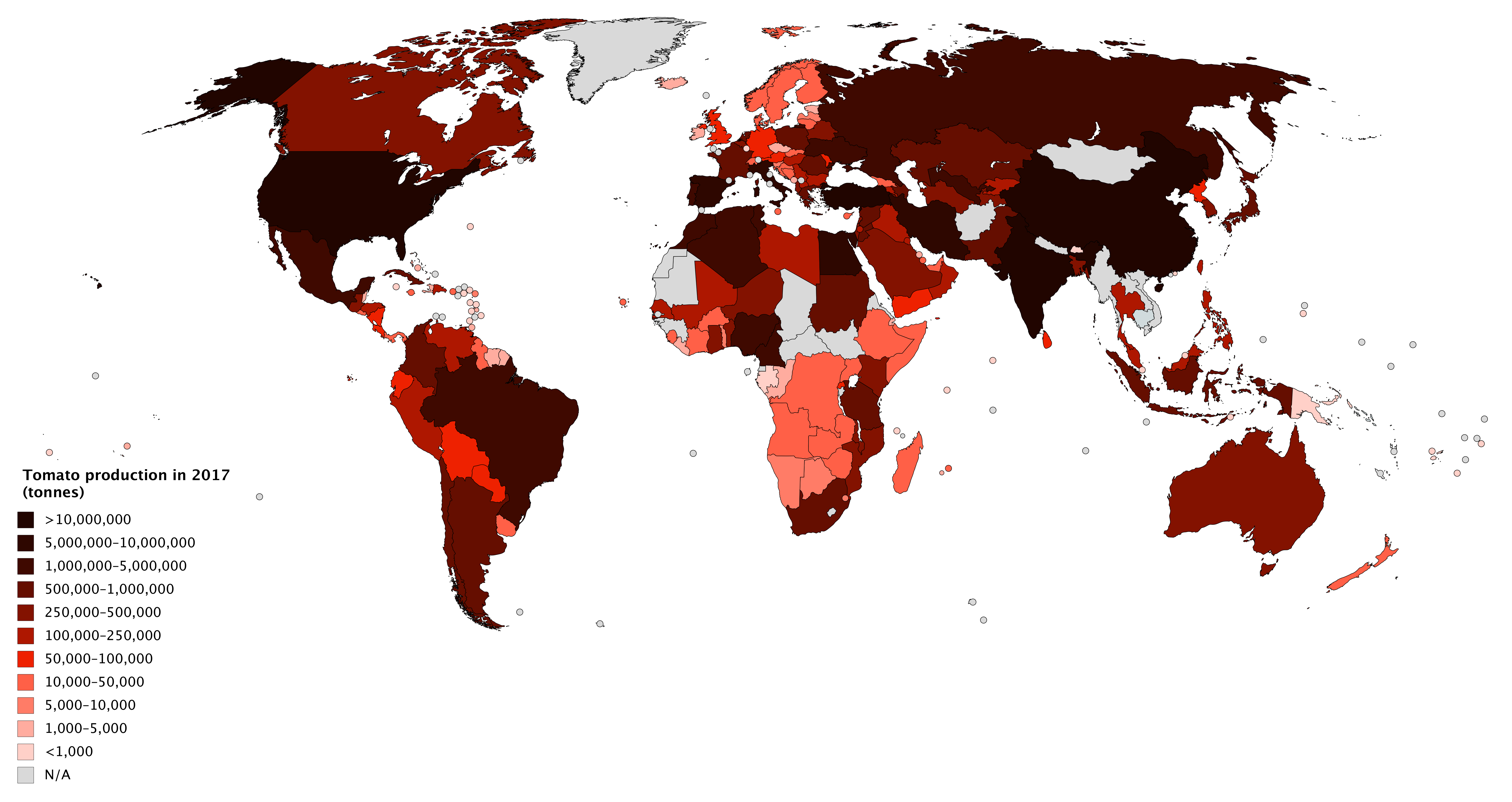
Countries by tomato production in 2017

This is a list of countries by tomato production from 2016 to 2022, based on data from the Food and Agriculture Organization Corporate Statistical Database. The estimated total world production for tomatoes in 2022 was 186,107,972 metric tonnes, a decrease of 1.7% from 189,281,485 tonnes in 2021. China was by far the largest producer, accounting for nearly 37% of global production. Dependent territories are shown in italics.

== Production by country ==
=== >1,000,000 tonnes ===
| Rank | Country | 2022 | 2021 | 2020 | 2019 | 2018 | 2017 | 2016 |
|---|---|---|---|---|---|---|---|---|
| 1 | China | 68,241,811 | 66,505,512 | 64,679,453 | 62,869,502 | 60,919,328 | 59,108,957 | 57,313,103 |
| 2 | India | 20,694,000 | 21,181,000 | 20,550,000 | 19,007,000 | 19,759,000 | 20,708,000 | 18,732,000 |
| 3 | Turkey | 13,000,000 | 13,095,258 | 13,204,015 | 12,841,990 | 12,150,000 | 12,750,000 | 12,600,000 |
| 4 | United States | 10,199,753 | 10,434,442 | 10,939,109 | 10,858,982 | 12,613,090 | 11,138,620 | 12,877,049 |
| 5 | Egypt | 6,275,444 | 6,389,295 | 6,493,950 | 6,814,460 | 6,777,754 | 6,729,004 | 7,320,714 |
| 6 | Italy | 6,136,380 | 6,644,790 | 6,247,910 | 5,777,610 | 5,798,100 | 6,015,868 | 6,437,572 |
| 7 | Mexico | 4,207,889 | 4,149,241 | 4,137,342 | 4,271,914 | 4,559,375 | 4,243,058 | 4,047,171 |
| 8 | Brazil | 3,809,986 | 3,679,256 | 3,757,078 | 3,920,997 | 4,126,988 | 4,225,414 | 4,166,789 |
| 9 | Nigeria | 3,684,566 | 3,477,981 | 3,390,170 | 3,499,022 | 3,500,000 | 2,809,200 | 2,632,500 |
| 10 | Spain | 3,651,940 | 4,754,380 | 4,312,900 | 5,000,560 | 4,768,600 | 5,163,466 | 5,233,542 |
| 11 | Iran | 3,400,000 | 3,392,153 | 3,615,887 | 4,348,826 | 4,930,169 | 4,894,956 | 5,828,557 |
| 12 | Russia | 2,645,662 | 3,051,227 | 2,975,588 | 3,014,989 | 2,899,664 | 2,668,993 | 2,335,772 |
| 13 | Uzbekistan | 2,191,153 | 2,206,641 | 1,928,508 | 2,120,120 | 2,284,217 | 2,455,125 | 2,796,189 |
| 14 | Algeria | 1,661,664 | 1,641,636 | 1,635,616 | 1,477,878 | 1,309,745 | 1,286,286 | 1,280,570 |
| 15 | Mozambique | 1,599,051 | 1,431,657 | 1,207,282 | 992,420 | 762,346 | 550,100 | 374,000 |
| 16 | Portugal | 1,406,280 | 1,741,320 | 1,399,210 | 1,530,110 | 1,329,760 | 1,747,634 | 1,693,860 |
| 17 | Argentina | 1,393,000 | 1,362,000 | 1,221,000 | 1,162,000 | 1,103,043 | 1,028,880 | 998,555 |
| 18 | Morocco | 1,388,542 | 1,311,101 | 1,398,831 | 1,347,085 | 1,409,437 | 1,293,761 | 1,231,248 |
| 19 | Ukraine | 1,257,470 | 2,444,880 | 2,250,300 | 2,224,440 | 2,324,070 | 2,267,460 | 2,229,690 |
| 20 | Cameroon | 1,219,046 | 1,139,418 | 1,104,600 | 1,101,754 | 1,160,830 | 1,009,757 | 1,091,490 |
| 21 | Indonesia | 1,168,744 | 1,114,399 | 1,084,993 | 1,020,331 | 976,772 | 962,856 | 883,242 |
| 22 | Tunisia | 1,160,000 | 1,460,000 | 1,423,000 | 1,534,000 | 1,187,000 | 1,219,000 | 1,329,000 |

=== 100,000–1,000,000 tonnes ===
| Rank | Country | 2022 | 2021 | 2020 | 2019 | 2018 | 2017 | 2016 |
|---|---|---|---|---|---|---|---|---|
| 23 | Colombia | 875,437 | 851,177 | 823,300 | 556,692 | 596,279 | 473,772 | 690,515 |
| 24 | Azerbaijan | 826,493 | 807,347 | 774,877 | 697,817 | 609,179 | 624,198 | 502,769 |
| 25 | Kazakhstan | 801,293 | 818,052 | 788,760 | 790,501 | 765,453 | 739,007 | 705,550 |
| 26 | Pakistan | 792,938 | 802,151 | 594,210 | 561,293 | 550,979 | 572,837 | 587,111 |
| 27 | Poland | 787,200 | 815,800 | 766,600 | 917,800 | 928,830 | 898,012 | 866,980 |
| 28 | Netherlands | 770,000 | 880,000 | 910,000 | 910,000 | 910,000 | 910,000 | 900,000 |
| 29 | Greece | 752,510 | 888,320 | 908,250 | 808,670 | 835,940 | 785,264 | 897,691 |
| 30 | Malawi | 732,159 | 697,493 | 653,375 | 624,613 | 583,177 | 533,606 | 483,740 |
| 31 | Jordan | 715,722 | 711,420 | 577,288 | 496,216 | 717,865 | 690,447 | 837,344 |
| 32 | France | 711,040 | 726,170 | 703,590 | 709,280 | 712,020 | 810,969 | 821,103 |
| 33 | Japan | 707,900 | 725,200 | 706,000 | 720,600 | 724,200 | 737,200 | 743,200 |
| 34 | Chile | 686,627 | 936,431 | 800,331 | 1,065,455 | 1,102,409 | 993,076 | 910,310 |
| 35 | Saudi Arabia | 658,540 | 620,866 | 598,774 | 259,949 | 312,343 | 306,389 | 305,203 |
| 36 | Kenya | 658,000 | 702,205 | 1,046,181 | 567,941 | 599,458 | 507,142 | 410,033 |
| 37 | Syria | 650,056 | 757,132 | 780,617 | 771,649 | 1,079,235 | 1,174,134 | 866,425 |
| 38 | Sudan | 632,600 | 636,614 | 632,581 | 628,785 | 648,474 | 620,482 | 617,400 |
| 39 | Iraq | 630,160 | 744,166 | 754,759 | 619,543 | 467,579 | 123,611 | 286,596 |
| 40 | Angola | 587,785 | 561,666 | 589,664 | 560,618 | 538,871 | 618,215 | 545,571 |
| 41 | Canada | 528,938 | 515,013 | 492,072 | 490,286 | 497,438 | 492,394 | 501,375 |
| 42 | Tajikistan | 496,806 | 480,219 | 527,866 | 491,024 | 443,811 | 409,398 | 361,531 |
| 43 | South Africa | 464,563 | 530,843 | 599,306 | 584,452 | 537,257 | 672,176 | 629,974 |
| 44 | Tanzania | 464,171 | 465,307 | 464,993 | 462,213 | 468,715 | 464,053 | 453,870 |
| 45 | Bangladesh | 442,299 | 474,815 | 415,494 | 387,653 | 385,038 | 383,725 | 368,121 |
| 46 | Guatemala | 400,115 | 407,825 | 421,251 | 407,825 | 329,280 | 325,234 | 314,598 |
| 47 | South Korea | 393,133 | 369,383 | 344,048 | 358,580 | 388,657 | 355,107 | 390,303 |
| 48 | Ghana | 382,247 | 383,721 | 379,799 | 383,220 | 373,166 | 370,158 | 366,772 |
| 49 | Niger | 360,442 | 338,771 | 324,728 | 310,946 | 289,806 | 263,394 | 269,079 |
| 50 | Turkmenistan | 354,922 | 356,816 | 354,002 | 353,947 | 343,608 | 340,000 | 340,000 |
| 51 | Belarus | 330,974 | 300,979 | 289,803 | 298,996 | 284,672 | 279,522 | 282,625 |
| 52 | Australia | 325,000 | 336,888 | 297,474 | 329,188 | 386,376 | 371,578 | 405,167 |
| 53 | Albania | 315,057 | 314,470 | 313,109 | 299,669 | 288,626 | 286,811 | 284,552 |
| 54 | Burkina Faso | 313,578 | 291,567 | 281,000 | 281,000 | 280,000 | 244,000 | 322,000 |
| 55 | Cuba | 305,615 | 317,232 | 290,448 | 480,300 | 553,906 | 584,072 | 481,470 |
| 56 | Oman | 302,029 | 283,274 | 340,228 | 201,293 | 199,232 | 191,597 | 89,086 |
| 57 | Romania | 298,920 | 500,200 | 493,720 | 436,550 | 464,040 | 679,807 | 627,177 |
| 58 | Belgium | 298,800 | 282,670 | 311,500 | 270,140 | 258,680 | 255,960 | 259,535 |
| 59 | Israel | 289,693 | 364,300 | 343,366 | 299,082 | 345,109 | 373,289 | 385,550 |
| 60 | Lebanon | 272,490 | 273,185 | 270,720 | 272,490 | 248,740 | 226,771 | 249,877 |
| 61 | Benin | 266,750 | 266,685 | 261,103 | 360,250 | 253,150 | 324,506 | 335,412 |
| 62 | Kyrgyzstan | 247,474 | 231,053 | 237,156 | 240,734 | 224,737 | 228,952 | 234,718 |
| 63 | Mali | 238,447 | 219,038 | 233,705 | 159,977 | 204,698 | 175,577 | 201,694 |
| 64 | Libya | 224,646 | 221,270 | 218,210 | 218,360 | 217,100 | 217,446 | 216,367 |
| 65 | Philippines | 216,609 | 225,451 | 222,002 | 223,294 | 220,825 | 218,793 | 210,720 |
| 66 | Peru | 211,339 | 243,791 | 204,052 | 201,838 | 252,794 | 220,618 | 232,898 |
| 67 | Malaysia | 194,305 | 186,621 | 192,129 | 176,544 | 199,422 | 188,185 | 242,946 |
| 68 | Palestine | 186,847 | 223,139 | 306,510 | 128,890 | 218,890 | 175,329 | 172,730 |
| 69 | Armenia | 186,080 | 206,086 | 183,657 | 158,784 | 138,124 | 234,228 | 298,140 |
| 70 | Venezuela | 182,735 | 182,774 | 184,979 | 187,373 | 182,918 | 196,124 | 170,422 |
| 71 | Yemen | 172,831 | 162,634 | 126,454 | 117,075 | 103,593 | 97,453 | 96,768 |
| 72 | North Macedonia | 151,187 | 154,164 | 155,131 | 152,348 | 161,621 | 159,721 | 161,951 |
| 73 | Senegal | 151,000 | 155,050 | 135,410 | 148,000 | 138,000 | 102,000 | 102,000 |
| 74 | Serbia | 148,131 | 135,108 | 103,277 | 111,639 | 131,869 | 170,764 | 160,456 |
| 75 | Hungary | 137,860 | 171,770 | 154,140 | 188,600 | 211,860 | 184,573 | 173,095 |
| 76 | Thailand | 137,325 | 134,084 | 126,864 | 127,935 | 123,609 | 122,593 | 118,650 |
| 77 | Bulgaria | 126,460 | 116,420 | 115,790 | 145,010 | 148,080 | 158,762 | 141,367 |
| 78 | Kuwait | 106,677 | 82,945 | 66,901 | 132,222 | 97,991 | 104,046 | 81,330 |
| 79 | Germany | 102,180 | 101,770 | 102,120 | 106,690 | 103,270 | 96,561 | 85,287 |

=== 10,000–100,000 tonnes ===
| Rank | Country | 2022 | 2021 | 2020 | 2019 | 2018 | 2017 | 2016 |
|---|---|---|---|---|---|---|---|---|
| 80 | Taiwan | 99,944 | 98,340 | 97,603 | 104,794 | 108,082 | 111,125 | 118,958 |
| 81 | Sri Lanka | 88,081 | 89,669 | 90,507 | 77,916 | 101,404 | 80,839 | 92,748 |
| 82 | Bolivia | 86,837 | 77,116 | 73,515 | 70,319 | 64,715 | 63,549 | 61,531 |
| 83 | Rwanda | 81,023 | 93,587 | 90,509 | 105,758 | 107,703 | 97,426 | 118,774 |
| 84 | Honduras | 74,765 | 78,000 | 79,420 | 81,000 | 80,000 | 80,235 | 78,483 |
| 85 | Nicaragua | 74,227 | 87,196 | 86,290 | 82,637 | 80,723 | 71,577 | 74,269 |
| 86 | United Kingdom | 71,921 | 68,319 | 65,222 | 60,861 | 66,8983 | 85,508 | 96,556 |
| 87 | United Arab Emirates | 70,639 | 78,187 | 80,086 | 60,081 | 78,607 | 80,236 | 43,791 |
| 88 | North Korea | 66,383 | 66,330 | 66,277 | 66,352 | 66,358 | 66,288 | 66,163 |
| 89 | Paraguay | 64,045 | 57,775 | 53,986 | 52,984 | 50,000 | 55,700 | 51,095 |
| 90 | Costa Rica | 58,698 | 58,979 | 48,905 | 45,564 | 55,307 | 57,238 | 57,238 |
| 91 | Austria | 56,980 | 59,770 | 58,670 | 58,330 | 58,150 | 54,258 | 55,068 |
| 92 | Ecuador | 52,229 | 55,277 | 38,438 | 31,591 | 31,891 | 62,675 | 55,550 |
| 93 | Democratic Republic of the Congo | 50,778 | 50,573 | 50,367 | 50,208 | 49,950 | 49,688 | 49,401 |
| 94 | Dominican Republic | 47,115 | 26,508 | 27,980 | 261,604 | 242,935 | 195,410 | 249,832 |
| 95 | Moldova | 47,100 | 25,300 | 23,342 | 37,891 | 52,120 | 61,927 | 54,641 |
| 96 | Qatar | 44,924 | 39,502 | 31,817 | 28,309 | 26,133 | 14,563 | 12,694 |
| 97 | Ivory Coast | 44,579 | 46,628 | 47,283 | 45,400 | 44,078 | 39,500 | 38,200 |
| 98 | Georgia | 44,500 | 56,800 | 69,500 | 62,600 | 51,700 | 49,900 | 54,100 |
| 99 | New Zealand | 41,878 | 41,187 | 41,295 | 56,051 | 56,435 | 48,109 | 69,948 |
| 100 | Madagascar | 40,953 | 40,812 | 40,671 | 40,765 | 39,942 | 39,496 | 39,584 |
| 101 | Uganda | 37,637 | 37,654 | 37,779 | 37,479 | 37,706 | 38,152 | 36,578 |
| 102 | Switzerland | 36,702 | 35,068 | 38,832 | 38,199 | 43,996 | 42,533 | 41,907 |
| 103 | Uruguay | 36,028 | 36,051 | 36,038 | 35,996 | 36,118 | 36,000 | 35,870 |
| 104 | Ethiopia | 35,345 | 33,656 | 41,948 | 34,947 | 23,584 | 27,775 | 28,365 |
| 105 | Finland | 34,070 | 37,590 | 41,250 | 40,450 | 39,320 | 39,386 | 40,621 |
| 106 | Bosnia and Herzegovina | 33,743 | 52,892 | 49,635 | 43,700 | 43,918 | 46,166 | 57,070 |
| 107 | Jamaica | 29,722 | 29,524 | 25,495 | 28,270 | 30,450 | 27,545 | 31,427 |
| 108 | Zimbabwe | 26,387 | 26,562 | 26,269 | 26,328 | 25,343 | 25,278 | 25,318 |
| 109 | Guyana | 26,256 | 24,313 | 27,346 | 33,599 | 38,563 | 28,479 | 19,092 |
| 110 | Zambia | 25,926 | 25,896 | 25,865 | 25,910 | 25,921 | 25,939 | 25,882 |
| 111 | Croatia | 25,840 | 18,790 | 33,370 | 22,020 | 22,640 | 41,223 | 30,707 |
| 112 | Panama | 25,325 | 26,905 | 25,076 | 20,904 | 19,680 | 19,681 | 18,074 |
| 113 | Somalia | 23,778 | 23,727 | 23,851 | 23,757 | 23,572 | 24,223 | 23,478 |
| 114 | El Salvador | 21,854 | 23,017 | 23,359 | 21,861 | 19,915 | 22,018 | 18,114 |
| 115 | Sierra Leone | 20,188 | 20,116 | 20,217 | 20,231 | 19,900 | 20,519 | 20,273 |
| 116 | Lithuania | 19,550 | 13,950 | 11,630 | 11,710 | 12,190 | 11,974 | 11,565 |
| 117 | Puerto Rico | 19,306 | 19,195 | 19,089 | 19,240 | 19,187 | 18,936 | 18,696 |
| 118 | Sweden | 17,290 | 17,460 | 19,050 | 16,900 | 18,230 | 14,450 | 14,620 |
| 119 | Slovakia | 17,070 | 23,240 | 14,220 | 22,850 | 22,290 | 21,964 | 18,922 |
| 120 | Cyprus | 15,500 | 15,260 | 12,680 | 16,140 | 15,540 | 15,206 | 13,364 |
| 121 | Mauritius | 14,269 | 13,832 | 8,352 | 8,684 | 9,190 | 10,651 | 10,136 |
| 122 | Norway | 13,562 | 13,321 | 14,239 | 12,761 | 12,801 | 10,574 | 11,141 |
| 123 | Czech Republic | 13,460 | 12,870 | 8,730 | 10,620 | 10,080 | 4,891 | 14,350 |
| 124 | Denmark | 11,390 | 11,390 | 11,760 | 11,760 | 11,760 | 11,759 | 10,575 |
| 125 | Comoros | 11,300 | 11,027 | 10,729 | 10,431 | 10,133 | 9,835 | 9,537 |
| 126 | Slovenia | 10,360 | 8,770 | 10,240 | 9,010 | 8,390 | 8,396 | 8,652 |
| 127 | Cape Verde | 10,082 | 11,200 | 12,474 | 14,329 | 14,702 | 16,817 | 15,133 |

=== 1,000–10,000 tonnes ===
| Rank | Country | 2022 | 2021 | 2020 | 2019 | 2018 | 2017 | 2016 |
|---|---|---|---|---|---|---|---|---|
| 128 | Botswana | 8,999 | 9,072 | 8,493 | 8,765 | 6,390 | 7,791 | 6,000 |
| 129 | Namibia | 8,666 | 8,690 | 8,663 | 8,647 | 8,760 | 8,581 | 8,601 |
| 130 | Bahrain | 8,004 | 7,800 | 6,951 | 6,800 | 6,500 | 6,480 | 5,605 |
| 131 | Bahamas | 7,578 | 7,513 | 7,642 | 7,580 | 7,316 | 8,031 | 7,393 |
| 132 | Malta | 7,310 | 8,420 | 10,520 | 9,840 | 11,190 | 10,902 | 12,380 |
| 133 | Eswatini | 5,576 | 5,508 | 5,472 | 5,748 | 5,303 | 5,365 | 5,417 |
| 134 | Togo | 5,148 | 5,191 | 5,237 | 5,285 | 5,316 | 5,365 | 5,370 |
| 135 | Latvia | 4,810 | 5,300 | 4,500 | 4,750 | 5,200 | 5,068 | 5,821 |
| 136 | Republic of the Congo | 3,820 | 3,829 | 3,845 | 3,864 | 3,839 | 3,797 | 3,804 |
| 137 | Ireland | 3,690 | 3,770 | 3,710 | 3,730 | 3,920 | 3,780 | 4,000 |
| 138 | Liberia | 3,566 | 3,556 | 3,510 | 3,633 | 3,525 | 3,374 | 4,000 |
| 139 | Trinidad and Tobago | 3,343 | 2,190 | 2,624 | 1,700 | 1,756 | 2,689 | 2,280 |
| 140 | Fiji | 2,367 | 1,633 | 1,238 | 495 | 448 | 374 | 356 |
| 141 | Haiti | 2,359 | 2,351 | 2,361 | 2,363 | 2,330 | 2,391 | 2,368 |
| 142 | Montenegro | 2,287 | 2,856 | 2,823 | 2,875 | 4,866 | 4,768 | 4,464 |
| 143 | Mongolia | 2,196 | 1,985 | 2,308 | 1,918 | | | |
| 144 | Iceland | 1,461 | 1,234 | 1,163 | 1,183 | 1,213 | 1,334 | 1,436 |
| 145 | French Polynesia | 1,424 | 1,428 | 1,426 | 1,419 | 1,439 | 1,418 | 1,400 |
| 146 | Djibouti | 1,423 | 1,384 | 1,444 | 1,501 | 1,651 | 1,789 | 1,745 |
| 147 | Belize | 1,361 | 1,175 | 1,320 | 1,113 | 2,121 | 2,452 | 2,858 |

=== <1,000 tonnes ===
| Rank | Country | 2022 | 2021 | 2020 | 2019 | 2018 | 2017 | 2016 |
|---|---|---|---|---|---|---|---|---|
| 148 | Barbados | 906 | 439 | 854 | 767 | 706 | 332 | 308 |
| 149 | Tonga | 853 | 852 | 857 | 849 | 851 | 870 | 826 |
| 150 | Grenada | 679 | 903 | 1,036 | 1,328 | 1,466 | 1,427 | 2,416 |
| 151 | East Timor | 584 | 586 | 585 | 581 | 593 | 580 | 570 |
| 152 | Papua New Guinea | 548 | 545 | 542 | 545 | 530 | 522 | 521 |
| 153 | Seychelles | 439 | 441 | 440 | 437 | 448 | 435 | 427 |
| 154 | Dominica | 418 | 419 | 418 | 418 | 420 | 417 | 417 |
| 155 | Gabon | 366 | 364 | 366 | 366 | 361 | 370 | 368 |
| 156 | Cook Islands | 281 | 281 | 280 | 281 | 281 | 280 | 282 |
| 157 | Saint Lucia | 273 | 234 | 224 | 275 | 315 | 240 | 267 |
| 158 | Maldives | 229 | 232 | 230 | 225 | 239 | 226 | 210 |
| 159 | Bhutan | 206 | 289 | 359 | 233 | 261 | 383 | 445 |
| 160 | Saint Kitts and Nevis | 175 | 188 | 107 | 112 | 174 | 152 | 132 |
| 161 | Brunei | 139 | 139 | 139 | 139 | 140 | 137 | 140 |
| 162 | Suriname | 108 | 384 | 874 | 1,186 | 1,532 | 1,442 | 1,500 |
| 163 | Estonia | 100 | 830 | 510 | 460 | 290 | 3,563 | 2,312 |
| 164 | Antigua and Barbuda | 91 | 71 | 35 | 47 | 86 | 179 | 426 |
| 165 | Hong Kong | 45 | 45 | 45 | 46 | 45 | 44 | 48 |
| 166 | Luxembourg | 30 | 50 | 10 | 10 | 10 | 17 | 17 |
| 167 | Singapore | 0 | 49 | 31 | 59 | 65 | 88 | 66 |
| 168 | Nauru | 0 | 0 | 0 | 0 | 0 | 1 | |
