= Iran Combine Manufacturing Company =

Iran Combine Manufacturing Company (ICM)
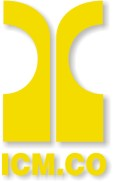
- Company type: Public company
- Traded as: TSE: COMB1; ISIN: IRO1COMB0003
- Industry: Agricultural Machinery; Heavy equipment
- Founded: 1969; 57 years ago
- Headquarters: Arak, Iran
- Area served: Worldwide
- Key people: Mohammad Jafar Safavid (Chairman & CEO)
- Products: Balers; Combines; Diesel engines; Forage equipment; Hay tools; Self-propelled sprayers; Seeding & Tillage equipment; Tractors
- Owner: Astan Quds Razavi (67%)
- Website: www.irancombine.com

Iran Combine Manufacturing Company (ICM) (Persian: کمباین‌سازی ایران) is the largest combine manufacturer in the Middle East that is located in Arak. ICM was established in 1969 under license of American John Deere.

== History ==
Iran combine Manufacturing Co. was established and registered in 1969 under the name of Jansaz (Ltd) and started production of agricultural machinery with a capacity of 20,000 tones per annum.

In 1970, the company was sold to a consortium led by American company John Deere, eventually changing its name to "Iran John Deere". However, in 1982, the company's ownership was changed to a joint stock share.

== Operations ==
In 2008, Managing director of Iran Combine Manufacturing said that China had announced readiness to establish a joint venture in the company.

ICM products have been exported to China since 1984, and since then, the company's distribution network has expanded to include Kazakhstan, Tajikistan, Pakistan, Afghanistan, Iraq, Uzbekistan, Zimbabwe, Spain and Venezuela.
