= Iranian Agriculture News Agency =

Iranian news agency focused on agriculture

- Website: http://www.iana.ir

Iranian Agriculture News Agency (IANA) is an Iranian Official news agency focused on agricultural issues of the world countries and introduces that of Iran to the world. Its start dates back to May 2004.

== Management ==
The managing director of this news agency is Kazem Shokri.

== Journalists ==
49 journalists are working in IANA.

== Groups ==
Currently eight news groups plus the Technical and Support group are working in IANA and nine deskmen take control of them.
