= Terrorism =

Use of violence to achieve political or ideological aims

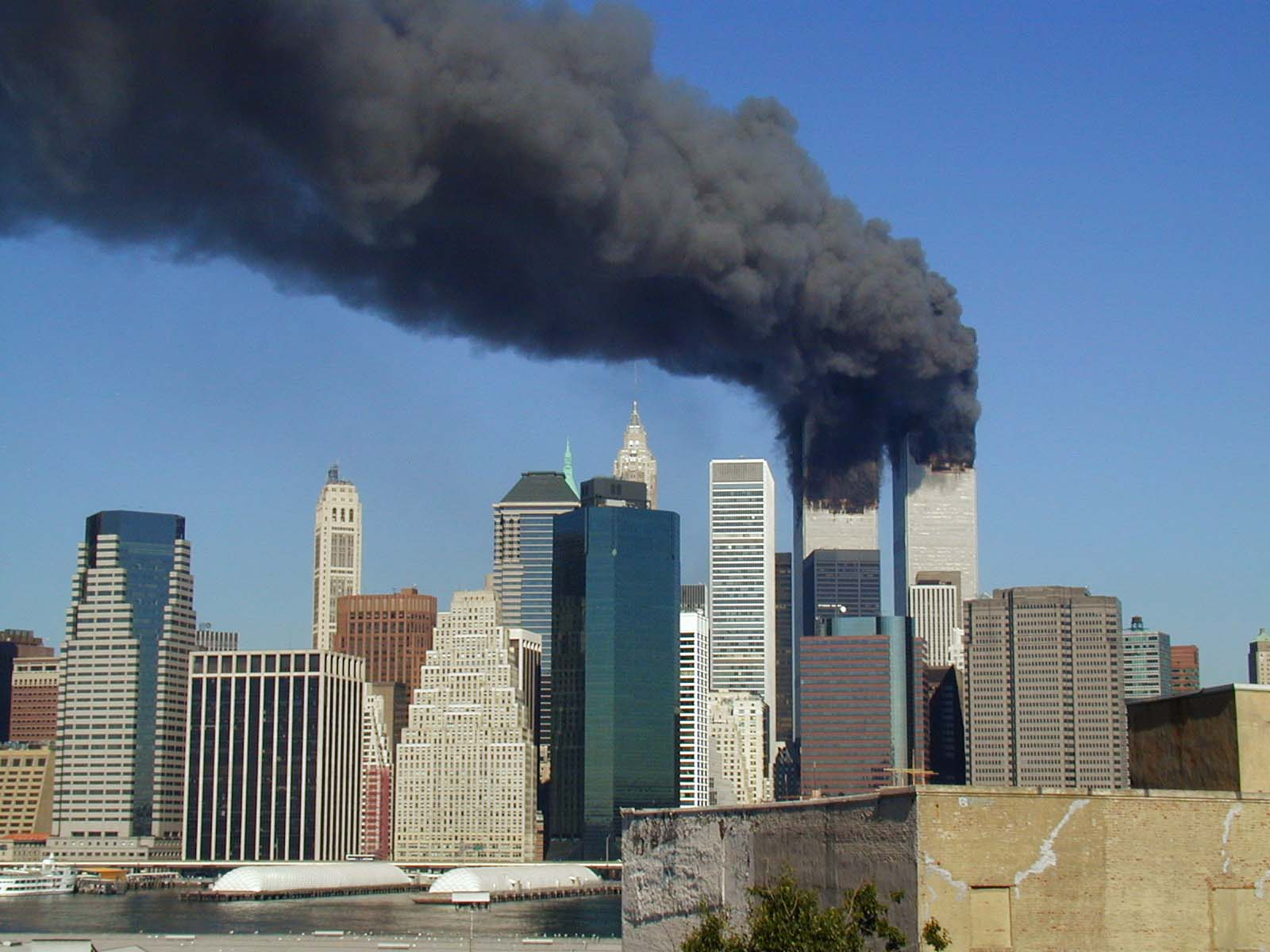
The Twin Towers of the World Trade Center burning during the September 11 attacks, the deadliest terrorist attack in history, planned by Osama bin Laden and carried out by al-Qaeda members in New York City on September 11, 2001

Terrorism, in its broadest sense, is the use of violence against non-combatants to achieve political or ideological aims. The term is used in this regard primarily to refer to intentional violence during peacetime or in the context of war against non-combatants. There are several different definitions of terrorism, without universal agreement on the precise meaning of the term. Different definitions of terrorism emphasize its randomness; the aims are to generally instill fear and to seek a broader impact, beyond the immediate effect on the victims that suffered the attack.

Modern terrorism, evolving from earlier iterations, employs various tactics to pursue political goals, often leveraging fear as a strategic tool to influence decision makers. By targeting densely populated public areas such as transportation hubs, airports, shopping centers, tourist attractions, and nightlife venues, terrorists aim to instil widespread insecurity, prompting policy changes through psychological manipulation and undermining confidence in security measures.

The terms "terrorist" and "terrorism" originated during the French Revolution of the late 18th century, but became widely used internationally and gained worldwide attention in the 1970s during the Troubles in Northern Ireland, the Basque conflict and the Israeli–Palestinian conflict. The increased use of suicide attacks from the 1980s onwards was typified by the September 11 attacks in the United States in 2001. The Global Terrorism Database, maintained by the University of Maryland, College Park, has recorded more than 61,000 incidents of non-state terrorism, resulting in at least 140,000 deaths between 2000 and 2014.

Various organizations and countries have used terrorism to achieve their objectives. These include left-wing and right-wing political organizations, nationalist groups, religious groups, revolutionaries, and ruling governments. In recent decades, hybrid terrorist organizations have emerged, incorporating both military and political arms. State terrorism, with its institutionalized instrumentation of terror tactics through massacres, genocides, forced disappearances, carpet bombings and torture, is a deadlier form of terrorism than non-state terrorism.

== Etymology and definition ==
=== Etymology ===
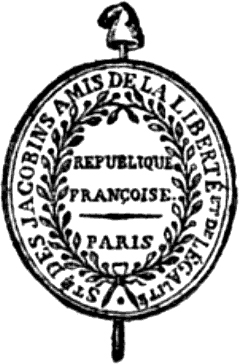
Seal of the Jacobin Club

The term "terrorism" itself was originally used to describe the actions of the Jacobin Club during the "Reign of Terror" in the French Revolution. "Terror is nothing other than justice, prompt, severe, inflexible", said Jacobin leader Maximilien Robespierre. In 1795, Edmund Burke denounced the Jacobins for letting "thousands of those hell-hounds called Terrorists ... loose on the people" of France. John Calvin's rule over Geneva in the 16th century has also been described as a reign of terror.

The terms "terrorism" and "terrorist" gained renewed currency in the 1970s as a result of the Palestine Liberation Organization (PLO), the Irish Republican Army (IRA), Basque Homeland and Liberty (Euskadi Ta Askatasuna, ETA), and the operations of groups such as the Red Army Faction. Leila Khaled was described as a terrorist in a 1970 issue of Life magazine. A number of books on terrorism were published in the 1970s. The topic came further to the fore after the 1983 Beirut barracks bombings and again after the 2001 September 11 attacks and the 2002 Bali bombings.

=== Definition ===
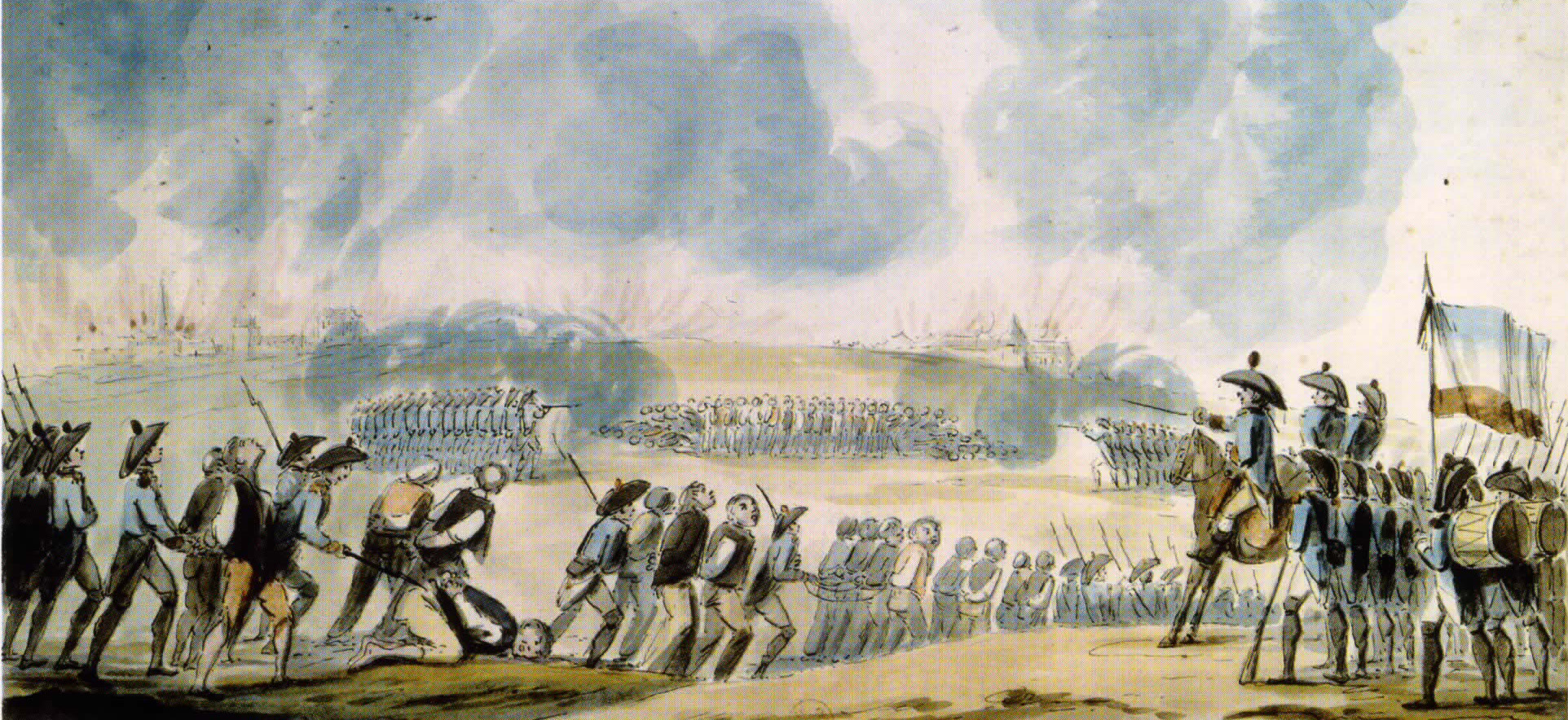
Mass killings in the Vendée during the Reign of Terror in France, 1793

No definition of terrorism has gained universal agreement. Challenges emerge due to the politicised and emotionally charged nature of the term, the double standards used in applying it, and disagreement over the nature of terrorist acts and limits of the right to self-determination. Harvard law professor Richard Baxter, a leading expert on the law of war, was a skeptic: "We have cause to regret that a legal concept of 'terrorism' was ever inflicted upon us. The term is imprecise; it is ambiguous; and above all, it serves no operative legal purpose."

Different legal systems and government agencies employ diverse definitions of terrorism, with governments showing hesitation in establishing a universally accepted, legally binding definition. The international community has been slow to formulate a universally agreed, legally binding definition of this crime, and has been unable to conclude a Comprehensive Convention on International Terrorism that incorporates a single, all-encompassing, legally binding, criminal law definition of terrorism. These difficulties arise from the fact that the term "terrorism" is politically and emotionally charged. The international community has instead adopted a series of sectoral conventions, which do not have terrorism as a single cohesive criminal offense of terrorism. Rather, sectoral conventions criminalizes various types of criminal activities involved in the commission of terrorism (for example homicide). Terrorism can be seen as a high-impact subset of violent extremism.

Counterterrorism analyst Bruce Hoffman has noted that it is not only individual agencies within the same governmental apparatus that cannot agree on a single definition of terrorism; experts and other long-established scholars in the field are equally incapable of reaching a consensus. In 1992, terrorism studies scholar Alex P. Schmid proposed a simple definition to the United Nations Commission on Crime Prevention and Criminal Justice (CCPCJ) as "peacetime equivalents of war crimes", but it was not accepted. In 2006, it was estimated that there were over 109 different definitions of terrorism.

== History ==
=== Pre-modern terrorism ===
Early published studies like Paul Wilkinson considered terrorism a product of 19th-century revolutionary politics. Technological developments like the pistol and dynamite made possible the relentless onslaught of successful attacks and assassinations that shook the 19th-century. For the most part, scholars considered terrorism a modern phenomenon until David C. Rapoport published his seminal article Fear and Trembling: Terrorism in Three Religious Traditions in 1984.

Rapoport proposed three case studies to demonstrate "ancient lineage" of religious terrorism, which he called "sacred terror": the "Thugs", the Order of Assassins and the Jewish Sicarii Zealots. Rapoport argued religious terrorism has been ongoing since ancient times and that "there are signs that it is reviving in new and unusual forms". He is the first to propose that religious doctrines were more important than political rationales for some terrorist groups. Rapoport's work has since become the basis of the model of "New Terrorism" proposed by Bruce Hoffman and developed by other scholars. "New Terrorism" has had an unparalleled impact on policymaking. Critics have pointed out that the model is politically charged and over-simplified. The underlying historical assertions have received less critical attention. According to The Oxford Handbook on the History of Terrorism:

Since the publication of Rapoport's article, it has become seemingly pre-requisite for standard works on terrorism to cite the three case studies and to reproduce uncritically its findings. In lieu of empirical research, authors tend to crudely paraphrase Rapoport and the assumed relevance of "Thuggee" to the study of modern terrorism is taken for granted. Yet the significance of the article is not simply a matter of citations―it has also provided the foundation for what has become known as the "New Terrorism" paradigm. While Rapoport did not suggest which late 20th century groups might exemplify the implied recurrence of "holy terror", Bruce Hoffman, recognized today as one of the world's leading terrorism experts, did not hesitate to do so. A decade after Rapoport's article. Hoffman picked up the mantle and taking the three case studies as inspiration, he formulated a model of contemporary "holy terror" or, as he defined it, "terrorism motivated by a religious imperative". Completely distinct from "secular terrorists", Hoffman argued that "religious terrorists" carry out indiscriminate acts of violence as a divine duty with no consideration for political efficacy―their aim is transcendental and "holy terror" constitutes an end in itself. Hoffman's concept has since been taken up and developed by a number of other writers, including Walter Laquer, Steven Simon and Daniel Benjamen, and rebranded as the "New Terrorism".

=== Birth of modern terrorism (1850–1890s) ===
Arguably, the first organization to use modern terrorist techniques was the Irish Republican Brotherhood, founded in 1858 as a revolutionary Irish nationalist group that carried out attacks in England. The group initiated the Fenian dynamite campaign in 1881, one of the first modern terror campaigns. Instead of earlier forms of terrorism based on political assassination, this campaign used timed explosives with the express aim of sowing fear in the very heart of metropolitan Britain, in order to achieve political gains.

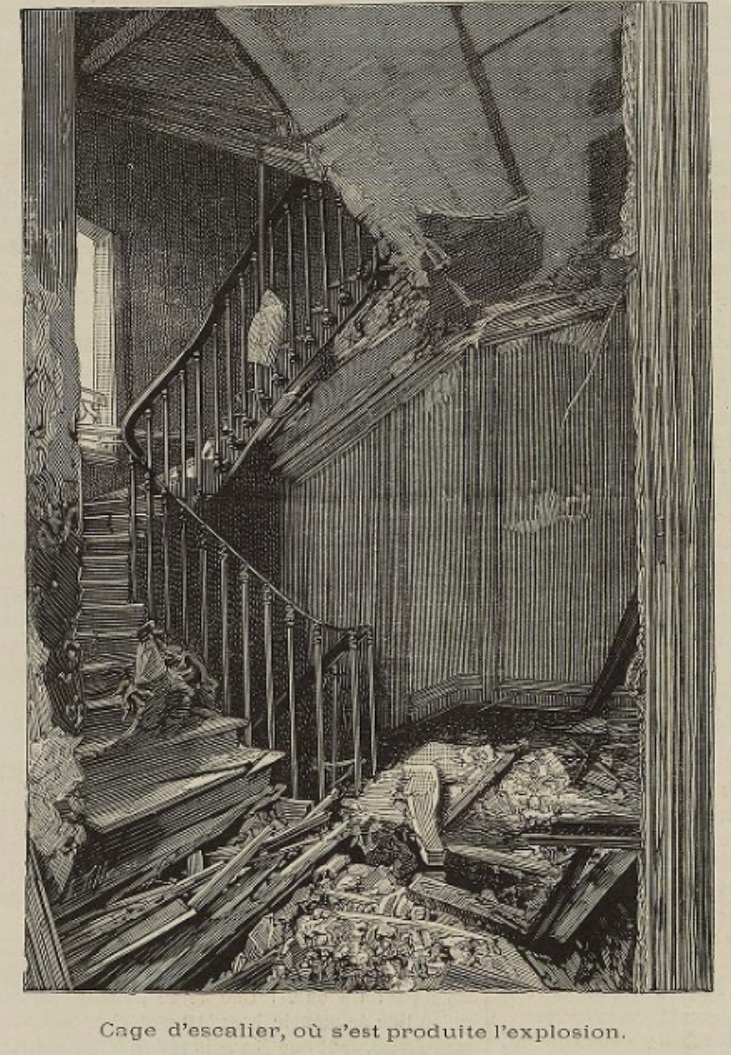
Representation of the aftermath of the Saint Germain bombing in L'Illustration (March 19, 1892), an attack that ushered in the Ère des attentats

Another early terrorist-type group was Narodnaya Volya, founded in Russia in 1878 as a revolutionary anarchist group inspired by Sergei Nechayev and "propaganda by the deed" theorist Carlo Pisacane. The group developed ideas—such as targeted killing of the 'leaders of oppression', which were to become the hallmark of subsequent violence by small non-state groups, and they were convinced that the developing technologies of the age—such as the invention of dynamite, which they were the first anarchist group to make widespread use of—enabled them to strike directly and with discrimination.

In the Western world, and more specifically in France, the repression faced by anarchists from the state led, in the early 1890s, to France's entry into the Ère des attentats (1892–1894). This period, characterized by a surge in terrorist acts following Ravachol's bombings, saw several shifts that pushed terrorism toward modern terrorism. As with the Fenian campaign, terrorism shifted from being person-based to location-based, starting with the first attack of that period, the Saint-Germain bombing.

However, other major evolutions emerged during this period: the apparition of lone wolves and the birth of mass or indiscriminate terrorism. Indeed, in the second half of the Ère des attentats, three incidents laid the foundation for mass terrorism within a few months of each other. These were the Liceu bombing, the 13 November 1893 stabbing, and the Café Terminus attack. In each of these attacks, the perpetrators targeted not a specific individual but a collective enemy. Émile Henry, in particular, responsible for the Café Terminus bombing, explicitly claimed the birth of this new form of terrorism, stating that he wanted to 'strike at random'.

=== Modern terrorism (1900–present) ===
In 1920 Leon Trotsky wrote Terrorism and Communism to justify the Red Terror and defend the moral superiority of revolutionary terrorism.

The assassination of the Empress of Austria Elisabeth in 1898 resulted in the International Conference of Rome for the Social Defense Against Anarchists, the first international conference against terrorism.

According to Bruce Hoffman of the RAND Corporation, in 1980, 2 out of 64 terrorist groups were categorized as having religious motivation while in 1995, almost half (26 out of 56) were religiously motivated with the majority having Islam as their guiding force.

Terrorism deaths

terrorist attacks

Injuries from terrorist attacks

Terrorism deaths rate

== Types of terrorism ==
Depending on the country, the political system, and the time in history, the types of terrorism are varying.

Number of failed, foiled or successful terrorist attacks by type and year within the European Union. Source: Europol.

In early 1975, the Law Enforcement Assistant Administration in the United States formed the National Advisory Committee on Criminal Justice Standards and Goals. One of the five volumes that the committee wrote was titled Disorders and Terrorism, produced by the Task Force on Disorders and Terrorism under the direction of H. H. A. Cooper, Director of the Task Force staff.

The Task Force defines terrorism as "a tactic or technique by means of which a violent act or the threat thereof is used for the prime purpose of creating overwhelming fear for coercive purposes". It classified disorders and terrorism into seven categories:

- Civil disorder – A form of collective violence interfering with the peace, security, and normal functioning of the community.
- Political terrorism – Violent criminal behaviour designed primarily to generate fear in the community, or substantial segment of it, for political purposes.
- Non-Political terrorism – Terrorism that is not aimed at political purposes, but which exhibits "conscious design to create and maintain a high degree of fear for coercive purposes, but the end is individual or collective gain rather than the achievement of a political objective".
- Anonymous terrorism – In the two decades prior to 2016–19, "fewer than half" of all terrorist attacks were either "claimed by their perpetrators or convincingly attributed by governments to specific terrorist groups". A number of theories have been advanced as to why this has happened.
- Quasi-terrorism – The activities incidental to the commission of crimes of violence that are similar in form and method to genuine terrorism, but which nevertheless lack its essential ingredient. It is not the main purpose of the quasi-terrorists to induce terror in the immediate victim as in the case of genuine terrorism, but the quasi-terrorist uses the modalities and techniques of the genuine terrorist and produces similar consequences and reaction. For example, the fleeing felon who takes hostages is a quasi-terrorist, whose methods are similar to those of the genuine terrorist but whose purposes are quite different.
- Limited political terrorism – Genuine political terrorism is characterized by a revolutionary approach; limited political terrorism refers to "acts of terrorism which are committed for ideological or political motives but which are not part of a concerted campaign to capture control of the state".
- Official or state terrorism – "referring to nations whose rule is based upon fear and oppression that reach similar to terrorism or such proportions". It may be referred to as Structural Terrorism defined broadly as terrorist acts carried out by governments in pursuit of political objectives, often as part of their foreign policy.

Other sources have defined the typology of terrorism in different ways, for example, broadly classifying it into domestic terrorism and international terrorism, or using categories such as vigilante terrorism or insurgent terrorism. Some ways the typology of terrorism may be defined are:

- Political terrorism
  - Sub-state terrorism
    - Social revolutionary terrorism
    - Nationalist-separatist terrorism
    - Religious extremist terrorism
      - Religious fundamentalist Terrorism
      - New religions terrorism
    - Right-wing terrorism
    - Left-wing terrorism
      - Communist terrorism
  - State-sponsored terrorism
  - State terrorism
- Criminal terrorism
- Pathological terrorism

== Causes and motivations ==
Terrorist acts frequently have a political purpose based on self-determination claims, ethnonationalist frustrations, single issue causes (like abortion or the environment), or other ideological or religious causes that terrorists claim are a moral justification for their violent acts.

=== Choice of terrorism as a tactic ===
Individuals and groups choose terrorism as a tactic because it can:

- Act as a form of asymmetric warfare in order to directly force a government to agree to demands
- Intimidate a group of people into capitulating to the demands in order to avoid future injury
- Get attention and thus political support for a cause
- Directly inspire more people to the cause (such as revolutionary acts) – propaganda of the deed
- Indirectly inspire more people to the cause by provoking a hostile response or over-reaction from enemies to the cause

Attacks on "collaborators" are used to intimidate people from cooperating with the state in order to undermine state control. This strategy was used in Ireland, in Kenya, in Algeria and in Cyprus during their independence struggles.

Stated motives for the September 11 attacks included inspiring more fighters to join the cause of repelling the United States from Muslim countries with a successful high-profile attack. The attacks prompted some criticism from domestic and international observers regarding perceived injustices in U.S. foreign policy that provoked the attacks, but the larger practical effect was that the United States government declared a war on terror that resulted in substantial military engagements in several Muslim-majority countries. Various commentators have inferred that al-Qaeda expected a military response and welcomed it as a provocation that would result in more Muslims fighting the United States. Some commentators believe that the resulting anger and suspicion directed toward innocent Muslims living in Western countries and the indignities inflicted upon them by security forces and the general public also contributes to radicalization of new recruits. Despite criticism that the Iraqi government had no involvement with the September 11 attacks, Bush declared the 2003 invasion of Iraq to be part of the war on terror. The resulting backlash and instability enabled the rise of Islamic State of Iraq and the Levant and the temporary creation of an Islamic caliphate holding territory in Iraq and Syria, until ISIL lost its territory through military defeats.

Attacks used to draw international attention to struggles that are otherwise unreported have included the Palestinian airplane hijackings in 1970 and the 1975 Dutch train hostage crisis.

=== Causes motivating terrorism ===
Specific political or social causes have included:

- Independence or separatist movements
- Irredentist movements
- Adoption of a particular political philosophy, such as socialism (left-wing terrorism), anarchism, or fascism (possibly through a coup or as an ideology of an independence or separatist movement)
- Environmental protection (eco-terrorism)
- Supremacism of a particular group
  - Preventing a rival group from sharing or occupying a particular territory (such as by discouraging immigration or encouraging flight)
  - Subjugation of a particular population (such as lynching of African Americans)
- Spread or dominance of a particular religion – religious terrorism
- Ending perceived government oppression
- Responding to a violent act (for example, tit-for-tat attacks in the Israeli–Palestinian conflict, in The Troubles in Northern Ireland, or Timothy McVeigh's revenge for the Waco siege and Ruby Ridge incident)

Causes for right-wing terrorism have included white nationalism, ethnonationalism, fascism, anti-socialism, the anti-abortion movement, and tax resistance.

Sometimes terrorists on the same side fight for different reasons. For example, in the Chechen–Russian conflict, secular Chechens using terrorist tactics fighting for national independence are allied with radical Islamist terrorists who have arrived from other countries.

=== Personal and social factors ===
Various personal and social factors may influence the personal choice of whether to join a terrorist group or attempt an act of terror, including:

- Identity, including affiliation with a particular culture, ethnicity, or religion
- Previous exposure to violence
- Financial reward (for example, the Palestinian Authority Martyrs Fund)
- Mental illness
- Social isolation
- Perception that the cause responds to a profound injustice or indignity

A report conducted by Paul Gill, John Horgan and Paige Deckert found that for "lone wolf" terrorists:

- 43% were motivated by religious beliefs
- 32% had pre-existing mental health disorders, while many more are found to have mental health problems upon arrest
- At least 37% lived alone at the time of their event planning or execution, a further 26% lived with others, and no data were available for the remaining cases
- 40% were unemployed at the time of their arrest or terrorist event
- 19% subjectively experienced being disrespected by others
- 14% percent experienced being the victim of verbal or physical assault

Ariel Merari, a psychologist who has studied the psychological profiles of suicide terrorists since 1983 through media reports that contained biographical details, interviews with the suicides' families, and interviews with jailed would-be suicide attackers, concluded that they were unlikely to be psychologically abnormal. In comparison to economic theories of criminal behaviour, Scott Atran found that suicide terrorists exhibit none of the socially dysfunctional attributes—such as fatherless, friendless, jobless situations—or suicidal symptoms. By which he means, they do not kill themselves simply out of hopelessness or a sense of 'having nothing to lose'.

Abrahm suggests that terrorist organizations do not select terrorism for its political effectiveness. Individual terrorists tend to be motivated more by a desire for social solidarity with other members of their organization than by political platforms or strategic objectives, which are often murky and undefined.

Michael Mousseau shows possible relationships between the type of economy within a country and ideology associated with terrorism. Many terrorists have a history of domestic violence.

=== Religious terrorism ===
According to the Global Terrorism Index by the University of Maryland, College Park, religious extremism has overtaken national separatism and become the main driver of terrorist attacks around the world. Since 9/11 there has been a five-fold increase in deaths from terrorist attacks. The majority of incidents over the past several years can be tied to groups with a religious agenda. Before 2000, it was nationalist separatist terrorist organizations such as the IRA and Chechen rebels who were behind the most attacks. The number of incidents from nationalist separatist groups has remained relatively stable in the years since while religious extremism has grown. The prevalence of Islamist groups in Iraq, Afghanistan, Pakistan, Nigeria and Syria is the main driver behind these trends.

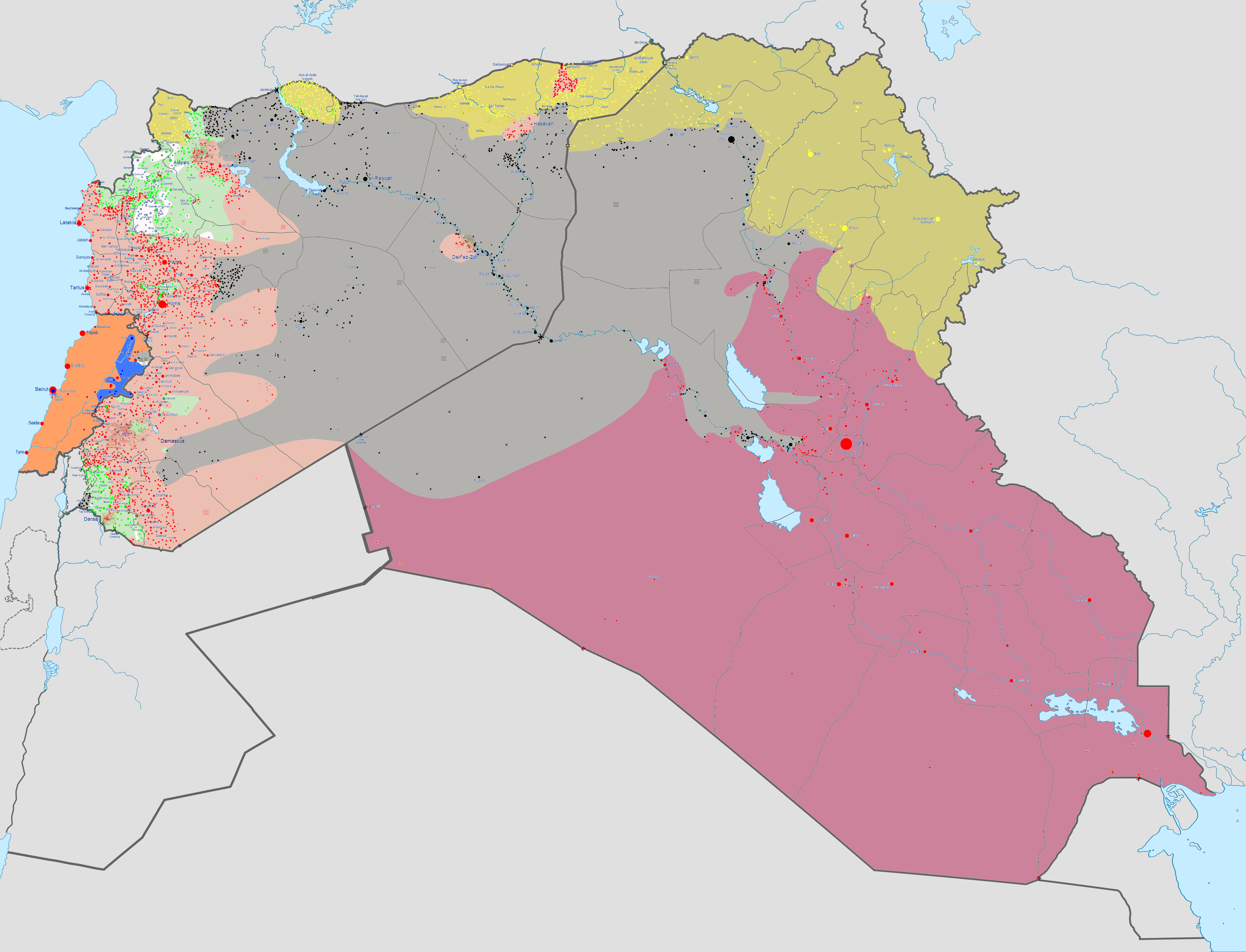
The Islamic State (IS) is a transnational Sunni Islamist insurgent and terrorist group. IS territory, in grey, at the time of its greatest territorial extent in May 2015. Map legend: Islamic State; Iraqi government; Syrian government; Lebanese government; Iraqi Kurdistan forces; Syrian Kurdistan forces; Syrian opposition forces; Turkish Armed Forces; Al-Nusra Front; Hezbollah; Note: Iraq and Syria contain large desert areas with sparse populations. These areas are mapped as under the control of forces holding roads and towns within them.

Hamas, the main Islamist movement in the Palestinian territories, was formed by Palestinian Imam Ahmed Yassin in 1987. Some scholars, including constitutional law professor Alexander Tsesis, have voiced concerns over the 1988 Hamas Charter's apparent advocacy of genocidal aspirations. In the periods of 1994–1996 and 2001–2007, Hamas orchestrated a series of suicide bombings, primarily directed at civilian targets in Israel, killing over 1,000 Israeli civilians.

Four of the terrorist groups that have been most active since 2001 are Boko Haram, Al-Qaeda, the Taliban, the Pakistani Taliban, and ISIL. These groups have been most active in Iraq, Afghanistan, Pakistan, Nigeria and Syria. In 2013 eighty percent of all deaths from terrorism occurred in these five countries. In 2015 four Islamic extremist groups were responsible for 74% of all deaths from Islamic terrorism: ISIS, Boko Haram, the Taliban, and Al-Qaeda, according to the Global Terrorism Index 2016. Since approximately 2000, these incidents have occurred on a global scale, affecting not only Muslim-majority states in Africa and Asia, but also states with non-Muslim majority such as United States, United Kingdom, France, Germany, Spain, Belgium, Sweden, Russia, Australia, Canada, Sri Lanka, Israel, China, India and Philippines. Such attacks have targeted both Muslims and non-Muslims, however the majority affect Muslims themselves.

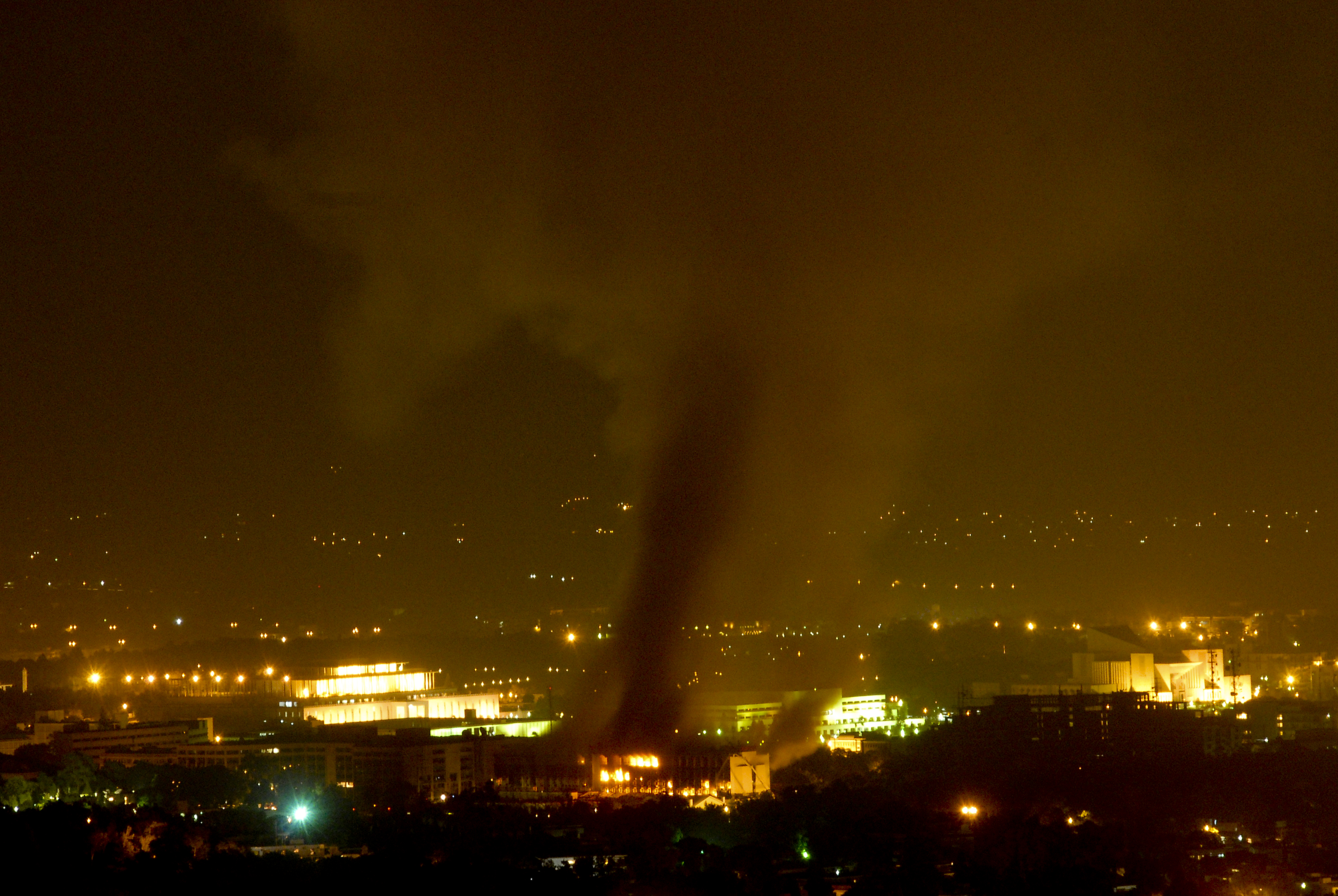
Islamabad Marriott Hotel bombing. Approximately 35,000 Pakistanis died from terrorist attacks between 2001 and 2011.

Terrorism in Pakistan has become a great problem. From the summer of 2007 until late 2009, more than 1,500 people were killed in suicide and other attacks on civilians for reasons attributed to a number of causes—sectarian violence between Sunni and Shia Muslims; easy availability of guns and explosives; the existence of a "Kalashnikov culture"; an influx of ideologically driven Muslims based in or near Pakistan, who originated from various nations around the world and the subsequent war against the pro-Soviet Afghans in the 1980s which blew back into Pakistan; the presence of Islamist insurgent groups and forces such as the Taliban and Lashkar-e-Taiba. On July 2, 2013, in Lahore, 50 Muslim scholars of the Sunni Ittehad Council (SIC) issued a collective fatwa against suicide bombings, the killing of innocent people, bomb attacks, and targeted killings declaring them as Haraam or forbidden.

In 2015, the Southern Poverty Law Center released a report on domestic terrorism in the United States. The report (titled The Age of the Wolf) analysed 62 incidents and found that, between 2009 and 2015, "more people have been killed in America by non-Islamic domestic terrorists than jihadists." The "virulent racist and antisemitic" ideology of the ultra-right wing Christian Identity movement is usually accompanied by anti-government sentiments. Adherents of Christian Identity are not connected with specific Christian denominations, and they believe that whites of European descent can be traced back to the "Lost Tribes of Israel". Adherents have committed hate crimes, bombings and other acts of terrorism, including the Centennial Olympic Park bombing. Its influence ranges from the Ku Klux Klan and neo-Nazi groups to the anti-government militia and sovereign citizen movements.

== Democracy and domestic terrorism ==
Terrorism is most common in nations with intermediate political freedom, and it is least common in the most democratic nations.

Some examples of terrorism in non-democratic nations include ETA in Spain under Francisco Franco (although the group's activities increased sharply after Franco's death), the Organization of Ukrainian Nationalists in pre-war Poland, the Shining Path in Peru under Alberto Fujimori, the Kurdistan Workers Party when Turkey was ruled by military leaders, and the ANC in South Africa.

According to Boaz Ganor, "Modern terrorism sees the liberal democratic state, in all its variations, as the perfect launching pad and a target for its attacks. Moreover, some terrorist organizations—particularly Islamist-jihadist organizations—have chosen to cynically exploit democratic values and institutions to gain power and status, promote their interests, and achieve internal and international legitimacy". Jihadist militants have shown an ambivalent view towards democracy, as they both exploit it for their ends and oppose it in their ideology. Various quotes from jihadist leaders note their disdain for democracy and their efforts to undermine it in favor of Islamic rule. Democracies, such as Japan, the United Kingdom, the United States, Israel, Indonesia, India, Spain, Germany, Italy and the Philippines, have all experienced domestic terrorism.

While a democratic nation espousing civil liberties may claim a sense of higher moral ground than other regimes, an act of terrorism within such a state may cause a dilemma: whether to maintain its civil liberties and thus risk being perceived as ineffective in dealing with the problem; or alternatively to restrict its civil liberties and thus risk delegitimizing its claim of supporting civil liberties. For this reason, homegrown terrorism has started to be seen as a greater threat, as stated by former CIA Director Michael Hayden. This dilemma, some social theorists would conclude, may very well play into the initial plans of the acting terrorist(s); namely, to delegitimize the state and cause a systematic shift towards anarchy via the accumulation of negative sentiments towards the state system.

== Perpetrators ==
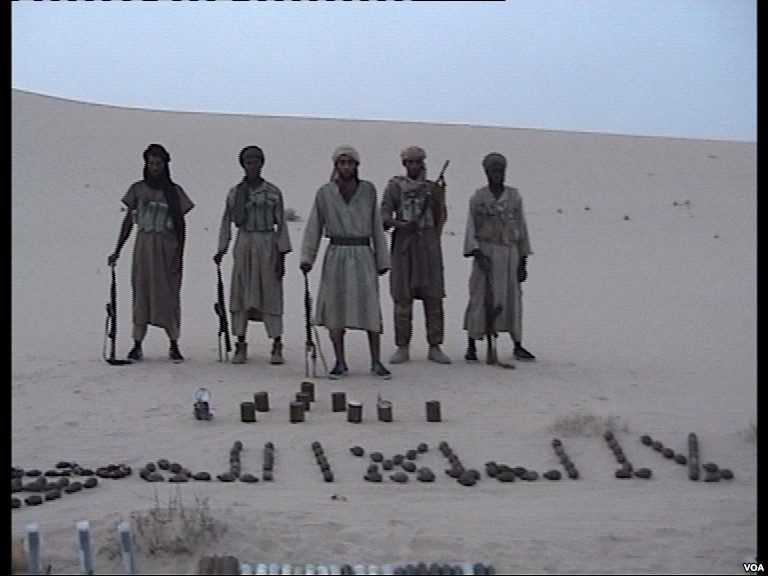
Al-Qaeda in Maghreb members pose with weapons spelling out the Shahada.

The perpetrators of acts of terrorism can be individuals, groups, or states. According to some definitions, clandestine or semi-clandestine state actors may carry out terrorist acts outside the framework of a state of war. The most common image of terrorism is that it is carried out by small and secretive cells, highly motivated to serve a particular cause and many of the most deadly operations in recent times, such as the September 11 attacks, the London underground bombing, 2008 Mumbai attacks, the 2014 Peshawar school massacre and the 2002 Bali bombings were planned and carried out by a close clique, composed of close friends, family members and other strong social networks. These groups benefited from the free flow of information and efficient telecommunications to succeed where others had failed.

Over the years, much research has been conducted to distill a terrorist profile to explain these individuals' actions through their psychology and socio-economic circumstances. Some specialists highlight the lack of evidence supporting the idea that terrorists are typically psychologically disturbed. The careful planning and detailed execution seen in many terrorist acts are not characteristics generally associated with mentally unstable individuals. Others, like Roderick Hindery, have sought to discern profiles in the propaganda tactics used by terrorists. Some security organizations designate these groups as violent non-state actors. A 2007 study by economist Alan B. Krueger found that terrorists were less likely to come from an impoverished background (28 percent versus 33 percent) and more likely to have at least a high-school education (47 percent versus 38 percent). Another analysis found only 16 percent of Palestinian terrorists came from impoverished families, versus 30 percent of male Palestinians, and over 60 percent had gone beyond high school, versus 15 percent of the populace.

To avoid detection, a terrorist will look, dress, and behave normally until executing the assigned mission. Some claim that attempts to profile terrorists based on personality, physical, or sociological traits are not useful. The physical and behavioral description of the terrorist could describe almost any normal person. The majority of terrorist attacks are carried out by military age men, aged 16 to 40.

=== Non-state groups ===
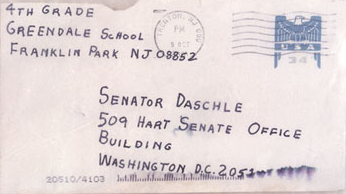
There is speculation that the 2001 anthrax attacks were the work of a lone wolf.

Groups not part of the state apparatus of in opposition to the state are most commonly referred to as a "terrorist" in the media.

According to the Global Terrorism Database, the most active terrorist group in the period 1970 to 2010 was Shining Path (with 4,517 attacks), followed by Farabundo Marti National Liberation Front (FMLN), Irish Republican Army (IRA), Basque Homeland and Liberty (Euskadi Ta Askatasuna, ETA), Revolutionary Armed Forces of Colombia (FARC), Taliban, Liberation Tigers of Tamil Eelam, New People's Army, National Liberation Army of Colombia (ELN), and Kurdistan Workers Party (PKK).

Israel has had problems with religious terrorism even before independence in 1948. During British mandate over Palestine, the secular Irgun were among the Zionist groups labelled as terrorist organisations by the British authorities and United Nations, for violent terror attacks against Britons and Arabs. Another extremist group, the Lehi, openly declared its members as "terrorists". Historian William Cleveland stated many Jews justified any action, even terrorism, taken in the cause of the creation of a Jewish state. In 1995, Yigal Amir assassinated Israeli Prime Minister Yitzhak Rabin. For Amir, killing Rabin was an exemplary act that symbolized the fight against an illegitimate government that was prepared to cede Jewish Holy Land to the Palestinians. Members of Kach, a Jewish ultranationalist party, employed terrorist tactics in pursuit of what they viewed as religious imperatives. Israel and a few other countries have designated the party as a terrorist group.

=== Funding ===
State sponsors have constituted a major form of funding; for example, Palestine Liberation Organization, Democratic Front for the Liberation of Palestine and other groups sometimes considered to be terrorist organizations, were funded by the Soviet Union. Iran has provided funds, training, and weapons to organizations such as Lebanese Shi'ite group Hezbollah, the Yemenite Houthi movement, and Palestinian factions such as Hamas and Islamic Jihad. Iranian funding for Hamas is estimated to reach several hundred million dollars annually. These groups and others have played significant roles in Iran's foreign policy and served as proxies in conflicts. The Stern Gang received funding from Italian Fascist officers in Beirut to undermine the British authorities in Palestine.

"Revolutionary tax" is another major form of funding, and essentially a euphemism for "protection money". Revolutionary taxes "play a secondary role as one other means of intimidating the target population".

Other major sources of funding include kidnapping for ransoms, smuggling (including wildlife smuggling), fraud, and robbery. The Islamic State in Iraq and the Levant has reportedly received funding "via private donations from the Gulf states". Irish Republican militants, primarily the Provisional Irish Republican Army and the Irish National Liberation Army, and Loyalist paramilitaries, primarily the Ulster Volunteer Force and Ulster Defence Association, received far more financing from criminal and legitimate activities within the British Isles than overseas donations, including Libyan dictator Muammar Gaddafi and NORAID (see Paramilitary finances in the Troubles for more information).

The Financial Action Task Force is an inter-governmental body whose mandate, since October 2001, has included combating terrorist financing.

== Tactics ==
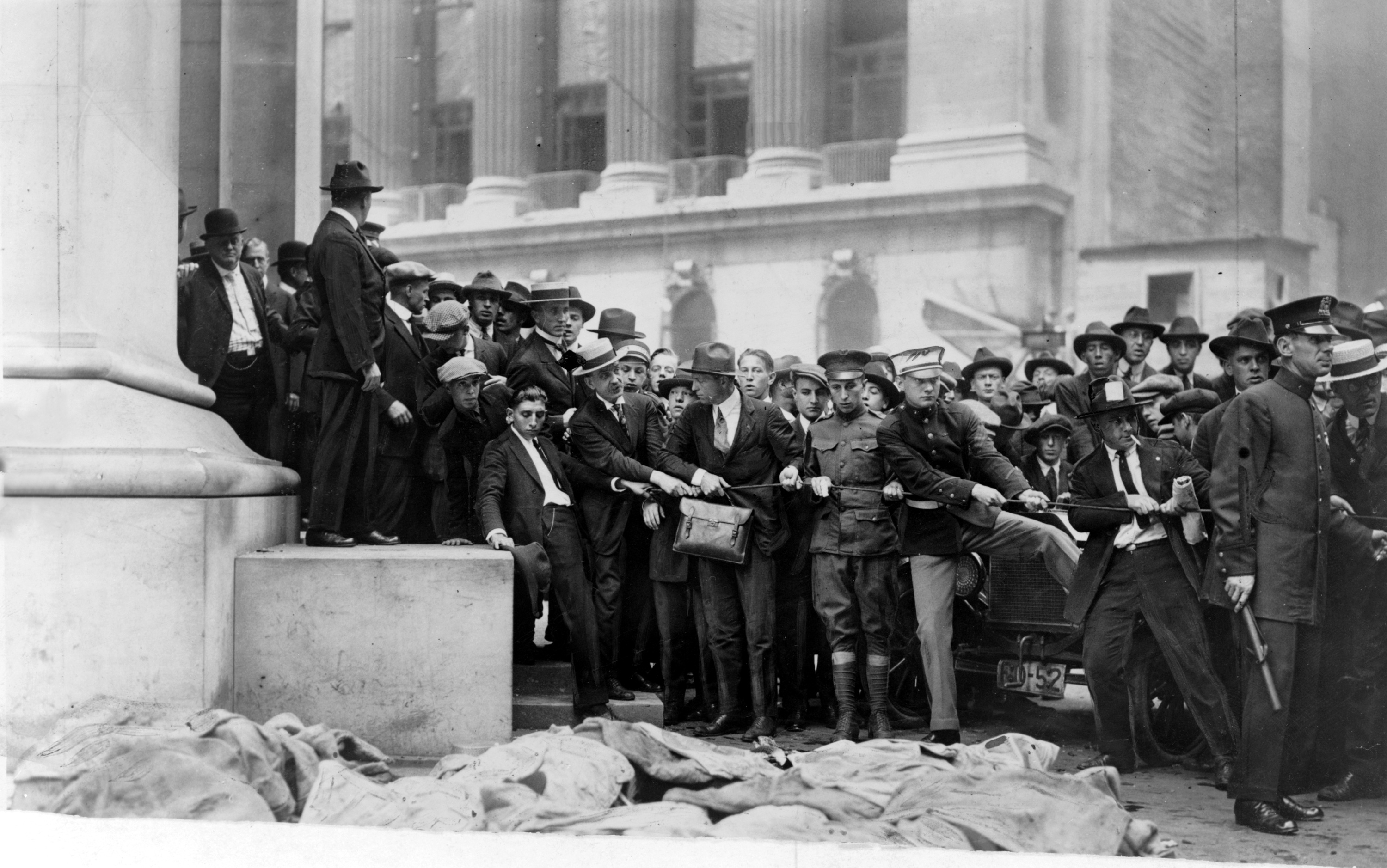
The Wall Street bombing at noon on September 16, 1920, killed thirty-eight people and injured several hundred. The perpetrators were never caught.

Terrorist attacks are often targeted to maximize fear and publicity, most frequently using explosives. Terrorist groups usually methodically plan attacks in advance, and may train participants, plant undercover agents, and raise money from supporters or through organized crime. Communications occur through modern telecommunications, or through old-fashioned methods such as couriers. There is concern about terrorist attacks employing weapons of mass destruction. Some academics have argued that while it is often assumed terrorism is intended to spread fear, this is not necessarily true, with fear instead being a by-product of the terrorist's actions, while their intentions may be to avenge fallen comrades or destroy their perceived enemies.

Terrorism is a form of asymmetric warfare and is more common when direct conventional warfare will not be effective because opposing forces vary greatly in power. Yuval Harari argues that the peacefulness of modern states makes them paradoxically more vulnerable to terrorism than pre-modern states. Harari argues that because modern states have committed themselves to reducing political violence to almost zero, terrorists can, by creating political violence, threaten the very foundations of the legitimacy of the modern state. This is in contrast to pre-modern states, where violence was a routine and recognised aspect of politics at all levels, making political violence unremarkable. Terrorism thus shocks the population of a modern state far more than a pre-modern one and consequently the state is forced to overreact in an excessive, costly and spectacular manner, which is often what the terrorists desire.

The type of people terrorists will target is dependent upon the ideology of the terrorists. A terrorist's ideology will create a class of "legitimate targets" who are deemed as its enemies and who are permitted to be targeted. This ideology will also allow the terrorists to place the blame on the victim, who is viewed as being responsible for the violence in the first place.

=== Attack types ===
Stabbing attacks, a historical tactic, have reemerged as a prevalent form of terrorism in the 21st century, notably during the 2010s and 2020s. This resurgence originated with the GIA in the 1990s and later expanded among Palestinian terrorists and Islamic State militants. The trend gained momentum with a wave of "lone wolf" terrorist stabbing attacks by Palestinians targeting Israelis beginning in 2015. Subsequently, this pattern extended to Europe during the surge of Islamic terrorism in the 2010s, witnessing "at least" 10 stabbing attacks allegedly motivated by Islamic extremism by the spring of 2017, with France experiencing a notable concentration of such incidents.

=== Media spectacle ===
Terrorists may attempt to use the media to spread their message or manipulate their target audience. Shamil Basayev used this tactic during the Budyonnovsk hospital hostage crisis and again in the Moscow theater hostage crisis. Terrorists may also target national symbols for attention. Walter Lacquer wrote that "terrorism was always, to a large extent, about public relations and propaganda ('Propaganda by Deed' had been the slogan in the nineteenth century)".

The El Al Flight 426 hijacking is considered a turning point for modern terrorism studies. The Popular Front for the Liberation of Palestine (PFLP) realized they could combine the tactics of targeting national symbols and civilians (in this case as hostages) to generate a mass media spectacle. Zehdi Labib Terzi made a public statement about this in 1976: "The first several hijackings aroused the consciousness of the world and awakened the media and world opinion much more ― and more effectively ― than 20 years of pleading at the United Nations".

==== Mass media ====
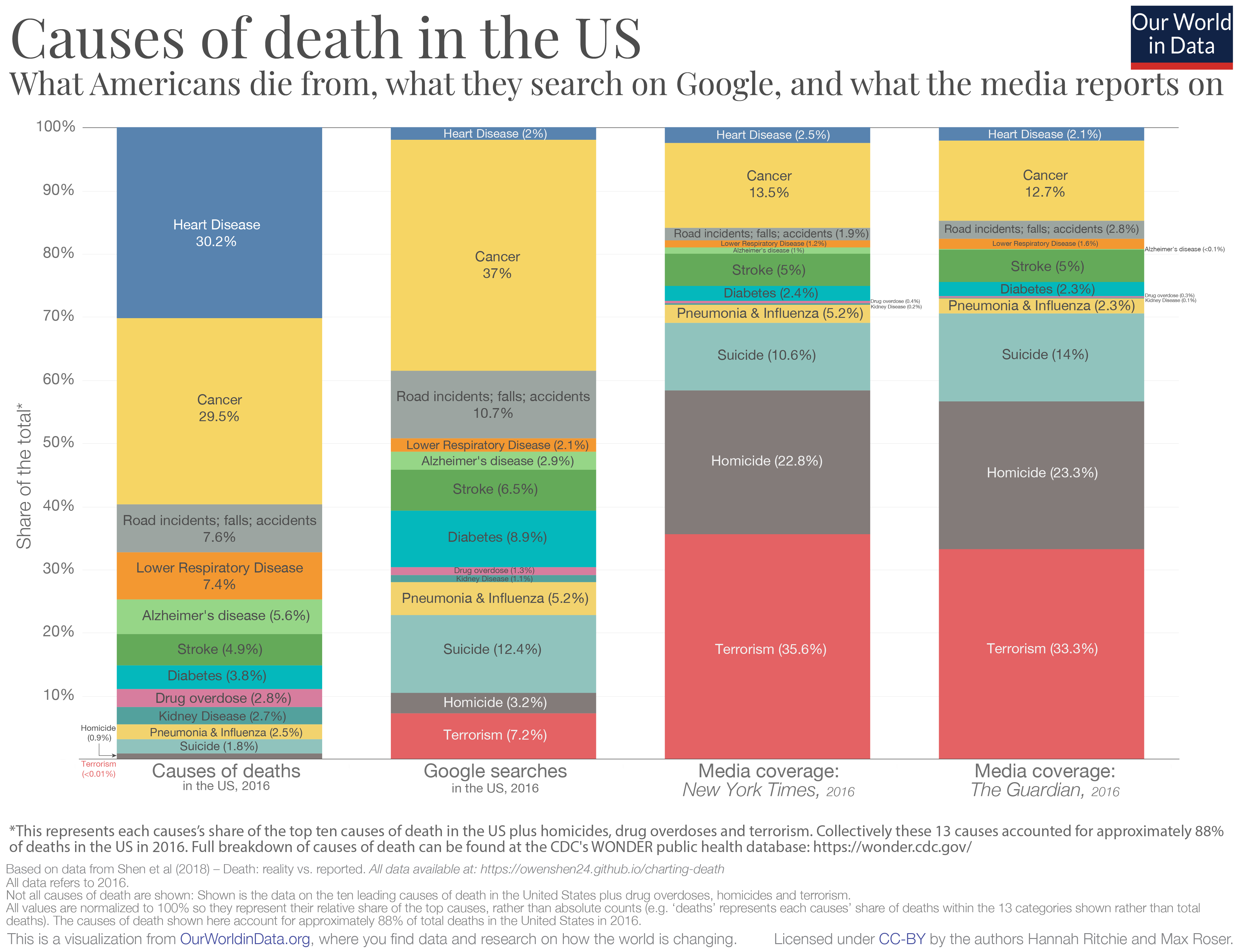
Causes of death in the US vs media coverage. The percentage of media attention for terrorism (about 33–35%) is much greater than the percentage of deaths caused by terrorism (less than 0.01%).

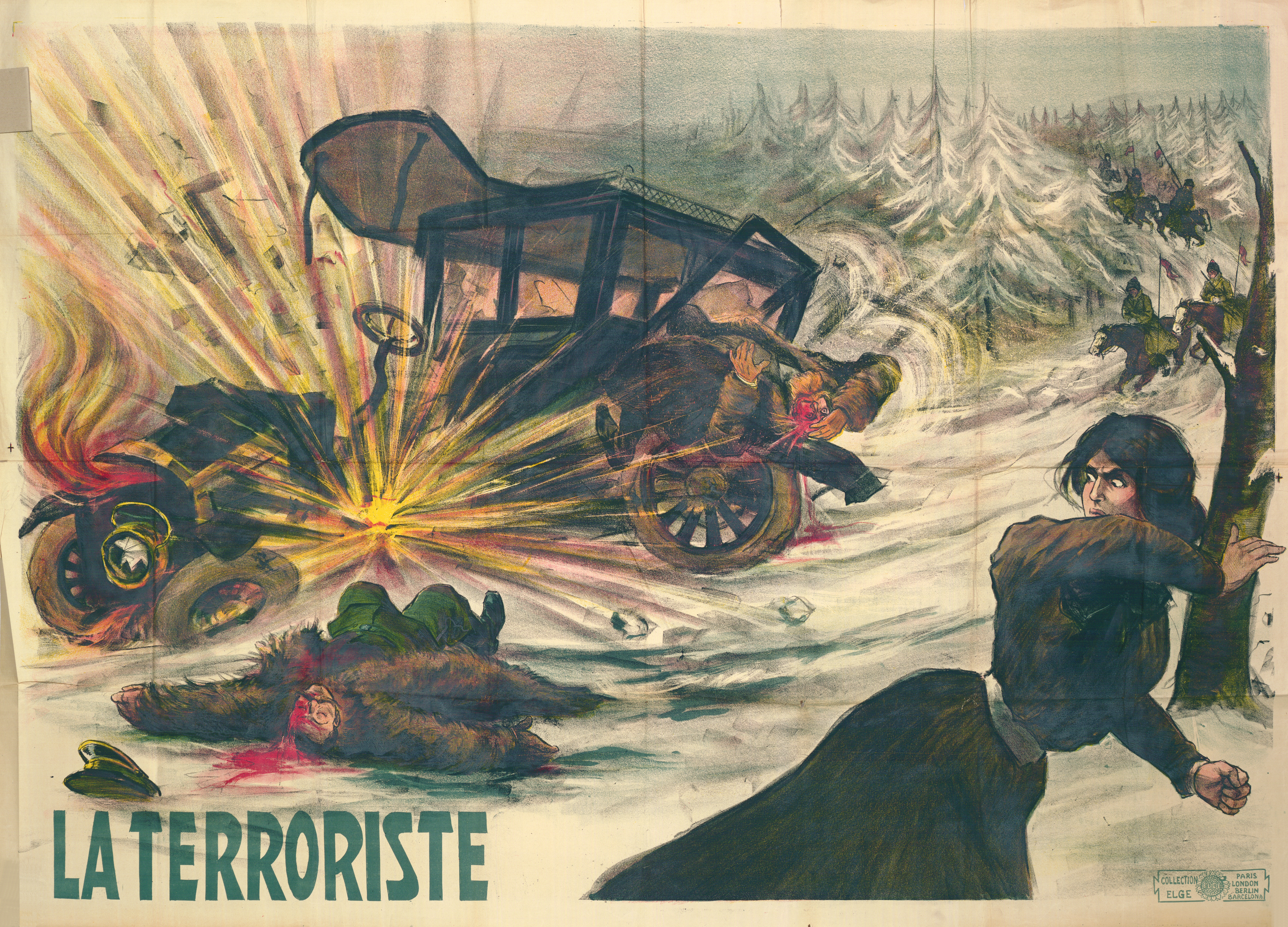
La Terroriste, a 1910 poster depicting a female member of the Combat Organization of the Polish Socialist Party throwing a bomb at a Russian official's car

Mass media exposure may be a primary goal of those carrying out terrorism, to expose issues that would otherwise be ignored by the media. Some consider this to be manipulation and exploitation of the media.

The Internet has created a new way for groups to spread their messages. This has created a cycle of measures and counter measures by groups in support of and in opposition to terrorist movements. The United Nations has created its own online counterterrorism resource.

The mass media will, on occasion, censor organizations involved in terrorism (through self-restraint or regulation) to discourage further terrorism. This may encourage organizations to perform more extreme acts of terrorism to be shown in the mass media. Conversely James F. Pastor explains the significant relationship between terrorism and the media, and the underlying benefit each receives from the other:

There is always a point at which the terrorist ceases to manipulate the media gestalt. A point at which the violence may well escalate, but beyond which the terrorist has become symptomatic of the media gestalt itself. Terrorism as we ordinarily understand it is innately media-related.

— Novelist William Gibson, 2004

Former British Prime Minister Margaret Thatcher famously spoke of the close connection between terrorism and the media, calling publicity 'the oxygen of terrorism'.

=== Terrorism and tourism ===
The connection between terrorism and tourism has been widely studied since the 1997 Luxor massacre, during which 62 people, including 58 foreign nationals, were killed by Islamist group Al-Jama'a Al-Islamiyya in an archaeological site in Egypt. In the 1970s, the targets of terrorists were politicians and chiefs of police while now, international tourists and visitors are selected as the main targets of attacks. The attacks on the World Trade Center and the Pentagon on September 11, 2001, were the symbolic center, which marked a new epoch in the use of civil transport against the main power of the planet. From this event onwards, the spaces of leisure that characterized the pride of the West were conceived as dangerous and frightful.

== Counterterrorism strategies ==
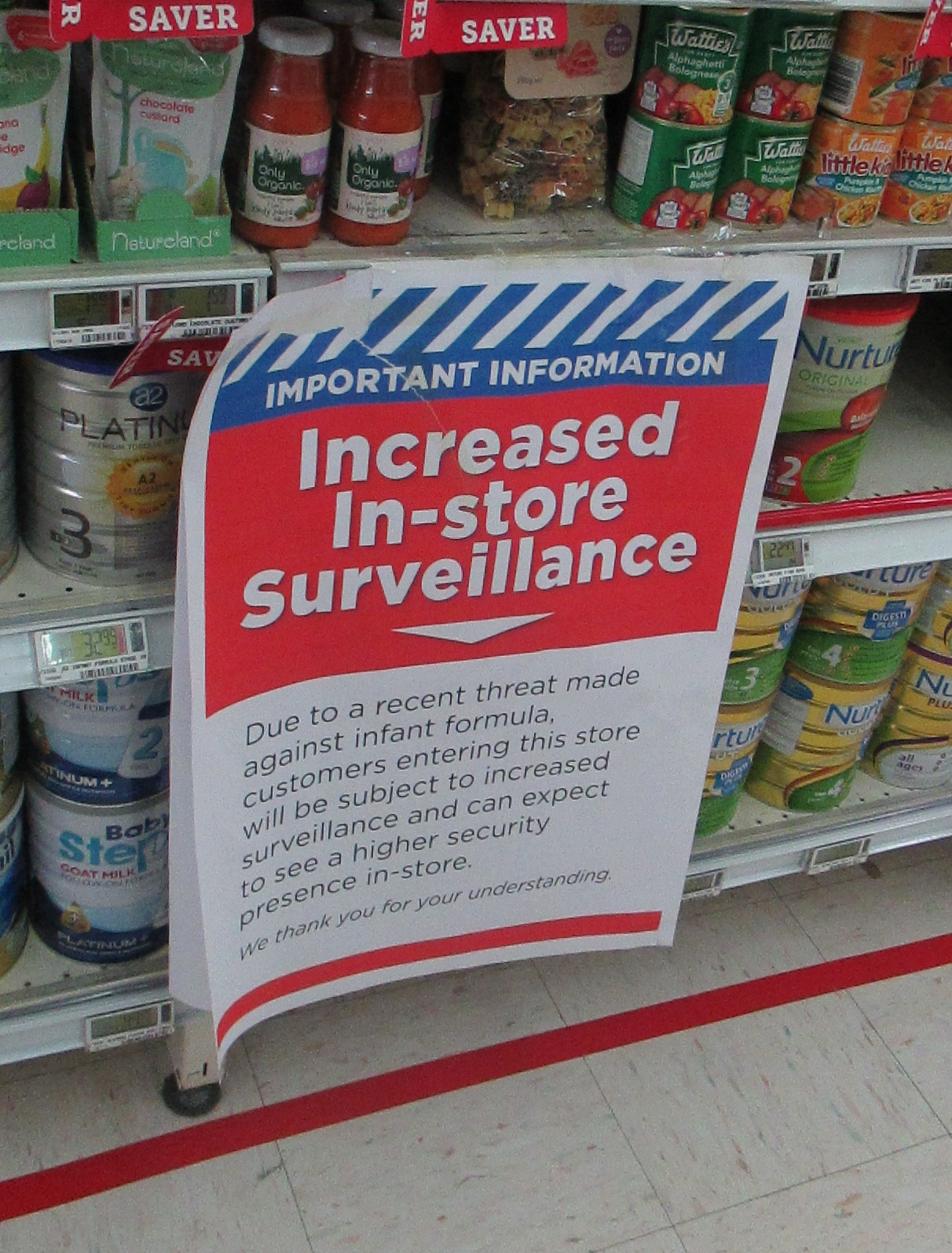
Sign notifying shoppers of increased surveillance due to a perceived increased risk of terrorism

Responses to terrorism are broad in scope. They can include re-alignments of the political spectrum and reassessments of fundamental values.

Specific types of responses include:

- Targeted laws, criminal procedures, deportations, and enhanced police powers
- Target hardening, such as locking doors or adding traffic barriers
- Preemptive or reactive military action
- Increased intelligence and surveillance activities
- Preemptive humanitarian activities
- More permissive interrogation and detention policies

=== Terrorism research ===
Terrorism research, also called terrorism studies, or terrorism and counter-terrorism research, is an academic field which seeks to understand the causes of terrorism, how to prevent it, as well as its impact in the broadest sense. Terrorism research can be carried out in both military and civilian contexts, for example by research centres such as the British Centre for the Study of Terrorism and Political Violence, the Norwegian Centre for Violence and Traumatic Stress Studies, and the International Centre for Counter-Terrorism (ICCT). There are several academic journals devoted to the field, including Perspectives on Terrorism.

=== International agreements ===
One of the agreements that promote the international legal counterterrorist framework is the Code of Conduct Towards Achieving a World Free of Terrorism that was adopted at the 73rd session of the United Nations General Assembly in 2018. The Code of Conduct was initiated by Kazakhstan President Nursultan Nazarbayev. Its main goal is to implement a wide range of international commitments to counterterrorism and establish a broad global coalition towards achieving a world free of terrorism by 2045. The Code was signed by more than 70 countries.

=== Response in the United States ===
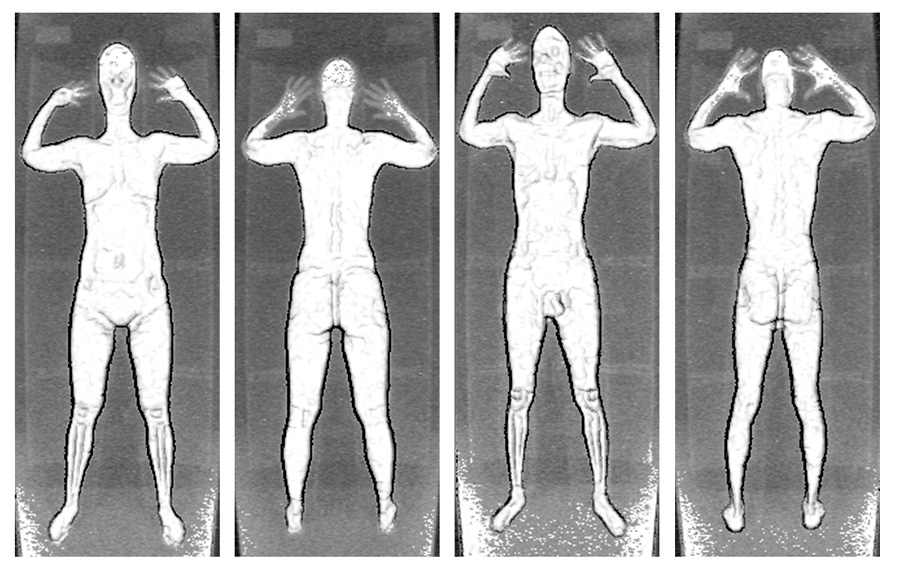
X-ray backscatter technology (AIT) machine used by the Transportation Security Administration (TSA) to screen passengers. According to the TSA, this is what the remote TSA agent would see on their screen.

According to a report by Dana Priest and William M. Arkin in The Washington Post, "Some 1,271 government organizations and 1,931 private companies work on programs related to counterterrorism, homeland security and intelligence in about 10,000 locations across the United States."

America's thinking on how to defeat radical Islamists is split along two very different schools of thought. Republicans typically follow what is known as the Bush Doctrine, which advocates the military model of taking the fight to the enemy and seeking to democratize the Middle East. Democrats, by contrast, generally propose the law enforcement model of better cooperation with nations and more security at home. In the introduction of the U.S. Army / Marine Corps Counterinsurgency Field Manual, Sarah Sewall states the need for "U.S. forces to make securing the civilian, rather than destroying the enemy, their top priority. The civilian population is the center of gravity—the deciding factor in the struggle.... Civilian deaths create an extended family of enemies—new insurgent recruits or informants—and erode support of the host nation." Sewall sums up the book's key points on how to win this battle: "Sometimes, the more you protect your force, the less secure you may be.... Sometimes, the more force is used, the less effective it is.... The more successful the counterinsurgency is, the less force can be used and the more risk must be accepted.... Sometimes, doing nothing is the best reaction." This strategy, often termed "courageous restraint", has certainly led to some success on the Middle East battlefield. However, it does not address the fact that terrorists are mostly homegrown.

=== Ending terrorist groups ===
How terrorist groups end (n = 268): The most common ending for a terrorist group is to convert to nonviolence via negotiations (43%), with most of the rest terminated by routine policing (40%). Groups that were ended by military force constituted only 7%.

Jones and Libicki (2008) created a list of all the terrorist groups they could find that were active between 1968 and 2006. They found 648. Of those, 136 splintered and 244 were still active in 2006. Of the ones that ended, 43% converted to nonviolent political actions, like the Irish Republican Army in Northern Ireland; 40% were defeated by law enforcement; 7% (20 groups) were defeated by military force; and 10% succeeded.

42 groups became large enough to be labeled an insurgency; 38 of those had ended by 2006. Of those, 47% converted to nonviolent political actors. Only 5% were ended by law enforcement, and 21% were defeated by military force. 26% won. Jones and Libicki concluded that military force may be necessary to deal with large insurgencies but are only occasionally decisive, because the military is too often seen as a bigger threat to civilians than the terrorists. To avoid that, the rules of engagement must be conscious of collateral damage and work to minimize it. When militant groups face violent competition from other groups, they often shift from high-profile attacks on civilians to more restrained tactics, a strategy of terrorist restraint that arises due to resource constraints and fear of civilian backlash.

In her book, How Terrorism Ends (2009), Audrey Kurth Cronin, lists six primary ways that terrorist groups end:

1. Capture or killing of a group's leader (Decapitation)
2. Entry of the group into a legitimate political process (Negotiation)
3. Achievement of group aims (Success)
4. Group implosion or loss of public support (Failure)
5. Defeat and elimination through brute force (Repression)
6. Transition from terrorism into other forms of violence (Reorientation)

== State and state sponsored-terrorism ==
=== State terrorism ===
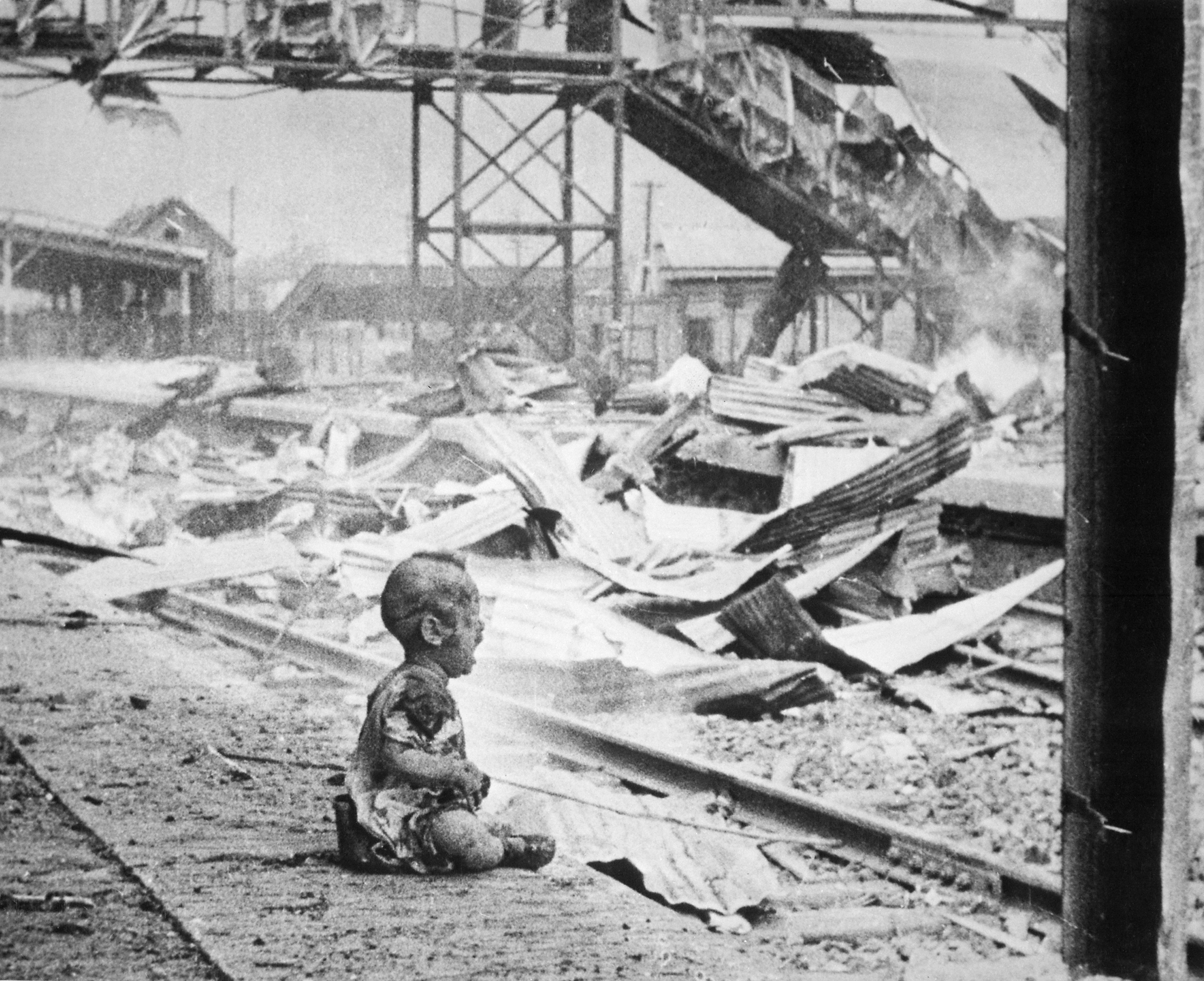
Infant crying in Shanghai's South Station after the Japanese bombing, August 28, 1937

As with "terrorism" the concept of "state terrorism" is controversial. The Chairman of the United Nations Counter-Terrorism Committee has stated that the committee was conscious of 12 international conventions on the subject, and none of them referred to state terrorism, which was not an international legal concept. If states abused their power, they should be judged against international conventions dealing with war crimes, international human rights law, and international humanitarian law. Former United Nations Secretary-General Kofi Annan has said that it is "time to set aside debates on so-called 'state terrorism'. The use of force by states is already thoroughly regulated under international law". He made clear that, "regardless of the differences between governments on the question of the definition of terrorism, what is clear and what we can all agree on is that any deliberate attack on innocent civilians [or non-combatants], regardless of one's cause, is unacceptable and fits into the definition of terrorism."

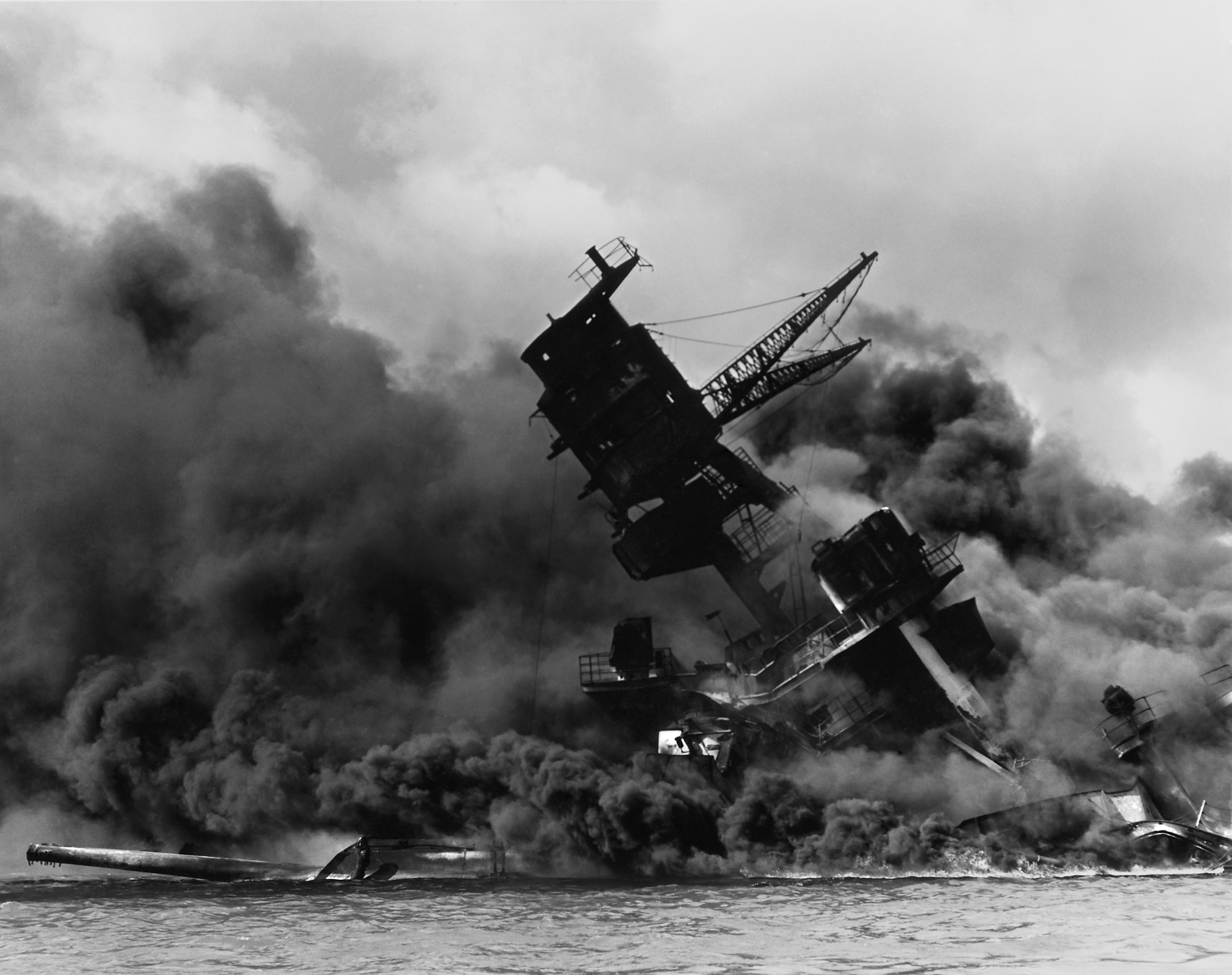
USS Arizona (BB-39) burning during the Japanese surprise attack on Pearl Harbor, December 7, 1941

State terrorism has been used to refer to terrorist acts committed by governmental agents or forces. This involves the use of state resources employed by a state's foreign policies, such as using its military to directly perform acts of terrorism. Professor of Political Science Michael Stohl cites the examples that include the German bombing of London, the Japanese surprise attack on Pearl Harbor, the Allied firebombing of Dresden, and the U.S. atomic bombings of Hiroshima and Nagasaki during World War II. He argues that "the use of terror tactics is common in international relations and the state has been and remains a more likely employer of terrorism within the international system than insurgents." He cites the first strike option as an example of the "terror of coercive diplomacy" as a form of this, which holds the world hostage with the implied threat of using nuclear weapons in "crisis management" and he argues that the institutionalized form of terrorism has occurred as a result of changes that took place following World War II. In this analysis, state terrorism exhibited as a form of foreign policy was shaped by the presence and use of weapons of mass destruction, and the legitimizing of such violent behavior led to an increasingly accepted form of this behavior by the state.

Charles Stewart Parnell described William Ewart Gladstone's Irish Coercion Act as terrorism in his "no-Rent manifesto" in 1881, during the Irish Land War. The concept is used to describe political repressions by governments against their own civilian populations with the purpose of inciting fear. For example, taking and executing civilian hostages or extrajudicial elimination campaigns are commonly considered "terror" or terrorism, for example during the Red Terror or the Great Terror. Such actions are often described as democide or genocide, which have been argued to be equivalent to state terrorism. Empirical studies on this have found that democracies have little democide. Western democracies, including the United States, have supported state terrorism and mass killings, with some examples being the Indonesian mass killings of 1965–66 and Operation Condor.

=== State-sponsored terrorism ===
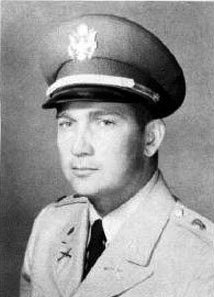
Luis Posada and CORU are widely considered responsible for the 1976 bombing of a Cuban airliner that killed 73 people.

A state can sponsor terrorism by funding or harboring a terrorist group. Opinions as to which acts of violence by states consist of state-sponsored terrorism vary widely. When states provide funding for groups considered by some to be terrorist, they rarely acknowledge them as such.

== Impact and debate ==
Terrorism is a charged term. It is often used with the connotation of something that is morally wrong. Governments and non-state groups use the term to abuse or denounce opposing groups. While legislation defining terrorism as a crime has been adopted in many states, the distinction between activism and terrorism remains a complex and debated matter. There is no consensus as to whether terrorism should be regarded as a war crime. State terrorism is that perpetrated by nation states, but is not considered such by the state conducting it, making legality a grey area. Countries sometimes opt to ignore terrorist activities committed by allies.

The use of the term in the Israeli–Palestinian conflict has given rise to controversies concerning the vagueness of how terrorists are defined and identified.

Media outlets who wish to convey impartiality may limit their usage of "terrorist" and "terrorism" because they are loosely defined, potentially controversial in nature, and subjective terms.

=== Pejorative use ===
The term "terrorism" is often used to abuse or denounce opposite parties, either governments or non-state groups. An example of this is the terruqueo political attack used by right-wing groups in Peru to target leftist groups or those opposed to the neoliberal status quo, likening opponents to guerrilla organizations from the internal conflict in Peru.

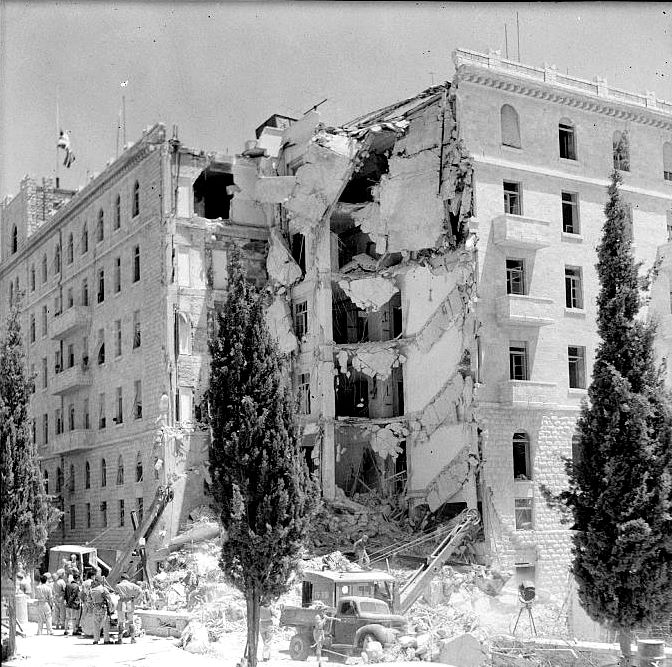
Aftermath of the King David Hotel bombing by the Zionist militant group Irgun, July 1946

Those labeled "terrorists" by their opponents rarely identify themselves as such, but it was not always so. While a multitude of terms like separatist, freedom fighter, liberator, revolutionary, vigilante, militant, paramilitary, guerrilla, rebel, patriot, have come into use, (including some culturally specific terms borrowed from other languages like Jihadi, mujahideen, and fedayeen), the unwillingness to self-identify as terrorists began when parties in a conflict started to describe each other as terrorists pejoratively. As an example, when Vera Zasulich attacked a Russian official known for abusing prisoners she told the court "I am not a criminal, I am a terrorist!". The stunned court acquitted Zazulich when they realized that she was trying to become a martyr. She was carried out of the courtroom on the shoulders of the crowd.

Some groups and individuals have openly admitted to using "terrorist tactics" even while maintaining distance from the pejorative term in their self-descriptions. The Zionist militant group Lohamei Herut Yisrael admitted that they used terrorist tactics but used the euphemism "Freedom Fighters" to describe themselves (Lohamei Herut Yisrael means "Freedom Fighters for Israel".)

In his book Inside Terrorism Bruce Hoffman offered an explanation of why the term terrorism becomes distorted:

On one point, at least, everyone agrees: terrorism is a pejorative term. It is a word with intrinsically negative connotations that is generally applied to one's enemies and opponents, or to those with whom one disagrees and would otherwise prefer to ignore. 'What is called terrorism,' Brian Jenkins has written, 'thus seems to depend on one's point of view. Use of the term implies a moral judgment; and if one party can successfully attach the label terrorist to its opponent, then it has indirectly persuaded others to adopt its moral viewpoint.' Hence the decision to call someone or label some organization terrorist becomes almost unavoidably subjective, depending largely on whether one sympathizes with or opposes the person/group/cause concerned. If one identifies with the victim of the violence, for example, then the act is terrorism. If, however, one identifies with the perpetrator, the violent act is regarded in a more sympathetic, if not positive (or, at the worst, an ambivalent) light; and it is not terrorism.

The pejorative connotations of the word can be summed up in the aphorism, "One man's terrorist is another man's freedom fighter". This is exemplified when a group using irregular military methods is an ally of a state against a mutual enemy, but later falls out with the state and starts to use those methods against its former ally.

Groups accused of terrorism understandably prefer terms reflecting legitimate military or ideological action. Leading terrorism researcher Professor Martin Rudner, director of the Canadian Centre of Intelligence and Security Studies at Ottawa's Carleton University, defines "terrorist acts" as unlawful attacks for political or other ideological goals, and said:

There is the famous statement: 'One man's terrorist is another man's freedom fighter.' But that is grossly misleading. It assesses the validity of the cause when terrorism is an act. One can have a perfectly beautiful cause and yet if one commits terrorist acts, it is terrorism regardless.

Labelling opponents as "terrorists" has been used as a tactic to evade the usual laws of war against things such as assassinations and other extrajudicial killing, particularly by Israel and the United States. Some international legal opinions suggest that terrorist activities by their very nature "deny" the civilian nature of an ostensibly civilian participant.

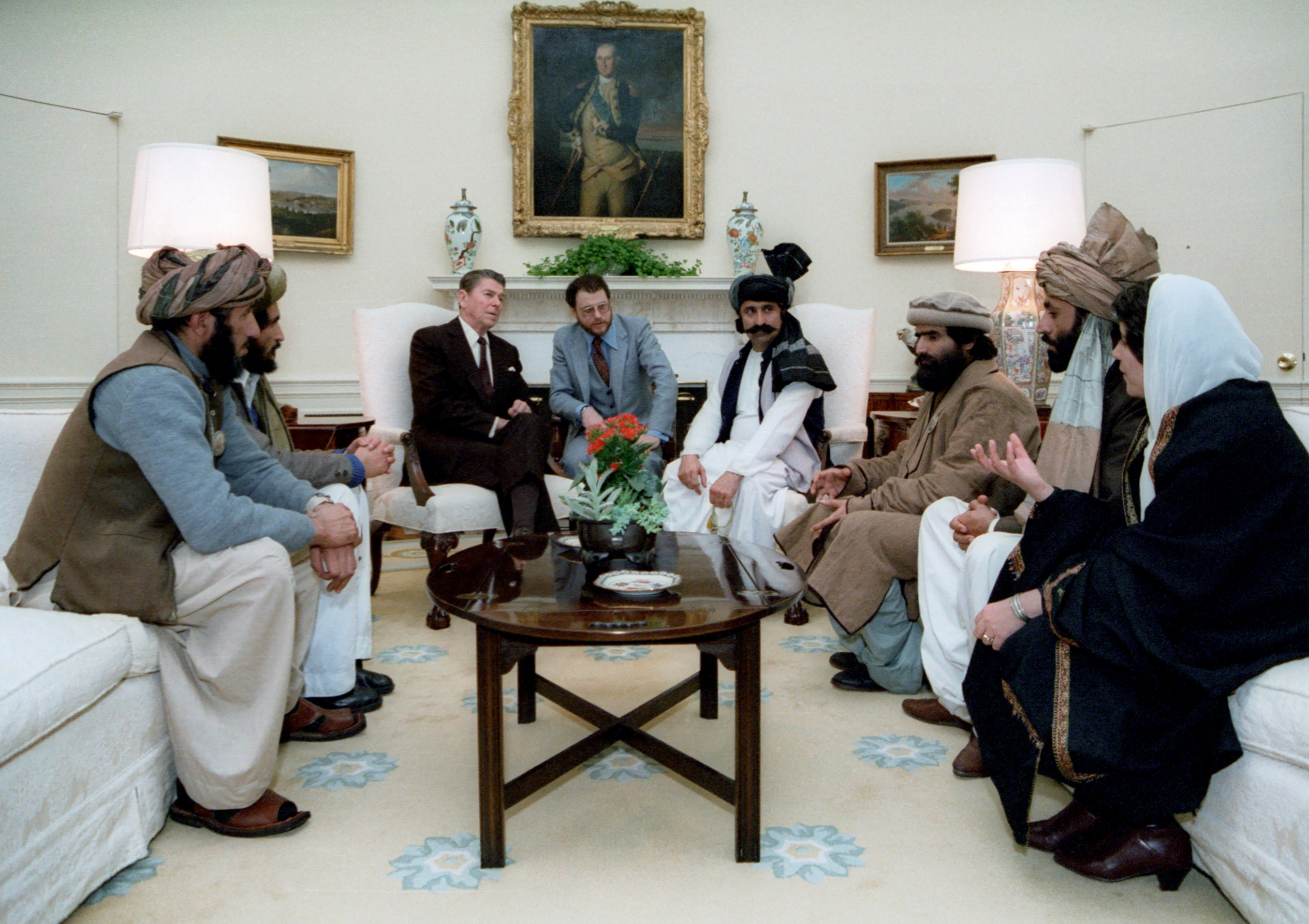
President Reagan meeting with Afghan Mujahideen leaders in the Oval Office in 1983

Some groups, when involved in a "liberation" struggle, have been called "terrorists" by the Western governments or media. Later, these same persons, as leaders of the liberated nations, are called "statesmen" by similar organizations. Two examples of this phenomenon are the Nobel Peace Prize laureates Menachem Begin and Nelson Mandela. WikiLeaks editor Julian Assange has been called a "terrorist" by Sarah Palin and Joe Biden.

Inversely, some groups like the Afghan Mujahideen that were labelled as "freedom fighters" later became "terrorists" as alliances shifted. During the Second World War, the Malayan People's Anti-Japanese Army were allied with the British, but during the Malayan Emergency, members of its successor organisation (the Malayan National Liberation Army) started campaigns against them, and were branded "terrorists" as a result.

== Databases ==
The following terrorism databases are or were made publicly available for research purposes, and track specific acts of terrorism:

- Global Terrorism Database, an open-source database by the University of Maryland, College Park on terrorist events around the world from 1970 through 2017 with more than 150,000 cases.
- MIPT Terrorism Knowledge Base
- Worldwide Incidents Tracking System
- Tocsearch (dynamic database)

The following public report and index provides a summary of key global trends and patterns in terrorism around the world:

- Global Terrorism Index, produced annually by the Institute for Economics and Peace

The following publicly available resources index electronic and bibliographic resources on the subject of terrorism:

- Human Security Gateway

The following terrorism databases are maintained in secrecy by the United States Government for intelligence and counterterrorism purposes:

- Terrorist Identities Datamart Environment
- Terrorist Screening Database

Jones and Libicki (2008) includes a table of 268 terrorist groups active between 1968 and 2006 with their status as of 2006: still active, splintered, converted to nonviolence, removed by law enforcement or military, or won. (These data are not in a convenient machine-readable format but are available.)

== Infographics ==
Terrorist incidents, 1970–2015. A total of 157,520 incidents are plotted. Orange: 1970–1999, Red: 2000–2015

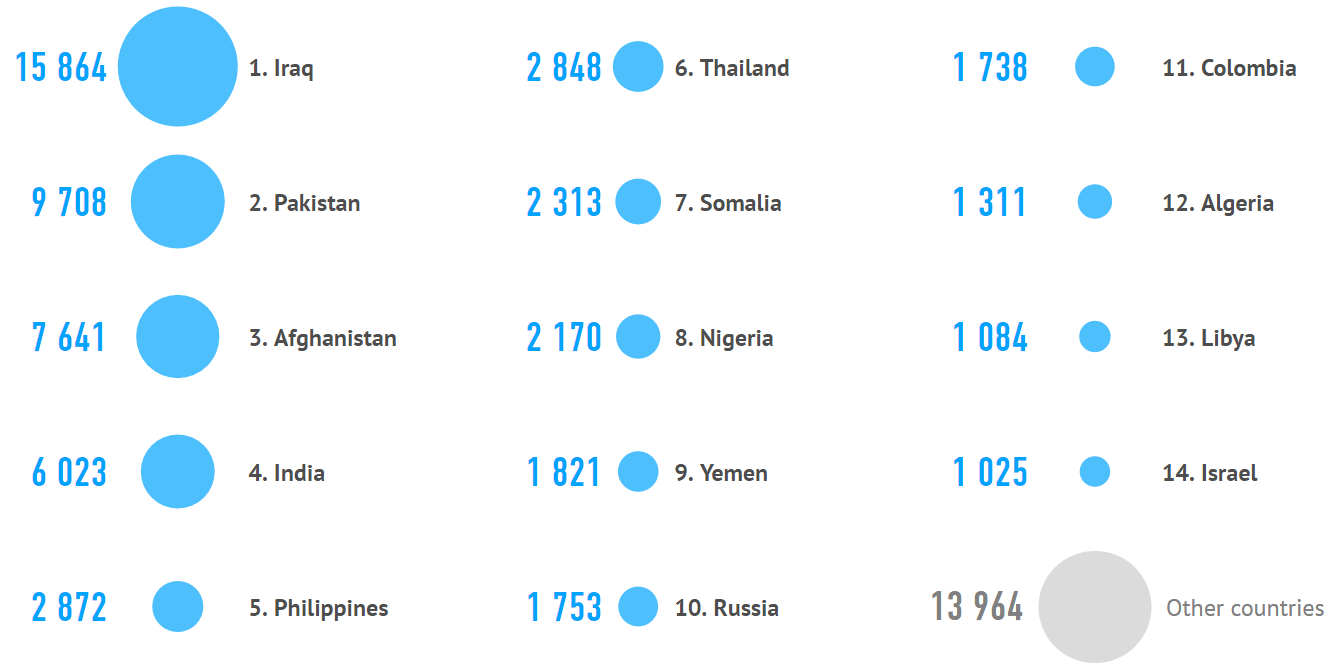
Top 10 Countries (2000–2014)

Worldwide non-state terrorist incidents 1970–2017

Share who are worried about vs. share of deaths from terrorism

== See also ==
- Agro-terrorism
- Communist terrorism
- Crimes against humanity
- Cyberterrorism
- Definitions of terrorism
- Economic terrorism
- Economics of terrorism
- Environmental terrorism
- Fearmongering
- Government negotiation with terrorists
- Left-wing terrorism
- Right-wing terrorism
- List of designated terrorist groups
- List of terrorist incidents
- Mass shooting
- Narcoterrorism
- Nationalist terrorism
- Nuclear terrorism
  - Global Initiative to Combat Nuclear Terrorism
- Religious terrorism
  - Hindutva terrorism
  - Islamic terrorism
  - Christian terrorism
  - Jewish religious terrorism
- Stochastic terrorism
- Terrorism and social media
- Royal Order of Civil Recognition to Victims of Terrorism

== Bibliography ==
- Bouhey, Vivien (2009), Les Anarchistes contre la République [The Anarchists against the Republic], Rennes: Presses universitaires de Rennes (PUR)
- Chalk, Peter (2013). Encyclopedia of Terrorism. ABC-CLIO.
- Dietze, Carola; Verhoeven, Claudia (2022). The Oxford Handbook of the History of Terrorism. Oxford University Press.
- Ferragu, Gilles (2019), "L'écho des bombes: l'invention du terrorisme « à l'aveugle » (1893–1895)" [The echo of bombs: The invention of indiscriminate terrorism (1893–1895)], Ethnologie française, 49 (1): 21–31, doi:10.3917/ethn.191.0021
- Hoffman, Bruce (1988). Inside Terrorism. New York: Columbia University Press.
- Hoffman, Bruce (1998). "Inside Terrorism". Columbia University Press. p. 32. ISBN 0-231-11468-0.
  - Hoffman, Bruce (1998a). "Chapter One". Inside Terrorism – via The New York Times.
- Hoffman, Bruce (2006). Inside Terrorism (2nd ed.). Columbia University Press.
- Laqueur, Walter (2001). A History of Terrorism. Taylor & Francis.
- Perspectives on Terrorism's Bibliography: Root Causes of Terrorism. 2017.
- Primoratz, Igor (2004). Terrorism: The Philosophical Issues. Palgrave Macmillan.
- Salomé, Karine (2011), L'Ouragan homicide: L'attentat politique en France au XIXe siècle [The homicidal Hurricane: political assassination in 19th century France], Paris: Champ Vallon / Epoque, ISBN 978-2-87673-538-5
- Spaaij, Ramon (2012). Understanding Lone Wolf Terrorism: Global Patterns, Motivations and Prevention.
- Wilkinson, Paul (1977). Terrorism and the Liberal State. Macmillan.
