= Anonymous terrorism =

Anonymous terrorism refers to terrorist attacks (acts using intentional violence to achieve political aims) that no group or person has claimed responsibility for, nor been publicly claimed responsible by investigative authorities. It has constituted about 60-80% of terrorist attacks in the world between 1998 and 2016. This proportion has been called "surprisingly high" and is in conflict with the conventional wisdom that terrorists "mount an operation to call attention to their grievances" and to "the costs of ignoring" those grievances, which can't happen if the perpetrators don't make public the "cost", i.e. announce that an event of killing and/or destruction was their work. A number of theories have been advanced as to why terror groups sometimes don't claim an attack, including: a motivation not to force concessions from the enemy, but to punish or destroy them, by killing and demoralizing them; an interest in plausible deniability; avoiding retaliation; and a byproduct of a disconnect between terror leadership and operatives.

== Background and benefits ==
According to the Global Terrorism Database (GTD), between 1998 and 2016, "it appears that only 16.0% of terrorist attacks ... were claimed" by their perpetrators. Another 26.8% of attacks were "attributed", (i.e. attributed to a specific terrorist group by authorities after investigation), meaning that "fewer than half" of all terrorist attacks were either "claimed by their perpetrators or convincingly attributed". According to Erin Kearns, "claiming is easy". Putting out a claim seldom involves danger to the claimer. Among the potential benefits of claiming are that it "allows the group to signal to their adversaries or to otherwise send a message that could help them achieve a goal". It projects "reach and power". Claiming also "generates attention and publicity" to the cause, and prevents other terrorists "from free-riding by taking credit" for the claimers attack. Claims are not necessarily true — at least "a small proportion" are credibly considered false — Islamic State of Iraq and the Levant (ISIS) is thought to have claimed responsibility for attacks where it was "not directly involved" in the "planning or execution".

== Studies and arguments ==
Aftan Snyder points out that sometimes "violence itself" achieves the terrorist's goal particularly were the goal is to instill fear or simply to punish. Killing voters waiting to cast ballots in Iraq, or girls going to school in Afghanistan requires no announcement to connect the attack with the attacker's goal.

Both Snyder and Joshua Keating point out that the ideology of the terrorist group is a factor in the likelihood of claiming, with extremist religious groups (such as Islamist groups) often more interested punishing or destroying the enemy than in winning concessions (such as "secession, autonomy or further representation") from them. Concession winning is more likely to be the goal of nationalist/Marxist/separatist groups, and a goal for which claiming credit is much more useful.

Furthermore, "the psychological effect of not knowing the 'who' or 'why' behind an attack" and that there are more to come, can demoralize an enemy population. The "inability to identify the terrorist group makes the government look inept and impotent" and undermines its legitimacy. Keeping silent after an attack gives the terrorist group "plausible deniability" to avoid retaliation or complicate their "relationship with a client state, potential donors or political allies".

Max Abrahms and Justin Conrad postulate that while the conventional wisdom holds that terrorists "mount an operation to call attention to their grievances and the costs of ignoring them," a disconnect between the leadership and lower-level operatives in insurgent groups whereby for security reasons the leadership must delegate responsibility for decision making on attacks to lower-level operatives who lack the experience and knowledge of the leaders. The leadership is aware of the strategic importance of concentrating attacks on the military and avoiding killing civilians (which will tend to enrage and energize the enemy forces and undermine any public support for the insurgents), and tries to pass this on to group members who actually do the killing, but the operatives often remain much less aware of this, but often more aware that attacks on "soft" civilian targets are much less difficult and dangerous. They may also hope to gain (less strategic) satisfaction from operations, such as prestige within the organization. Thus operative who chose and execute the attacks will often tend to favor civilian targets, while those who issue communiques and hoped to take credit and justifying the attacks, aware of the potential for backlash, will remain silent.

Analyzing of "transnational terrorism events" in Israel or associated with it between 1968 and 2004, Aaron M Hoffman asserts that fear of retaliation discourages terrorists from "credit taking" for attacks, but this fear may be overcome in a "competitive" environment where there are a number of terrorist groups competing for attention and support. Anonymity may also deny security forces “a window into what perpetrators of terrorism want and the incentives that influence their behavior.”

A study by Erin Kearns of "102,914 attacks committed in 160 countries between 1998 and 2016", found that the attacks more likely to be "claimed" by a terrorist group were: suicide attacks, those with higher fatalities, and those done in "competitive environments". Eric Min (using "Global Terrorism Database and case studies of three extremist organizations in Pakistan") also found high rates of claim for attacks involving "high costs" (suicide and casualties), and "competitive environments", but also in "institutionally constrained states" (i.e. democracies with due process and rights of the accused).

== See also ==
- Terrorism
