= Paramilitary finances in the Troubles =

Finances in Northern Ireland (1969–1998)

In order to finance their armed campaigns during the Troubles (1969–1998), both Irish republican and Ulster loyalist paramilitaries engaged in numerous fundraising activities within Ireland and the United Kingdom, such as bank robbery, extortion, drug trafficking, bootleg recording, racketeering, and legitimate businesses such as social clubs, taxi companies, and retail shops. They also received finances from overseas, with the Republican paramilitaries being given the most support.

The overwhelming bulk of the revenue provided for the paramilitaries throughout the conflict came from criminal and legitimate activities across the Republic of Ireland, Northern Ireland, and Great Britain. These funds were used to purchase weapons overseas and parts to manufacture homemade firearms and explosives, pay their volunteers and families of imprisoned activists, and for political, public relations, and community activities. While overseas donations were generally appreciated, they were mostly small and did not really impact any tactical or political decisions on the paramilitaries.

== Businesses ==
=== Republican ===
The Provisional Irish Republican Army ran legitimate or semi-legitimate-owned businesses which included private security firms, the black taxi cabs in Belfast (one co-operative of over 300 taxis located on Falls Road was estimated to have had an annual income of about US$1 million. They also include at least two known hackney cab services in Dublin, construction firms, shops, restaurants, courier services, guest houses, cars and machinery, pubs which at one time or another have included two small pubs in Finglas, County Dublin, two in Coolock, also in Dublin with several more in the city centre, three in Letterkenny, County Donegal, three in Cork (including one Cork hotel), and more small pubs 'scattered about the country.

One IRA interviewee stated that starting in the 1970s:

Belfast ran itself for years on its [social] clubs. You know the clubs? They formed the clubs, earlier on they formed it and ... the car parks, you know, not building them but taking over areas and running them as car parks. There was no one to say how much you took in and how much you took out and so, you know, if there was twenty-thousand coming in every week you could say there's twelve-thousand coming in and then there's eight-thousand going one way, and you paid your people and say there's so much going every week. And that financed the movement.

By 1978, after brothels and massage parlours had multiplied tenfold, the paramilitary groups saw their potential as sources of revenue. The Provisional IRA had begun to use the earnings from some establishments to buy arms and explosives. Paramilitary-run pubs were established in the wake of civil disorder across Northern Ireland, initially functioning to provide safe areas for local communities to congregate. Over 20 Republican-controlled drinking clubs soon evolved into major fund-raising fronts, with clubs like “The Felons” allegedly handing over a large proportion of the profits to PIRA. Whilst many of the IRA-run clubs became “legalized,” they nonetheless “all ran two sets of books”’ to obscure the diversion of funds to IRA-affiliated organizations, as well as to hide the extent of their illicit profiteering.

British professors Isabel Woodford and M.L.R. Smith estimated that £1,444,000 per year came from IRA-run associated clubs in the 1970s. In March 1997, The Irish Times reported that "IRA has acquired the services of senior professional figures, including an accountant and banker, in Dublin to oversee the acquisition and running of up to 20 public houses and the laundering of money."

Black taxies were also significantly profitable for the IRA, including the Falls Road Black Taxis service, which attracted former IRA prisoners. The Sunday Times reported in 1995 that over £750,000 per year came from IRA black taxies. Neil Southern wrote that:

[B]lack taxis, which charged reasonable fares, were a significant source of income for the IRA. Drivers contributed a small amount of their weekly takings to 'the cause' and so were not shackled by an overly burdensome extortion racket. Taking a little from a large resource was a better strategy than demanding a lot from a resource pool which is smaller.

Military historian Margaret Sankey stated:

In 1972, British intelligence tracked a PIRA firebombing campaign against Belfast city buses, assuming that it was solely a terror tactic against the government and meant to unsettle the population and destroy infrastructure. It turned out that the PIRA had decided to buy into the taxi business, putting money "to work" via Sinn Féin's grants to entrepreneurs affiliated with the cause. Every step of operating the black cabs—renting the vehicle, fueling it, repairing it, and paying a tax on earnings—went into republican pockets, with the additional expectation that the cabs were on call to ferry people around anonymously and deliver crates of arms. The firebombs had also been to render the city's public transportation inoperable and drive passengers to the more expensive cabs, while taking $3 million a year out of the city's budget.

In 1976, a Northern Irish official wrote a detailed letter on a number of firms with strong paramilitary links. In a thinly veiled reference to a well-known West Belfast taxi firm, he wrote it was "managed by men with strong Provisional IRA/Provisional Sinn Féin connections. Since it was formed by detainees from within the Maze, it seems reasonable to assume that most at least of its 200-plus members share their views. It is generally regarded as a PIRA/PSF business." He also said that "It is reported to pay 20 per cent of its profits to PIRA and has a leading member of the PIRA in Londonderry on its board."

=== Loyalist ===
Drinking clubs were also the main sources of funds for the Loyalists. Initially, the main difference between a drinking club and a pub was that it was more difficult to obtain a license for pubs and so drinking clubs were less regulated. On the other hand, pub owners did not have to provide the Royal Ulster Constabulary with a copy of their bank accounts/transactions. Anti-racketeering officers estimated that, in 1990, more than £100,000 went missing from one club in Belfast alone, siphoned off in support of terrorist criminal activity. During the early 1990s, regulations and oversight were tightened and the government closed a great number of clubs. These new regulations and controls had a serious impact on the funding of the Loyalists, and the Loyalists were forced into other avenues to fund their activity.

Loyalists also operated security firms as well. These companies were legally established and they operated by protecting businesses, estates, and so forth. Incidentally, the business owner could claim the money paid for security as a tax allowance (which essentially meant that the British government, through tax breaks, was indirectly funding the Loyalists). These security firms used harsh measures to protect their clients from common criminals. During the last half of the 1990s, these security firms executed some 1,400 reprisals in support of their clients. Because even the Royal Ulster Constabulary avoided some of the Loyalist areas, the only protection against criminals that was available for some was from the paramilitaries. One famous Ulster Democratic Party leader, James Craig, was the head of three such legal security companies.

Building firms were also valuable as do taxi companies. As violence increased in Northern Ireland, many abandoned public buses in favor of taxis. Loyalist and Republican paramilitaries controlled taxi companies, often for money laundering and as employment for their supporters. Like the Republicans, building firms were also seen as front organizations by Loyalists to create avenues of money. These companies might win contracts against regular companies because of lower costs and they didn't have to pay "protection money".

== Armed robbery ==
=== Republican ===
In 1973, the IRA formally began robberies. In December 1974, a team of IRA members carried out a robbery at the Chase Manhattan Bank, netting them approximately £140,000. On 31 March 1976, an IRA unit robbed the Cork-Dublin train at County Kildare of over £220.000 in an operation planned by the PIRA long in advance of the actual robbery, a raid that was even considered by the Irish National Liberation Army because of the nature of the potential reward. By the late 1970s, armed robberies in the Republic of Ireland were taking place almost every other day. In 1978, there were 237 armed robberies, with £837,000 stolen. The following year, nearly £2.25 million was taken in 250 armed robberies. The IRA was believed to be responsible for about half of the money being stolen.

A 1978 British Army report by Brigadier James Glover estimated the IRA's annual income at £950,000, of which £550,000 were from theft.

The trend continued into the 1980s, including sizable bank robberies in Killarney in County Kerry, and New Ross in County Wexford in April and June 1980 respectively. In New Ross, bank employees and patrons were padlocked into the building as the perpetrators made their escape. Following a County Waterford robbery in 1982, the IRA unit escaped by boat across the River Suir, avoiding garda roadblocks on bridges. Much of the money went into the purchase of arms.

The Northern Ireland Office report of 26 March 1983 stated: "Between 1971 and 1982 over £7 million was stolen in armed robberies in Northern Ireland, the largest proportion being taken by the Provisionals. In the Irish Republic, it is estimated that the Provisional IRA takes some 50 percent of £400,000 of the cash stolen each year." In March 1997, The Irish Times reported that "£60,000 stolen in armed robberies was surrendered to this [IRA head accountant] man at the beginning of the 1994 ceasefire."

=== Loyalist ===
Unlike the IRA, armed robberies committed by loyalist paramilitaries were largely restricted within Northern Ireland. In July 1987, the Ulster Volunteer Force (UVF) stole £250,000 from a Northern Bank in Portadown. The money was used to fund a weapons shipment from the South African apartheid regime, in which the British government largely assisted. In 1996, the Ulster Defence Association (UDA) carried out a well-planned and executed robbery. It began in the home of the security company's driver, where his family were handcuffed and gagged. The actual robbery occurred when armed and masked men outside Lisburn stopped the van, and a million pounds in used banknotes were seized by the UDA. It was one of the biggest attacks on a money transport.

== Kidnapping ==
=== Republican ===
Kidnapping, while a very risky task, was also a prominent source of funds. In 1972, Allied Irish Banks paid out £5,000 to save the life of one of its staff who was "under sentence of death" for thwarting an IRA bank raid. In 1981, the IRA abducted Irish businessman Ben Dunne on a County Louth road and was held in an unknown location, most likely in the southern part of County Armagh, Northern Ireland. He was released six days later, with the Dunne family reportedly denying paying the ransom, although it was widely reported that the IRA received £700,000. A string of kidnappings of (Northern and Southern) bank managers and their families netted approximately £60,000 ($80,000) to £80,000 ($110,000) per event (no one knows how many such kidnappings occurred because banks often preferred to pay up and keep quiet).

On 24 November 1983, Quinnsworth executive Don Tidey was kidnapped outside his home in Rathfarnham, Dublin by the IRA. Irish security forces began a manhunt for the kidnappers, culminating in a shootout with the IRA, in which Irish soldier Patrick Kelly and Garda officer Gary Sheehan were killed. The killings created an uproar in the Republic of Ireland and the ransom was never officially paid. The IRA was forced to abandon kidnapping as a result.

== Racketeering, smuggling, and fraud ==
Racketeering, smuggling, and fraud also generated significant sources of income, with contraband ranging from pigs to tobacco. John Hermon, Chief Constable of the Royal Ulster Constabulary, stated in his annual report for 1983 that:

Republican and Loyalist paramilitary organisations have established a lucrative foothold in criminal racketeering which, if not eradicated, will become a pernicious feature of the social and economic life of our community.

=== Republican ===
Perhaps the most notorious operation is that of Thomas "Slab" Murphy, who earned his nickname from his habit of dropping cement blocks on peoples' legs. In the mid-1980s, Murphy led an active service unit along the border. For many years he served as a member of the IRA Northern Command. In 1970, Murphy constructed a barn that straddles the border with the Republic of Ireland. When the European Economic Community offered a subsidy to Irish farmers for every animal exported to the UK, Murphy brought livestock into the North by ferry, collected the subsidy, and then herded the animals into one end of his barn. The livestock then went through the structure to the South, whence Murphy again ferried the animals up North for the collection of the subsidy. As of 2005, Murphy's smuggling operations were believed to net IRA and Sinn Féin in the range of £20 million per year. For the most part, Republicans control this sector.

A 1978 British Army report by Brigadier James Glover estimated that of the IRA's annual income at £950,000, £250,000 came from racketeering.

In April 1984, two armed IRA members hijacked a lorry as it left the PJ Carroll cigarette factory on the outskirts of Dundalk, County Louth. The lorry was packed with cigarettes with an estimated market value of £250,000. The raiders brought the lorry to a side road where the cigarettes were transferred to a waiting vehicle. A former lorry driver was later charged six months later for providing the IRA with information leading to the hijacking.

=== Loyalist ===
Loyalist paramilitaries also engaged in racketeering in the conflict. In a November 18, 1996 interview with the Human Rights Watch, Jeff Maxwell of government-funded Base 2 charity – charged with verifying intimidation – stated that:

In loyalist areas, you take a loan from someone who is a member of a paramilitary organization. They are running the local shebeens [drinking clubs]. Social clubs, taxi drivers, and shops pay protection money. The depot pays the paramilitaries seven pounds per taxi on the road per week. It is organized crime. The loyalist side is directly involved in selling drugs. Both sides take cuts from people who operate in their areas.

Unlike Irish Republican groups, who saw drug activity as immoral, there was less hesitation among Loyalists. The Loyalist involvement began by taking a cut of the regular criminals' drug trade. Once the leadership discovered the volume of money and the low risk involved, they also took over more of the import and distribution. In 1991, the British government estimated that the Ulster Defense Association and the Ulster Volunteer Force made a million pounds from the drug business. During the 1990s it was estimated that the Loyalists controlled some 60 percent of the drugs in Northern Ireland. According to the U.S. Northern Ireland Threat Assessment for 2001, it was believed that half of the groups involved in drug dealing had paramilitary associations.

The Loyalists' involvement in the drug trade was seen as controversial in the Loyalist community and never supported. But for many, it was justified on the grounds it was a low risk compared to extortion and drinking clubs (the latter which attracted government attention) and in order to keep the cash flow going. The UVF was a significant actor in this trade even though its senior leadership was against it. It was also a major reason why the splinter groups of the Ulster Freedom Fighters and Loyalist Volunteer Force were established in 1996 in order to keep the drug trade going.

== Donations ==
=== Republican ===
Irish Republican militants also received considerable donations from groups, individuals and state actors outside Northern Ireland. From the 1970s to the early 1990s, Libyan dictator Muammar Gaddafi gave the IRA over $12.5 million in cash (the equivalent of roughly $40 million in 2021). The IRA also received at least $2 million from the Revolutionary Armed Forces of Colombia (FARC) in exchange for training them with bomb techniques, including shaped charges, propane bombs, landmines and the construction of mortars (see also the Colombia Three).

Irish Americans, Irish Canadians, Irish Australians, and Irish New Zealanders provided financial donations to Republican organisations, mostly the Provisionals. The financial backbone of the Provisional cause in America was the Irish Northern Aid Committee (NORAID), which was estimated to have raised $3.6 million between 1970 and 1991, ranging from supporting families of dead or imprisoned IRA members to lobbying and propaganda efforts. In Australia, officials estimated that by the 1990s, no more than A$20,000 were raised annually for the Provisionals. Canadian supporters raised money to secretly purchase weapons, notably detonators used for Canadian mining sites and smuggled to the IRA.

=== Loyalist ===
The Northern Ireland Affairs Select Committee report of June 2002 estimated that in 1992, Scottish support for the UVF and UDA was at £100,000 per year.

== Overview ==
Because of these methods, both Republican and Loyalist paramilitaries were largely well-funded and sophisticated in their methods, enough to buy enough firearms and explosives as well as other activities throughout the conflict. The sums involving donations from overseas were very small and paled in comparison to the sources generated within the British Isles, which provided the overwhelming bulk of revenue for both Republican and loyalist paramilitaries.

=== Republican ===
By 1978, Glover estimated the IRA's annual income at £950,000. By the 1980s, IRA's annual funding ranged from £2 million to £4 million. In April 1987, RUC chief constable John Hermon told government ministers at the Anglo-Irish Intergovernmental Conference that "[i]t costs the IRA £2-£3 million per year to maintain its activity. That amount is no problem to them and they have no shortage of money to purchase weapons." By 1994, it reached $7.5 million per year.

The Northern Ireland Affairs Select Committee report of June 2002 estimated the PIRA's running cost at £1.5 million per year against its estimated annual funding of £5-8 million. The same report also saw the INLA's running cost at £25-30,000 per year against its estimated annual funding of £500,000, and the Real Irish Republican Army (RIRA)'s running cost at £500,000 per year against its estimated annual funding of £5 million.

=== Loyalist ===
The Northern Ireland Affairs Select Committee report of June 2002 estimated the UVF's annual running costs at £1–2 million per year, against an annual fundraising capability of £1.5 million. The same report also estimated the UDA's annual running costs at £500,000 against an annual fundraising capability of £500,000-1 million.
