= Mosaic District =

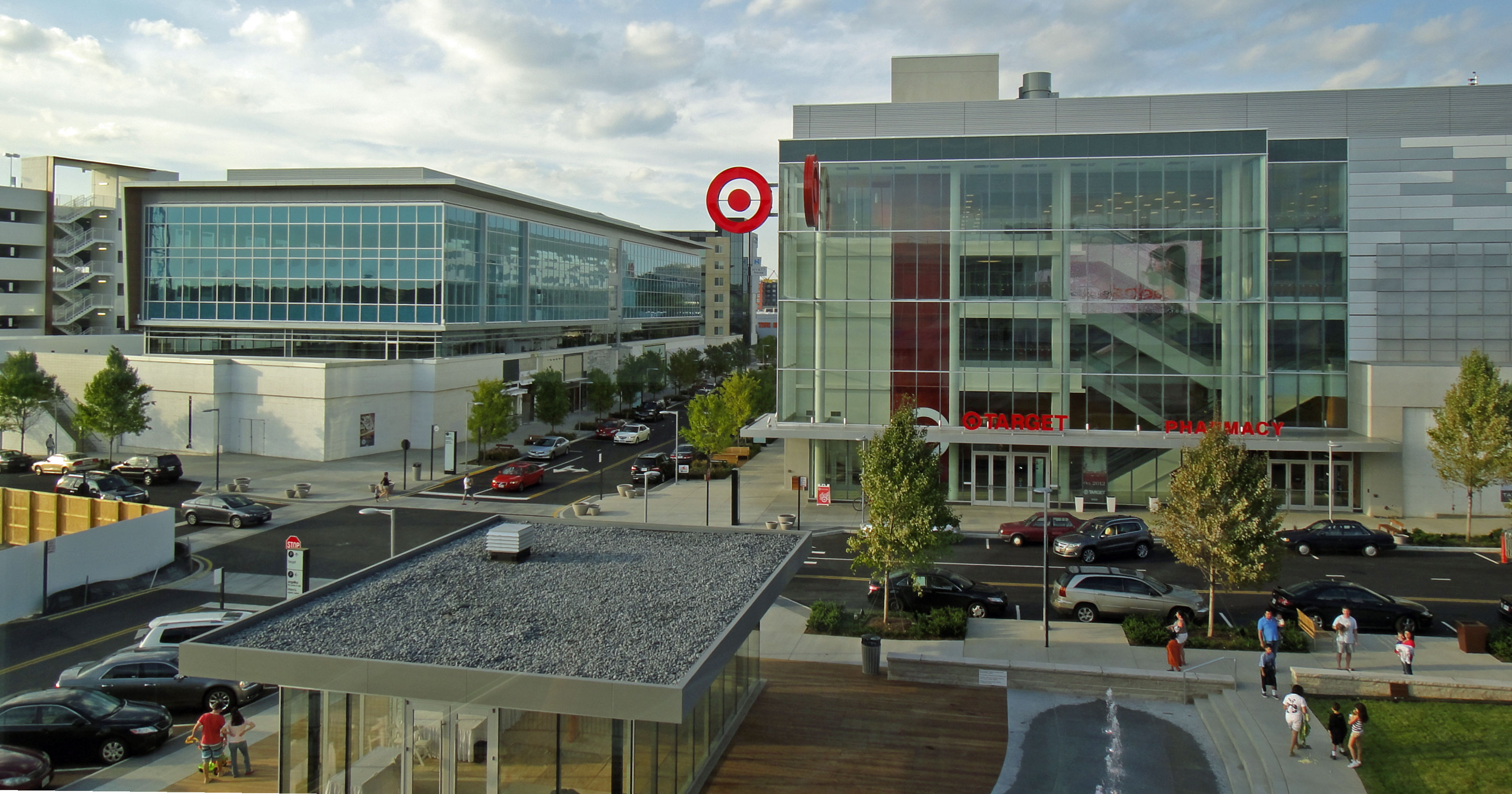
- Location: Merrifield, Virginia, U.S.
- Coordinates: 38.8708°N 77.2305°W
- Num. of anchor tenants: Target, West Elm, Barnes and Noble, Angelika Film Center, Archer Hotel
- Website: https://mosaicdistrict.com

The Mosaic District is a 31-acre (13 ha), 2,000,000 sq ft (190,000 m^{2}) mixed-use development built along urban-style streets (an ersatz downtown) in Merrifield, Fairfax, Virginia, in the Washington, D.C. suburbs between Fairfax and Falls Church. The district includes more than 1,100 apartment living spaces, 500,000 square feet (46,000 m^{2}) of office and retail space. Anchors include the Angelika Film Center arthouse cinema, Target hypermarket, West Elm (home furnishings), Barnes and Noble (book superstore) and Mom's Organic Market. In total there were 37 retail stores, 34 dining outlets and 27 service providers as of September 2026, plus the cinemas, 3 residential complexes, and the Archer hotel. It is a key example in Northern Virginia of retrofitting suburbs with more density. Its developer, Edens, states that it focused on providing third places and that it was inspired by Ray Oldenburg's 1989 book The Great Good Place.

Public spaces include the central park, interactive fountains and artworks such as a rainbow staircase, Pride crosswalk, and various murals.

== Murals ==
Murals include:

- parking garage mural collection
- Be United
- Muse Paintbar Balloons by Brian Wentworth
- Art at New Heights by Kelsey Montague
- Flower Power
- Create, Motivate and Inspire
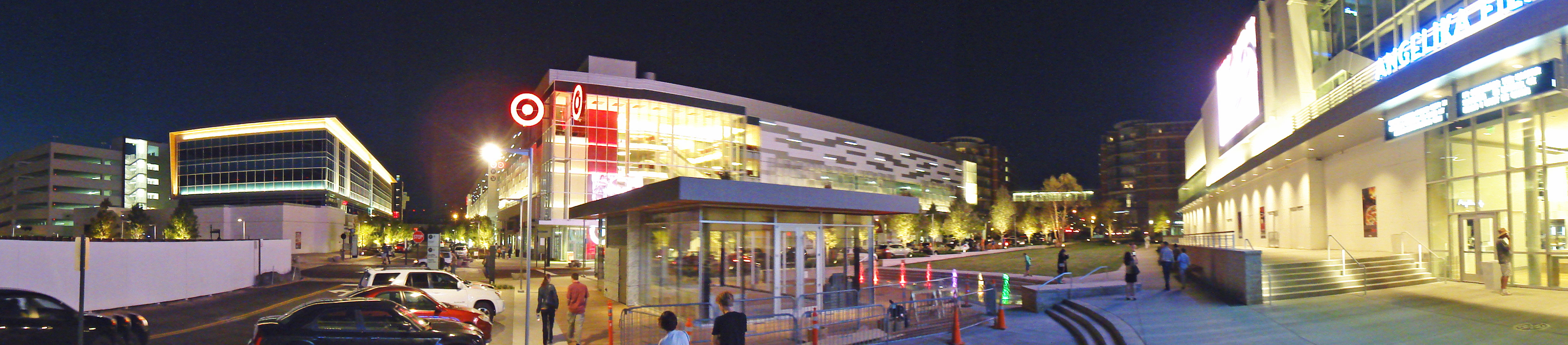
Panorama of Mosaic District at night

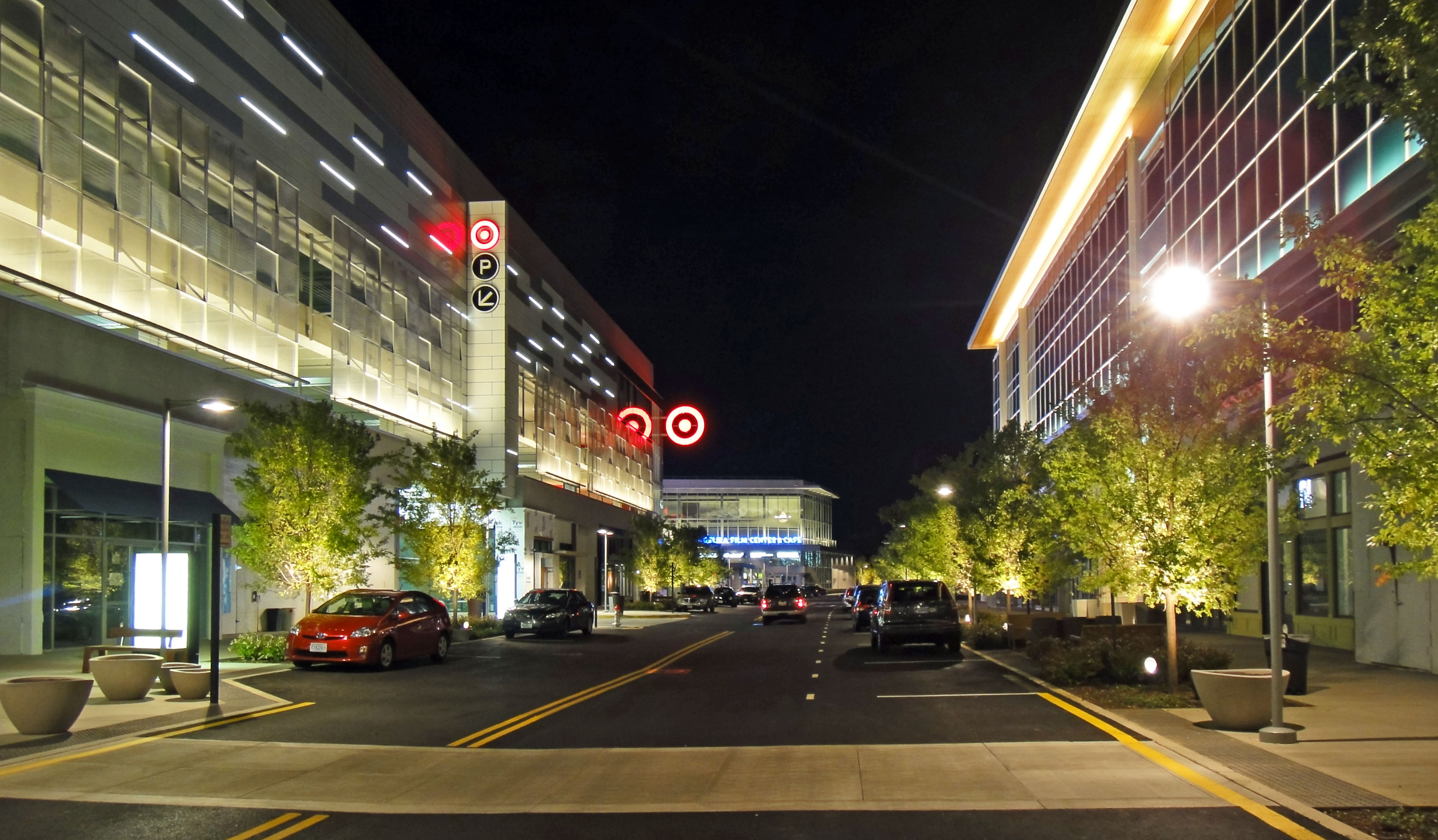
Mosaic District
