= Celebrating the Third Place =

2001 book by Ray Oldenburg

First edition

Celebrating The Third Place, subtitled: Inspiring Stories About The Great Good Places at the Heart of Our Communities, is a 2001 book by Ray Oldenburg. The book follows his 1989 book The Great Good Place which introduced the term "Third place" and is a collage of 19 essays which tell stories of active third places in the heart of communities.

== Notes ==
(New York: Marlowe & Company, 2001) ISBN 1-56924-612-2
