= Nightlife =

Entertainment occurring at night

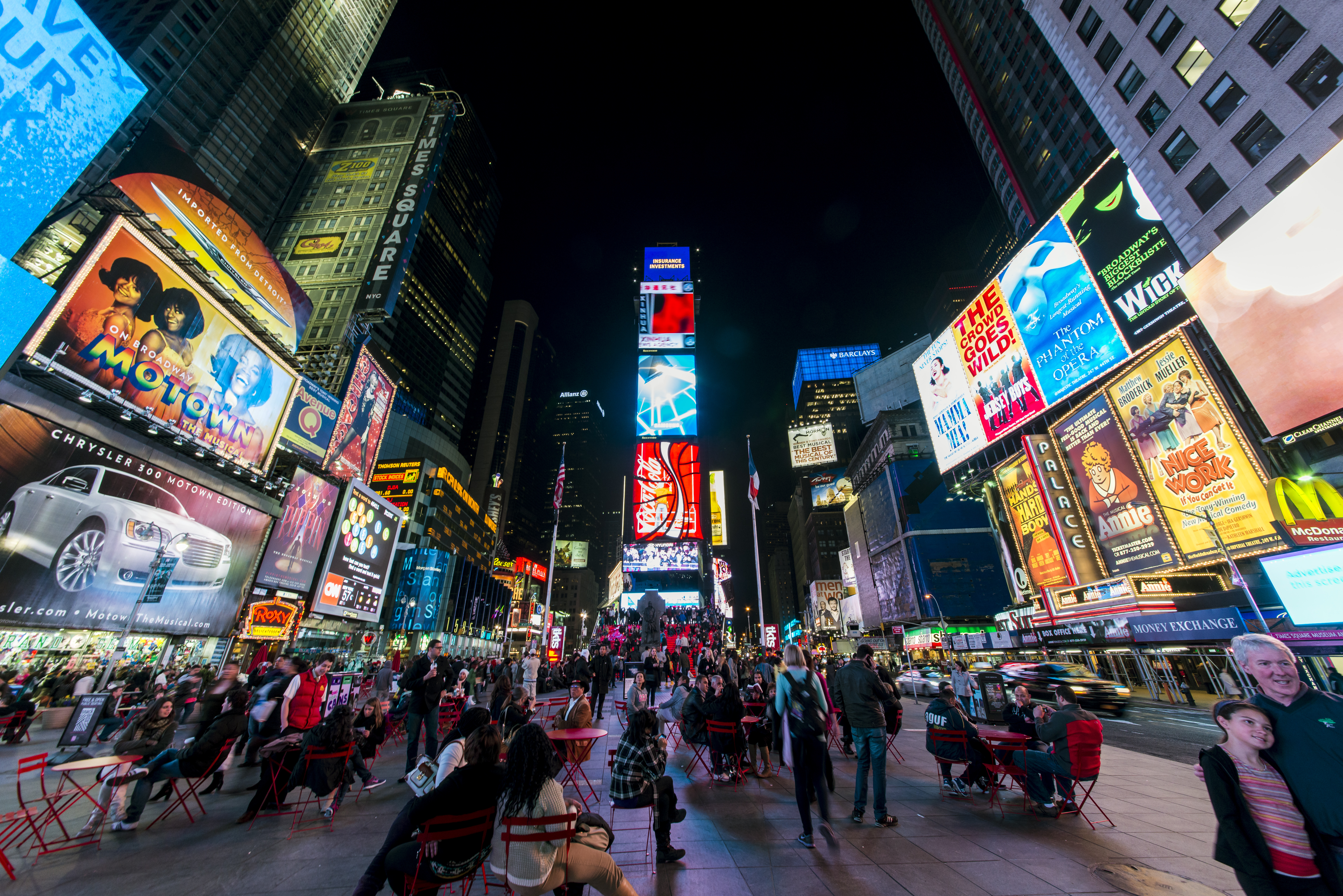
Nightlife in Times Square, Midtown Manhattan. One of the many nicknames for New York City is The City That Never Sleeps.

Cairo, Egypt, emerged as the most dynamic city of Africa for 2026.

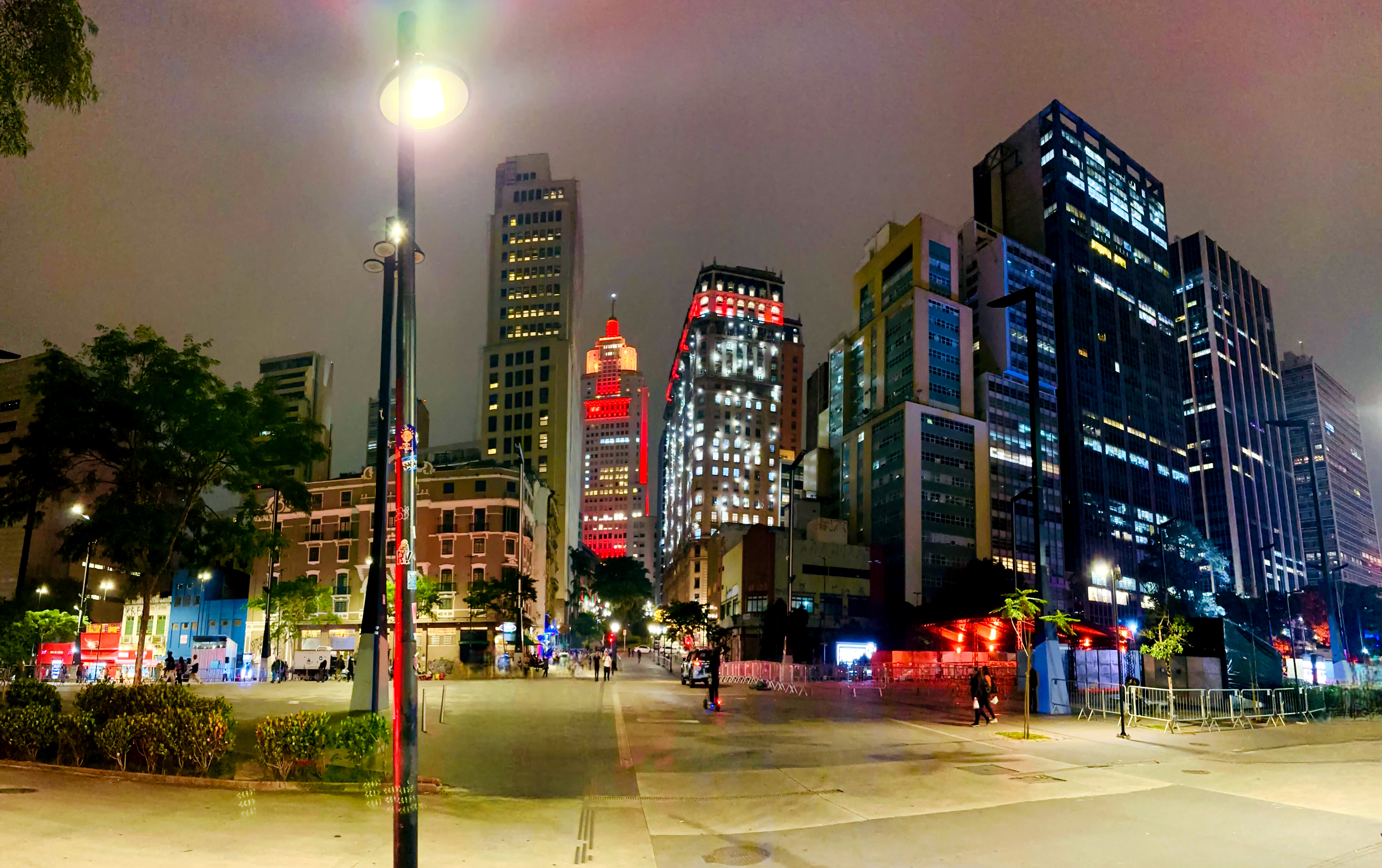
São Paulo, Brazil, has the best nightlife in the world, according to the World's Best Cities 2026.

Nightlife is a collective term for entertainment that is available and generally more popular from the late evening into the early hours of the morning. It includes pubs, bars, nightclubs, parties, live music, concerts, cabarets, theatre, cinemas, and shows. These venues often require a cover charge for admission. Nightlife entertainment is often more adult-oriented than daytime entertainment. People who prefer to be active during the night-time are called night owls.

== History ==
The lack of electric lighting, as well as the needs for agricultural labor, made staying up after dark difficult for most people. Larger ancient cities, such as Rome, had a reputation for danger at night. This changed in 17th and 18th-century Europe (and subsequently spread beyond) due to the development and implementation of artificial lighting: more domestic lights, added street lighting, and adaptation by the royal and upper social classes. The introduction of chocolate, coffee and tea, and cafes that stayed open through dawn, became part of the new culture.

== Sociological research ==
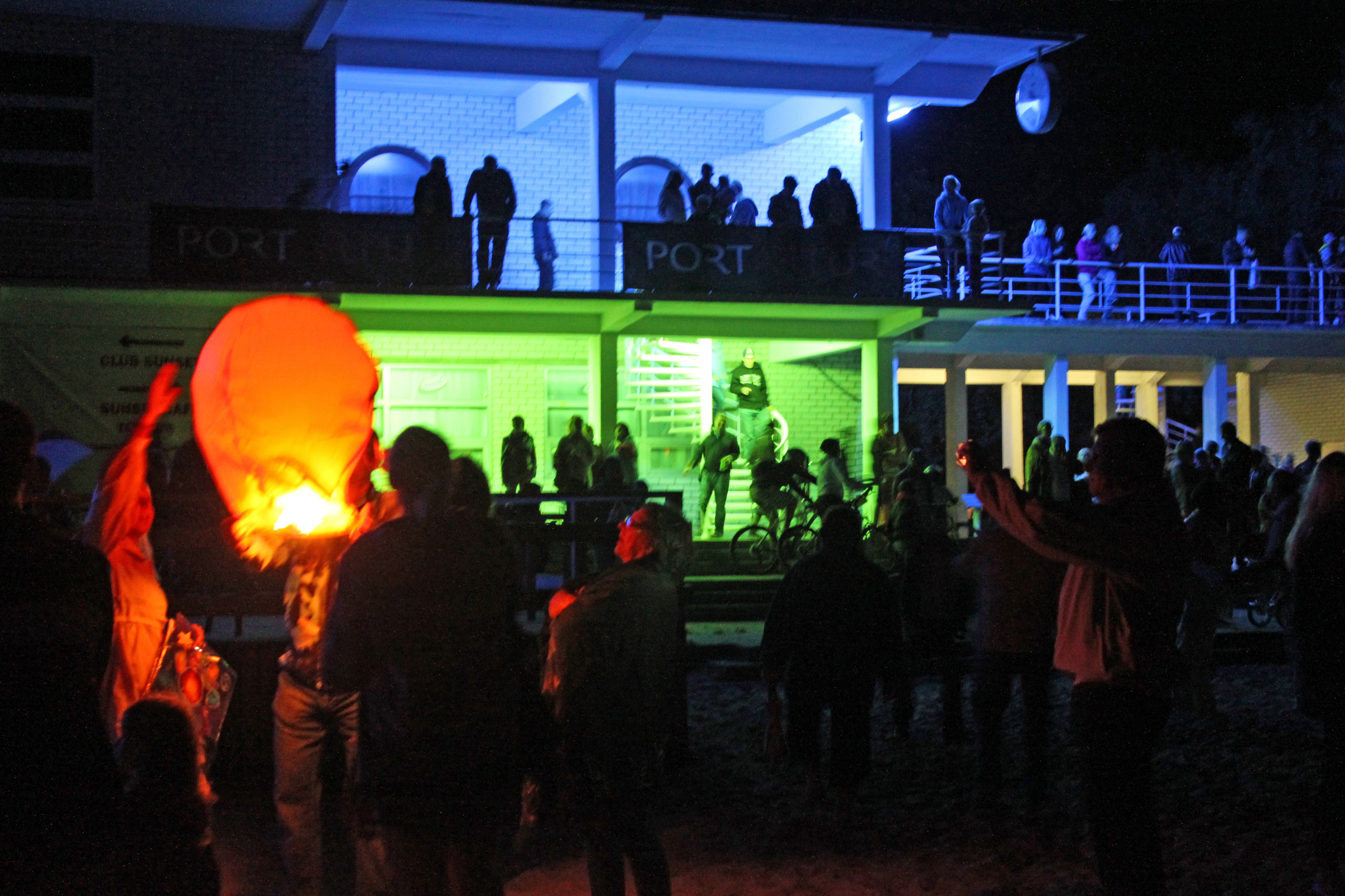
Night of the Ancient Bonfires in Pärnu, Estonia

Nightlife has been a vibrant area of research for sociologists. Nightlife establishments including pubs, bars, and nightclubs function as third places, according to Ray Oldenburg in The Great Good Place.

Some sociologists have argued that vibrant city nightlife scenes contribute to the development of culture as well as political movements. David Grazian cites as examples the development of beat poetry, musical styles including bebop, urban blues and early rock, and the importance of nightlife for the development of the gay rights movement in the United States kicked off by the riots at the Stonewall Inn nightclub in Greenwich Village, Lower Manhattan, New York City.

There is debate about the degree to which nightlife contributes positively to social capital and the public goods of society. David Grazian points out that nightlife can "replicate the same structures of race, ethnic, and class inequality and exclusion found in the larger society."

Grazian cites the use of dress codes by some nightlife establishments in the United States—mostly nightclubs—that specifically targets clothing popularized by hip hop culture represents a form of informal discrimination and segregation on racial grounds. He also noted that nightclubs and club culture can create an environment that encourage or tolerate the "harassment and degradation of women," citing the expectation that both female workers and patrons of bars and nightclubs engage in highly sexualized performances of femininity including dressing in a particularly sexual manner in order to gain entrance to clubs.

== Modernity impact ==
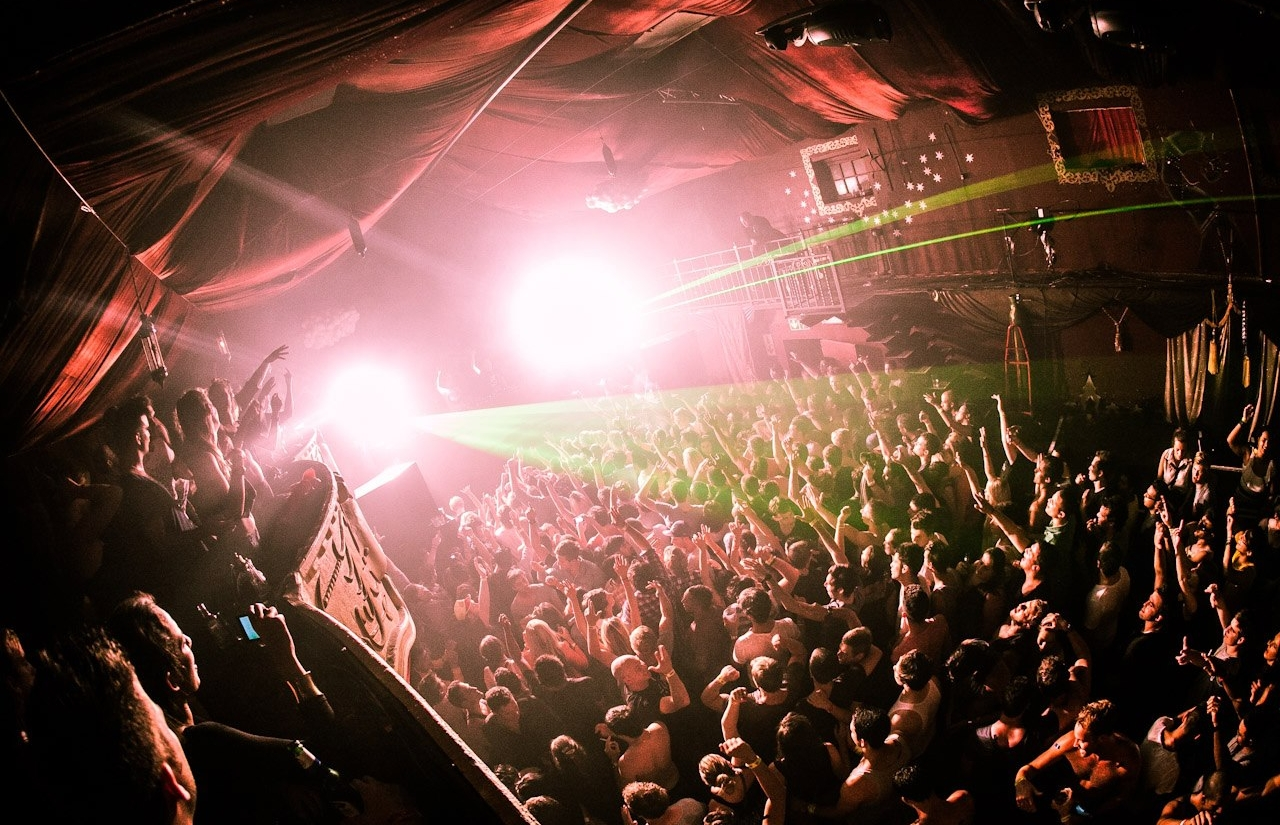
Attendees at a nightclub in Cape Town, South Africa

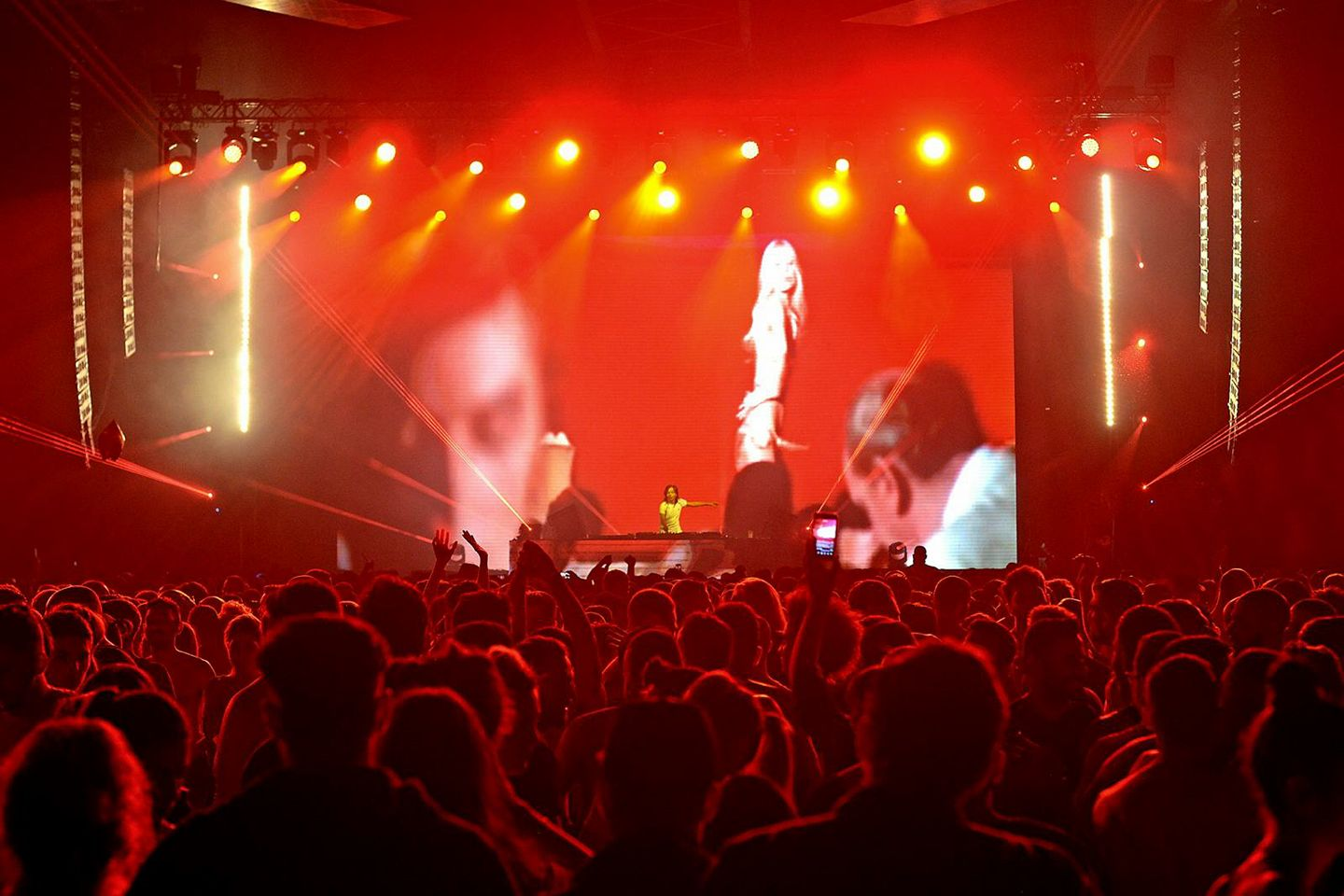
Offer Nissim perform at Haoman 17 in Tel Aviv, Israel

The supervisioned use of lighting in contrast to daylight, is correlated with human control over the use of technology. Research conducted by Euromonitor International indicates a growing demand for unique, immersive nightlife experiences among millennials and zoomers. Moreover, advancements in digital platforms and social media have reshaped how people discover and engage with nightlife, amplifying its influence and reach. As cities continue to embrace innovation and diversity, the nightlife procure remains a dynamic expression of modernity's ever-evolving spirit. The evolve in urban landscape reflects in the nightlife customs through the zeitgeists of contemporary society.

== Regulation ==
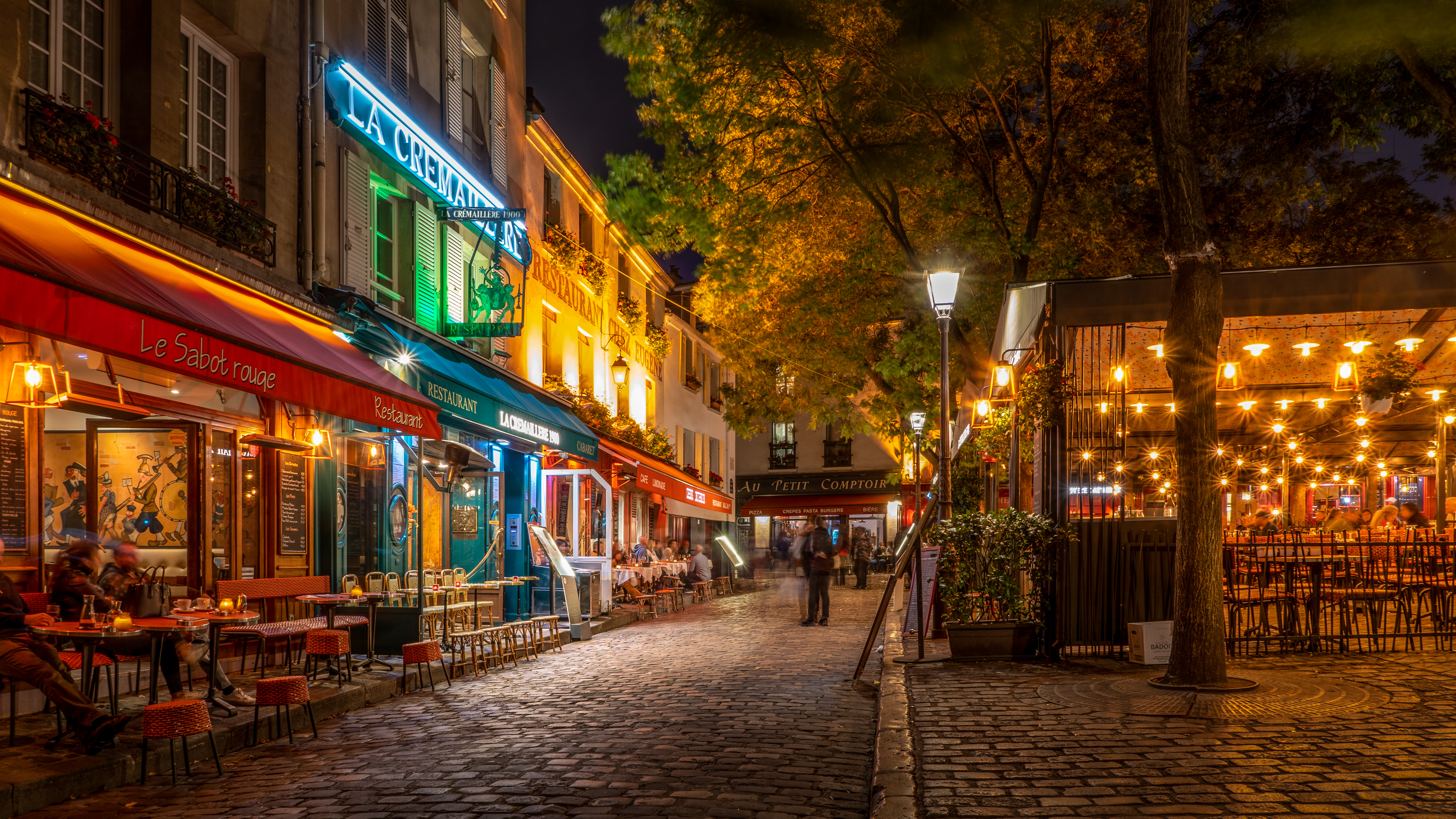
Restaurants in Place du Tertre, Paris

=== Australia ===
Nightlife venues must be licensed to serve alcohol.

=== United Kingdom ===
Nightlife venues must be licensed to serve alcohol under the Licensing Act 2003 (and the Licensing (Scotland) Act 2005 in Scotland). Venues with door security ("bouncers") are also required to ensure that the security staff are licensed by the Security Industry Authority.

Since the introduction of the Licensing Act 2003, pubs and bars have been able to apply to operate until later. For nightclubs, this has become a form of competition as patrons can stay in the same pub or bar rather than move on to a club.

=== United States ===
In the United States, legislation affecting nightlife is handled primarily at state and local levels.
