= B3 (Liège) =

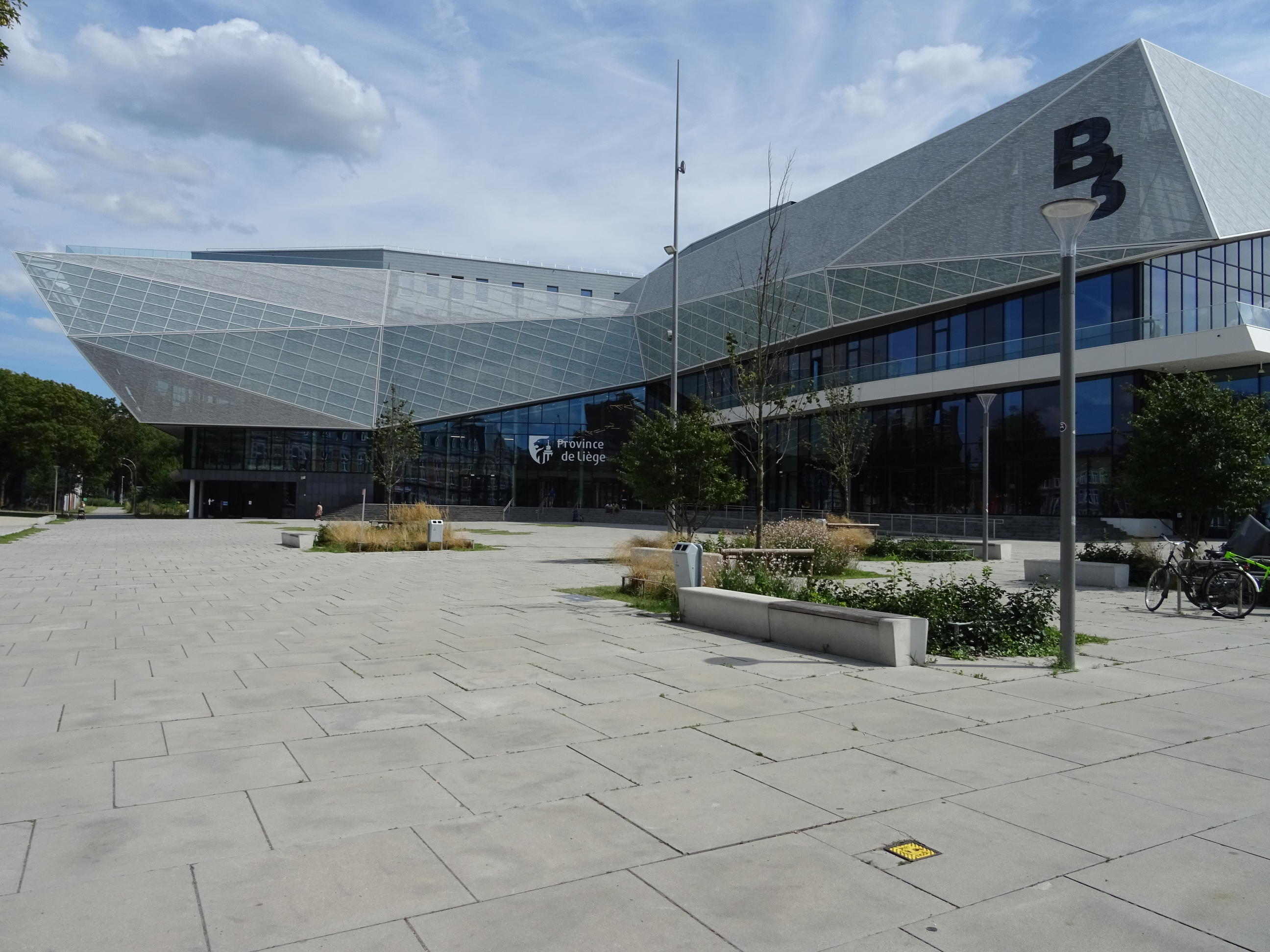

B3 is a cultural and educational building located in the Outremeuse district of Liège, Belgium. It was inaugurated on 24 June 2023, replacing the former Chiroux library.

B3 is structured around three hubs: it houses the Province of Liège's Resource and Creativity Centre, a space dedicated to digital tools – the Exploratory of Possibilities – as well as a business incubator.

== History ==
Building B3 was constructed on the site of the former Bavière Hospital. Work began in 2020 and was completed in 2023. The building was inaugurated on 24 June 2023. It forms part of a broader project to revitalise the Outremeuse district.

== Origin of the name ==
The B3 takes its name from the Bavière site where it is located, as well as from the three pillars on which it is built: discovering, creating and undertaking. The number 3 also refers to the “third place” — between home and work — that the B3 aims to be for its users.
