= Place management =

Place management is the process of making places better. This is practiced through programmes to improve a location or to maintain an already attained desired standard of operation. Place management can be undertaken by private, public or voluntary organisations or a mixture of each. Despite the wide variety of place management initiatives the underlying common factor is usually a desire to maximise the effectiveness of a location for its users, whether they are residents, shoppers, tourists, investors, property developers or business owners.

== Overview ==
Place management is defined by the Institute of Place Management as "a coordinated, area-based, multi-stakeholder approach to improve locations, harnessing the skills, experiences and resources of those in the private, public and voluntary sectors". However, as a conceptual field it remains relatively underdeveloped because of its infancy.

== History ==
Place management has its roots in the management of towns, cities, neighbourhoods and other locations. The reasons for the need for place management are compelling. The proportion of the world's population living in cities has grown from 13% in 1900 to nearly 50% now. Changes particularly in healthcare and technology have led to dramatic shifts in migration practices. Fluctuations in the movement of people places a strain on both urban and rural locations.

Migration is not limited between rural and urban locations but can also happen between countries, creating issues relating to cultural integration. People will migrate for numerous reasons often linked with finding a better quality of life either through superior employment prospects, escaping war or poverty, or even to enjoy a better climate. This can create problems for locations which become exposed to increases in population, decreases in population, or a shift in the demographic composition of a population. Places subsequently act as focal points for the occurrence of phenomena such as globalisation and the clash of civilisations.

Factors such as changing technology not only drive migration, but can in themselves trouble the prosperity of places. Technological development was a driver behind the Industrial Revolution which led to high levels of migration into urban locations. However, further technological development rendered many of the primary functions of successful industrial cities as obsolete towards the end of the twentieth century. Grimond cites New York City as being one city which “went through a bad patch in the 1970s” while other major cities, such as Manchester in the UK which is famed for instigating the Industrial Revolution, also suffered. Rapid technological and industrial change not only creates jobs but can also cause mass unemployment, damaging local economies and leaving pockets of deprivation across regions.

Another important factor in the development of the field of place management is the impact of the retail sector. As a non-judicial parliamentary review of the UK retail sector states, retailing is a necessity for local populations, supplying food and goods in the absence of self agricultural practices. However, shifts in the sector influenced by national and multi-national companies have led to the globalisation of the sector, which raises concerns about the sustainability of the supply of goods and the effectiveness of local economies. Furthermore, all business practices, either positively or negatively, can impact upon the prosperity of the area it is based through the employment of people, investment and skills retention.

As it now appears to be accepted that for numerous reasons places undergo a process evolution which can impact upon their prosperity, it has become more widely acknowledged that deliberate and co-ordinated intervention in this evolution is desirable. Recognising a symbiotic relationship between the prosperity of a location and the prosperity of retail, firms Boots the Chemist, J Sainsburys and Marks & Spencer in the UK contributed to the development of place management by supporting local authorities in the formation of locally based intervention schemes. This led to the appointments of the United Kingdom's first town centre managers in Ilford and the London Borough of Redbridge in 1987. This consequently led to the formation of the Association of Town Centre Management. Between 1987 and 2000 around 500 town centre management schemes covering 600 towns and cities dedicated to co-ordinating various functions of a particular location have been established.

Since the 1970s and 1980s, similar intervention schemes were practiced elsewhere under different guises including urban revitalisation in Poland, activity centre management in Australia, and business improvement districts in the US. Despite their differences, as they each embody the aim of improving the effectiveness of a location, the Institute of Place Management has sought to unify them under the banner of ‘place management’ borrowing a term which was originally conceived in Australia.

== Nature ==
Place management has existed for over 20 years in a variety of forms. It is encompassed within the practice of acts including town centre management, urban revitalisation, activity centre management, regeneration, management, marketing, economic development, neighbourhood management, neighbourhood renewal, socio-economic revitalisation, community development and business improvement district management. However, there exist questions about the practical nature of place management because no clear consensus has yet been developed.

Questions include both the positive and normative aspects of place management. The overwhelming amount of variables which impact upon the effectiveness of a location in serving the needs of its users makes it difficult to determine if place management is being practised in a particular location, how it is being practiced and how it should be practiced. A mixture of cultural, societal, demographic, economic, religious, political, legal and technological issues may all play a role. This is problematic for both the academic and the practical determination of place management.

Although this term is relatively new, place management has, in practice, become an established concept over the last twenty years in Europe, having existed in parts of North America for much longer. It is also an emerging concept in other parts of the world such as Asia and Australia. The concept embraces management of a wide range of locations, which may include public and private spaces of various sizes and geographical spaces. Consequently, place management can take a number of forms. Initiatives can be differentiated by the origins of the resources which support it and the degree of formality which underpins the agreement to secure resources from the various funding bodies.

One example is a community-based (bottom-up) approach, where communities or businesses take the initiative of improving their street, town centre, public park or engage actively with NGOs and the voluntary sector. Among many other examples, this approach has been trialled successfully since 1995 by an association of independent retailers in Granollers, Spain where a not-for-profit association was formed which aimed to enhance the local area for residents and consumers, investing revenue in improvements and charitable causes. This demonstrates an informal place management initiative.

A business improvement district (BID) is a predominantly private partnership (although it can also encompass some public resources) in which businesses in a defined area elect to pay an additional tax in order to fund improvements to the district's public realm and trading environment. These businesses hope to see a return on their investment through an increase in customer spend within the location. The concept of the BID is believed to have been developed in Canada before spreading to the US and across the globe. Unlike the Granollers example, as a BID is a formal place management initiative because it acts as an additional tax which is legally recognised in many of the areas in which they have been set up.

Contrary to the ‘bottom-up’ approach, many place management schemes have been initially formed publicly by local government, which has provided funding to create the post of a place manager. Local government is often seen as a natural home for place management initiatives, as its remit will be to obtain a desired standard of living for its residents. However, the additional financial burden or a lack of place management expertise can hamper efforts to locate place management initiatives with local government.

== See also ==
- Third place
