= This Month in Taiwan =

- Categories: Tourist Magazine
- Frequency: Monthly
- Circulation: 200,000 copies per year
- Publisher: China Commercial Service Group Inc.
- First issue: January 1974
- Company: China Commercial Service Group Inc.
- Country: Taiwan
- Website: www.tmit-media.com

This Month in Taiwan, founded by E. Kirk Henderson and first published in 1974, is the most widely distributed tourism magazine in Taiwan, with an annual estimated circulation of 200,000 copies. The publishers authorizes advertisers or their agents to physically count and verify the quantity of magazines published at its printing plant at any time. This Month in Taiwan is distributed free of charge and available at leading hotels in Taiwan as well as in airports, clubs, government offices and other tourism-related locations.

Common topics covered by the magazine include:

- Tourist attractions
- Maps
- Hotel lists
- Nightlife in Taipei
- Art and culture
- Dining
- Associations and clubs
- Tourism offices
- Public transportation schedules
