= Country Reports on Terrorism =

Annual counterterrorism assessment by the US Department of State

- Presented: Annually (since April 2005)
- Commissioned by: United States Congress
- Author: Bureau of Counterterrorism
- Subject: Terrorism, Counterterrorism, State Sponsors of Terrorism
- Supersedes: Patterns of Global Terrorism (1985–2004)

Official website
- www.state.gov/country-reports-on-terrorism/

Country Reports on Terrorism (CRT) is an annual report submitted by the United States Department of State to the United States Congress, providing detailed assessments of international terrorist activity, trends, and counterterrorism cooperation by foreign governments. Prepared by the Bureau of Counterterrorism, the report is published in accordance with Title 22, Section 2656f of the United States Code, which mandates that the Secretary of State provide Congress with a full annual review by April 30 of each year.

The report was first published in April 2005 covering events of the 2004 calendar year, replacing its predecessor publication, Patterns of Global Terrorism, which had been published annually from 1985 to 2004. Alongside country-by-country security assessments, the report reviews State Sponsors of Terrorism, designated Foreign Terrorist Organizations (FTOs), terrorist safe havens, and includes an Annex of Statistical Information detailing global terrorist incidents, casualties, and perpetrators.

== Statutory mandate ==
The publication of Country Reports on Terrorism is governed by federal statute under 22 U.S.C. § 2656f. Under the law, the Secretary of State is required to transmit to the Speaker of the House of Representatives and the Senate Committee on Foreign Relations an annual assessment covering:

- Detailed reviews of countries where acts of international terrorism of major significance occurred.
- Foreign government cooperation with the United States in apprehending, convicting, and punishing perpetrators of terrorist attacks against U.S. citizens or interests, as well as judicial responses and extradition compliance.
- Identification of foreign territories being utilized as terrorist safe havens and evaluations of government efforts to eliminate them, as mandated by the Intelligence Reform and Terrorism Prevention Act of 2004 (Section 7120).
- Information regarding state support for terrorism, including financial, logistic, diplomatic, and weapons assistance.
- Complete statistical information, to the extent practicable, on casualties, injuries, and kidnappings caused by terrorist groups during the preceding calendar year.

In 2021, the statute was augmented by the National Defense Authorization Act for Fiscal Year 2021 (22 U.S.C. § 2656j), requiring the State Department to incorporate assessments of transnational racially or ethnically motivated violent extremism (REMVE), including white identity terrorism, into its annual reviews.

== History ==
=== Predecessor and 2004 data controversy ===
From 1985 to 2004, the State Department fulfilled its statutory obligation by issuing Patterns of Global Terrorism. The report contained qualitative regional narratives alongside a statistical appendix compiled with data from the Central Intelligence Agency and the Terrorist Threat Integration Center (TTIC).

In April 2004, the State Department released Patterns of Global Terrorism 2003, claiming that global terrorist attacks had fallen to a 34-year low, which Bush administration officials cited as evidence of success in the war on terror. However, independent analyses by economists Alan B. Krueger and David D. Laitin revealed major counting omissions and calculation errors, such as the exclusion of major attacks in Istanbul and Iraq, and truncated data collection that stopped before the end of the calendar year.

Secretary of State Colin Powell acknowledged that the report was "incomplete and in some cases incorrect," and a revised version was published in June 2004 showing that significant terrorist incidents had actually reached a 20-year peak.

=== Restructuring and launch of CRT ===
Following the controversy and the passage of the Intelligence Reform and Terrorism Prevention Act of 2004, which established the National Counterterrorism Center (NCTC), the State Department revamped the publication. In April 2005, the department discontinued Patterns of Global Terrorism and released the first edition of Country Reports on Terrorism (covering 2004).

Under the restructured framework, narrative analysis and foreign policy evaluations remained with the State Department, while data compilation for the accompanying Statistical Annex was delegated to specialized analytical bodies and independent research institutions.

== Structure and content ==
Modern editions of Country Reports on Terrorism typically consist of several standard sections and chapters:

1. Strategic Assessment: An executive overview summarizing global trends in violent extremism, the activities of major transnational groups (such as Islamic State and Al-Qaeda), regional instability, and multilateral counterterrorism initiatives.
2. Country-by-Country and Regional Assessments: Individual reports examining specific nations organized into six regional bureaus:
  - Africa
  - East Asia and Pacific
  - Europe and Eurasia
  - Middle East and North Africa
  - South and Central Asia
  - Western Hemisphere
  Each country assessment details terrorist activity, counterterrorism legislation, law enforcement capacity, border security, countering the financing of terrorism (CFT), and efforts to combat violent extremism.
3. State Sponsors of Terrorism: A statutory review of countries designated by the Secretary of State as having repeatedly provided support for acts of international terrorism under Section 6(j) of the Export Administration Act, Section 40 of the Arms Export Control Act, and Section 620A of the Foreign Assistance Act.
4. Terrorist Safe Havens: Analysis of ungoverned, under-governed, or ill-governed physical territories and cyber spaces where terrorists operate, train, recruit, and transit, along with U.S. strategies to deny sanctuary.
5. Foreign Terrorist Organizations (FTOs): Detailed profiles of organizations designated under Section 219 of the Immigration and Nationality Act, outlining their organizational history, leadership, primary areas of operation, significant attacks, and estimated strength.
6. CBRN and Countering Violent Extremism: Assessments of terrorist attempts to acquire chemical, biological, radiological, or nuclear (CBRN) materials and civilian prevention initiatives.
7. Statistical Annex: A quantitative appendix tabulating incident counts, fatalities, injuries, hostage incidents, weapon types, and geographic distribution across the calendar year.

== Statistical annex and methodology ==
The statistical data accompanying Country Reports on Terrorism has been gathered through three distinct methodological phases:

Period	Compiling Entity	Primary Database / Methodology	Key Characteristics
2004–2011	National Counterterrorism Center (NCTC)	Worldwide Incidents Tracking System (WITS)	Focused on non-combatant incidents meeting statutory thresholds; transitioned from classified datasets to unclassified open-source collection.
2012–2017	START (University of Maryland)	Global Terrorism Database (GTD)	Applied academic event-coding rules requiring incidents to meet strict political, economic, or religious motive criteria.
2018–present	Development Services Group (DSG) & George Mason University (TraCCC)	Global Terrorism Trends and Analysis Center (GTTAC)	Leveraged machine-learning filtering combined with subject-matter validation; added expanded victim and facility typology categorizations.

Due to methodology, counting rule, and definition shifts across these transitions, the Congressional Research Service notes that longitudinal comparisons between different compiler eras must be interpreted with caution.

== Reception and criticisms ==
Country Reports on Terrorism is widely cited by researchers, policy analysts, and governments as a comprehensive annual compendium of U.S. counterterrorism assessments. However, the publication has faced recurring criticisms:

- Politicization of Designations: Counterterrorism scholars and policy researchers have argued that designations—particularly regarding the State Sponsors of Terrorism list and the inclusion or exclusion of specific groups—can be influenced by broader diplomatic relationships, bilateral negotiations, and executive foreign policy priorities rather than purely objective security assessments.
- Methodological Discontinuities: Changes in contractor methodologies, open-source data availability, and differing definitions of "noncombatant" or "insurgency versus terrorism" have created challenges for long-term quantitative trend analysis across multiple decades.
- Publication Delays: Although 22 U.S.C. § 2656f mandates delivery to Congress by April 30 of each calendar year, published editions have frequently experienced multi-month delays, occasionally being released late in the subsequent autumn or following calendar year.

== See also ==
- Patterns of Global Terrorism
- Global Terrorism Database
- Bureau of Counterterrorism
- State Sponsors of Terrorism (U.S. list)
- United States Department of State list of Foreign Terrorist Organizations
