= US-designated state sponsors of terrorism =

U.S. designation applied to certain countries

United States Countries listed by the U.S. Department of State as sponsoring terrorist activities

"State Sponsors of Terrorism" is a designation applied to countries that are alleged to have "repeatedly provided support for acts of international terrorism" per the United States Department of State. Inclusion on the list enables the United States government to impose four main types of unilateral sanctions: a restriction of foreign aid, a ban on weapons sales, heightened control over the export of dual-use equipment, and other miscellaneous economic sanctions. The State Department is required to maintain the list under section 1754(c) of the National Defense Authorization Act for Fiscal Year 2019, section 40 of the Arms Export Control Act, and section 620A of the Foreign Assistance Act.

In 1979, the first such list was published by the State Department, designating Iraq, Libya, South Yemen, and Syria as terrorist states.

As of November 2026, the list consists of Cuba, Iran and North Korea.

== Timeline ==
Timeline: U.S. State Department's "State Sponsors of Terrorism"
1970s	1980s										1990s										2000s										2010s										2020s						
9	0	1	2	3	4	5	6	7	8	9	0	1	2	3	4	5	6	7	8	9	0	1	2	3	4	5	6	7	8	9	0	1	2	3	4	5	6	7	8	9	0	1	2	3	4	5	6
	(Ba'athist Syria) Syria																																												Syria		
Libya																																															
Iraq											(Ba'athist Iraq)	Iraq													Iraq																						
South Yemen																																															
			Cuba																																							Cuba					
					Iran																																										
									North Korea																													North Korea									
														Sudan																																	

== Countries currently on the list ==
=== Cuba (1982–2015, 2021–present) ===
Cuba was added to the list on March 1, 1982, on the basis that it has a history of supporting revolutionary movements in Spanish-speaking countries and Africa.

Havana openly advocates armed revolution as the only means for leftist forces to gain power in Latin America, and the Cubans have played an important role in facilitating the movement of men and weapons into the region. Havana provides direct support in the form of training, arms, safe havens, and advice to a wide variety of guerrilla groups. Many of these groups engage in terrorist operations.

According to the U.S. Department of State, Cuba "encouraged terrorism in the hope of provoking indiscriminate violence and repression, in order to weaken government legitimacy and attract new converts to armed struggle". In 1992, after the Soviet collapse, Fidel Castro stressed that his country's support for insurgents abroad was a thing of the past.

According to Country Reports on Terrorism 2010: August 18, 2011:

Designated as a State Sponsor of Terrorism in 1982, the Government of Cuba maintained a public stance against terrorism and terrorist financing in 2010, but there was no evidence that it had severed ties with elements from the Revolutionary Armed Forces of Colombia (FARC) and recent media reports indicate some current and former members of the Basque Fatherland and Liberty (ETA) continue to reside in Cuba. Available information suggested that the Cuban government maintained limited contact with FARC members, but there was no evidence of direct financial or ongoing material support. In March, the Cuban government allowed Spanish Police to travel to Cuba to confirm the presence of suspected ETA members. Cuba has been used as a transit point by third-country nationals looking to enter illegally into the United States. The Government of Cuba is aware of the border integrity and transnational security concerns posed by such transit and investigated third country migrant smuggling and related criminal activities. In November, the government allowed the Transportation Security Administration representatives to conduct a series of airport security visits throughout the island. Regional and International Cooperation: Cuba did not sponsor counterterrorism initiatives or participate in regional or global operations against terrorists in 2010.

On December 17, 2014, an agreement to restore relations with Cuba was reached (Cuban thaw); President Barack Obama instructed the Secretary of State to immediately launch a review of Cuba's inclusion on the list, and provide a report to the President within six months regarding Cuba's alleged support for international terrorism. President Barack Obama announced on April 14, 2015, that Cuba was being removed from the list. Cuba would not come off the list until after a 45-day review period, during which the U.S. Congress could try blocking Cuba's removal via a joint resolution. Congress did not act, and Cuba was officially removed from the list on May 29, 2015.

Cuba was readded to the list on January 12, 2021, with Secretary of State Mike Pompeo citing "repeatedly providing support for acts of international terrorism" by harboring U.S. fugitives as well as Colombian rebel leaders. Cuba's support for Nicolás Maduro in the presidential crisis, knowing the Maduro administration created "a permissive environment for international terrorists to live and thrive within Venezuela" was another reason for the redesignation. The redesignation came just eight days before Donald Trump's first presidency ended on January 20 at noon.

On January 14, 2025, U.S. President Joe Biden notified Congress of his proposed removal of Cuba from the list of State Sponsors of Terrorism. The proposed removal was part of a Vatican-brokered deal that would see the release of 553 prisoners detained for "diverse crimes", including those arrested during the 2021 Cuban anti-government protests. According to a senior official of the Biden administration, an assessment on Cuba had been completed and found that there was no information supporting Cuba's designation. However, on January 20, 2025, succeeding President Donald Trump revoked the proposed removal of Cuba from the list. The proposed removal never took effect as it required a waiting period of 45 days, which would have been on February 28, 2025.

=== Iran (1984–present) ===
Iran was added to the list on January 19, 1984. According to Country Reports on Terrorism 2013, this was due to its support of various proxies.

Mike Pompeo issued an official statement as the US Secretary of State on 12 January 2021, stating, "al-Qaeda has a new home base: it is the Islamic Republic of Iran."

Amid the 2026 Iran war, the United States House of Representatives passed a nonbinding resolution reaffirming that Iran remains the world's largest state sponsor of terrorism; the measure passed by a 372–53 vote.

=== North Korea (1988–2008, 2017–present) ===
North Korea was added in 1988, following the 1987 bombing of Korean Air Flight 858 near Myanmar and re-listed again in 2017. North Korea was initially added because it sold weapons to terrorist groups and gave asylum to Japanese Communist League-Red Army Faction members. The country is also responsible for the Rangoon bombing.

According to Country Reports on Terrorism: April 30, 2007:

The Democratic People's Republic of Korea (DPRK) was not known to have sponsored any terrorist acts since the bombing of a Korean Airlines flight in 1987. The DPRK continued to harbor four Japanese Red Army members who participated in a jet hijacking in 1970. The Japanese government continued to seek a full accounting of the fate of the 12 Japanese nationals believed to have been abducted by DPRK state entities; five such abductees have been repatriated to Japan since 2002. In the February 13, 2007, Initial Actions Agreement, the United States agreed to "begin the process of removing the designation of the DPRK as a state-sponsor of terrorism.

Terrorology specialist Gus Martin writes in his Understanding Terrorism: Challenges, Perspectives and Issues that "the State Department's list includes countries that have significantly reduced their involvement in terrorism, such as North Korea and Cuba. For example, North Korea was at one time quite active in attacking South Korean interests. In November 1987, North Korean operatives apparently destroyed Korean Airlines Flight 858, which exploded in Myanmar (Burma). The North Korean government has since renounced its sponsorship of terrorism."

On April 13, 2008, Pyongyang agreed to dismantle the Yongbyon facility as part of an aid-for-disarmament deal. In response, on June 26, 2008, President George W. Bush announced that he would remove North Korea from the list. On October 11, the country was officially removed from the list for meeting all nuclear inspection requirements. The U.S State Department said it made the decision as Pyongyang had agreed to the verification of all of its nuclear programs, etc.

Despite requests from the South Korean government to put North Korea back on the list after it allegedly sank the Navy ship the ROKS Cheonan in 2010, the Obama administration stated that it would not do so because the act was conducted by only the North Korean military and was thus not an act of terror. However, following the incident, the Obama administration also stated that it would then closely monitor North Korea for signs for a return to international terrorism. U.S. State Department spokesman P.J Crowley also said that returning North Korea to the list was under continual review.

Former Secretary of State Hillary Clinton stated in 2009 that she was considering renaming North Korea on the List of State Sponsors of Terrorism. As of 2016, North Korea, unlike the other countries removed and the designated state sponsor of terrorism Sudan, was still listed as not fully cooperating with the United States to fight terrorism.

In February 2017, following the alleged state-sponsored murder of Kim Jong-nam (Supreme Leader Kim Jong Un's half-brother) using the nerve agent VX (banned under the international Chemical Weapons Convention, a convention which the North Korean government has not signed), pressure was placed on the Trump administration to revoke Bush's lifting of sanctions. In April 2017, U.S. Congress backed a bill to reinstate North Korea as a state sponsor of terror following the 2017 Shayrat missile strike in Syria, which North Korea had condemned vehemently. In August of the same year, the nation launched a missile that flew over Hokkaido, Japan, promoting severe condemnation from other states. In September, the parents of Otto Warmbier, who had died after being imprisoned in the nation, stated that they want North Korea to be relisted for his apparent murder. On November 20, 2017, President Trump officially announced the re-listing of North Korea as a state sponsor of terrorism.

== Countries under discussion ==
=== Afghanistan ===
On July 25, 2024, Representative Nancy Mace introduced the Preventing the Recognition of Terrorist States Act (H.R. 9163), a bill that would require the U.S. Secretary of State to designate the Islamic Emirate of Afghanistan, the Taliban-led government, as a state sponsor of terrorism. The legislation also prohibits any form of diplomatic recognition or assistance that could legitimize the Taliban regime, citing its ties to U.S.-designated terrorist figures.

=== Russia ===
In May 2022, Senators Richard Blumenthal (D-CT) and Lindsey Graham (R-SC) announced the introduction of a resolution calling on the Biden administration to designate Russia as a state sponsor of terrorism for its war on Ukraine and conduct elsewhere under Vladimir Putin. "Putin is a terrorist, and one of the most disruptive forces on the planet is Putin's Russia," said Graham, introducing the resolution. However, in September the same year, President Biden decided not to designate Russia as a state sponsor of terrorism, saying that the move could backfire by jeopardizing American support for Ukraine.

=== Venezuela ===
In November 2018, The Washington Post reported that the Trump administration was planning to designate Venezuela as a state sponsor of terrorism due to the government's purported ties to Hezbollah and the Revolutionary Armed Forces of Colombia (FARC). Despite the reports, Venezuela has not been added to the list as of 2026 since its leader Nicolás Maduro was captured by US forces and flown to New York to face narco-terrorism charges.

== Countries that have been removed ==
=== Iraq (1979–1982, 1990–2004) ===
Iraq, then under the rule of Saddam Hussein, was added to the list on December 29, 1979. Iraq had sheltered several militant groups during the 1980s, such as the Palestinian Liberation Front, and others. It was removed in February 1982 to allow U.S. aid to Iraq while it was fighting Iran in the Iran–Iraq War. It was re-added on September 13, 1990, following its invasion of Kuwait. In 1993, Iraq's intelligence service allegedly attempted to assassinate former U.S. President George Bush and Kuwait's Emir with a car bomb, but Kuwaiti authorities foiled the plot and arrested 16 suspects, including two Iraqis. Following the 2003 U.S.-led invasion of Iraq and toppling of President Saddam Hussein, Iraq was removed from the list on October 25, 2004, after receiving assurances from the Iraqi interim government that it will not support acts of international terrorism in the future.

=== Libya (1979–2006) ===
Libya was added on December 29, 1979. Then under the rule of Muammar Gaddafi, it was branded a sponsor of terrorism due to the government's support for several left-wing militant groups; including the Provisional Irish Republican Army, the Basque Fatherland and Liberty, the Umkhonto We Sizwe, the Polisario Front, the Kurdistan Workers' Party, the Túpac Amaru Revolutionary Movement, the Palestine Liberation Organization, Popular Front for the Liberation of Palestine, Free Aceh Movement, Free Papua Movement, Fretilin, Kanak and Socialist National Liberation Front, Republic of South Maluku and the Moro National Liberation Front of the Philippines. On May 15, 2006, the United States announced that Libya would be removed from the list after a 45-day wait period. Secretary of State Condoleezza Rice explained that this was due to "...Libya's continued commitment to its renunciation of terrorism".

=== South Yemen (1979–1990) ===
South Yemen was added to the list on December 29, 1979. It had been branded a sponsor of terrorism due to its support for several left-wing terrorist groups. The country was dropped from the list in 1990 after it merged with the Yemen Arab Republic (North Yemen) on May 22, 1990, to become the new Republic of Yemen.

=== Sudan (1993–2020) ===
Sudan was added to the list on August 12, 1993. American officials alleged that Sudan harbored members of the Abu Nidal Organization, Hezbollah, and Palestinian Islamic Jihad.

In October 2020, President Donald Trump announced that the United States would remove Sudan from the list following the ousting and subsequent removal of President Omar al-Bashir, and an agreement with the new transitional government to pay $335 million in compensation to the families of victims of the 1998 United States embassy bombings. On December 14, 2020, the United States officially removed Sudan from the list.

=== Syria (1979–2026) ===
Ba'athist Syria was added to the list on December 29, 1979. It was the last country from the original list to be removed.

According to the 2021 edition of Country Reports on Terrorism published by the United States, the Assad regime continued to provide weapons and political support to Hezbollah and to allow Iran to rearm and finance the organization, as well as permitting the IRGC to remain present and active in the country. Its permissive attitude and facilitation efforts towards terrorist groups involved in the Iraq War led to the growth of activities by terrorist groups such as Al-Qaeda and ISIS inside Syria, in an attempt to justify its repression of the Syrian people and fracture international support for the Syrian opposition. Affiliates of the Kurdistan Workers' Party also operated in Syria.

In 2016, the US District Court of the District of Columbia declared that the financial and logistical support of the Syrian government was crucial for establishing a well-structured pathway for the fighters of al-Qaeda in Iraq in carrying out anti-American combat operations throughout the Iraqi insurgency. The court further stated that Syria "became a crucial base for AQI", by hosting several associates of Al-Zarqawi and leading commanders of the insurgency, and stated that Syria's policies "led to the deaths of hundreds of Americans in Iraq". The district court also found evidence of Syrian military intelligence assisting Al-Qaeda in Iraq and giving "crucial material support" to AQI militants who carried out the 2005 Amman bombings.

Following the fall of the Assad regime in December 2024, it remained unclear whether the United States would remove Syria from its list of state sponsors of terrorism. Hay'at Tahrir al-Sham (HTS), which played a key role in Assad's fall and was led by Syrian President Ahmed al-Sharaa, had been designated a terrorist organization by the United States in 2018. The United States subsequently revoked HTS's Foreign Terrorist Organization designation in July 2025. In May 2025, during his Middle East tour, U.S. President Donald Trump met with Syrian President Ahmed al-Sharaa in Saudi Arabia and announced plans to lift sanctions on Syria, saying he wanted to give the country a fresh start.

On July 8, 2026, Ahmed al-Sharaa met U.S. President Donald Trump on the sidelines of the 2026 NATO summit in Ankara, Turkey to discuss Syrian–American relations and regional issues. Trump praised al-Sharaa as a "fantastic" and "highly respected" leader and said he expected to remove Syria from the U.S. list of state sponsors of terrorism, potentially opening the way for greater economic engagement. Secretary of State Marco Rubio notified Congress that President Donald Trump had decided to rescind Syria’s designation as a state sponsor of terrorism. Under U.S. law, the notification initiated a 45-day congressional review period before the rescission could take effect. The mandatory 45-day congressional review period ended on August 22 without any reported action to block the move, with the final step being the formal publication of the rescission in the Federal Register by Secretary of State Marco Rubio. On August 24, Syria's designation was formally removed by the Department of State. Syria became the first country removed under Donald Trump's second term, the second overall during his presidency, and the first country to be removed from the list since Sudan in 2020.

== Sanctions ==
The sanctions that the US imposes on countries on the list include:

1. A ban on arms-related exports and sales.
2. Controls over exports of dual-use items, requiring 30-day Congressional notification for goods or services that could significantly enhance the terrorist-list country's military capability or ability to support terrorism.
3. Prohibitions on economic assistance.
4. Imposition of miscellaneous financial and other restrictions, including:

- Requiring the United States to oppose loans by the World Bank and other international financial institutions;
- Lifting diplomatic immunity to allow families of terrorist victims to file civil lawsuits in U.S. courts;
- Denying companies and individuals credits for income taxes paid to terrorist-listed countries;
- Denial of duty-free treatment of goods exported to the United States;
- Authority to prohibit any U.S. citizen from engaging in a financial transaction with a terrorist-list government without a Treasury Department license; and
- Prohibition of Defense Department contracts above $100,000 with companies controlled by terrorist-list states.
- From January 2016, the countries listed were included in a separate exclusion from the Visa Waiver Program (VWP) under the Visa Waiver Program Improvement and Terrorist Travel Prevention Act of 2015. People who have been in these countries on or after March 1, 2011, or who are nationals of these countries in addition to the nationality that would otherwise entitle them to a visa waiver, are not eligible for the VWP. Instead, they are required to go through the process of obtaining a visa, and if granted, may travel to the United States. However, those who traveled to such countries for diplomatic, military, humanitarian, reporting or legitimate business purposes may have this ineligibility waived by the Secretary of Homeland Security.
- Under the first Trump administration, citizens of these countries (Iran, North Korea, Sudan and Syria) faced partial entry restrictions to the United States under Presidential Proclamation 9645 of the Executive Order 13780. The order was in force from 2017 until its revocation in 2021.

- Entry of all North Korean and Syrian nationals into the United States as immigrant and non-immigrant was suspended.
- Entry of all Iranian nationals into the United States as immigrant and non-immigrant was suspended unless they had valid student visas (F, M-1, and M-2 visas) or exchange visitor visas (J-1 and J-2 visas), but might be subject to enhanced screening.
- Travel restrictions imposed by the United States on citizens of Sudan were removed under Presidential Proclamation 9645.
- Unlike the previous executive order, these restrictions were conditional and could be lifted if those countries met the required security standards set up by the United States.

== Criticism ==
Michael F. Oppenheimer, professor at New York University's Center for Global Affairs, considers the State Sponsors of Terrorism list as a "negotiating tool" that, in the case of Iran, serves as a "bargaining chip", where the United States would "take them off as part of process of alleviating sanctions against Iran in exchange for what we're asking for in the nuclear agenda". Oppenheimer continues:

Countries that wind up on that list are countries we don't like [...] Other countries and outside powers support terrorism, and objectively speaking are terrorists, and the ones we don't like are on the list, and the ones we're allied with are not on the list. It's all about double standards.

Linguist and political activist Noam Chomsky wrote that Iraq was removed from the list in 1982 "in order to permit the US to join the UK and others in providing badly needed aid for Saddam Hussein, continuing without concern after he carried out his most horrifying crimes". About Syria being in the list, Chomsky writes:

Clinton offered to remove Syria from the list if it agreed to peace terms offered by the US and Israel. When Syria insisted in recovering the territory that Israel conquered in 1967, it remained on the list of the states sponsoring terrorism, and continues to be on the list despite the acknowledgment by Washington that Syria has not been implicated in sponsoring terror for many years and has been highly cooperative in providing important intelligence to the US on al-Qaeda and other radical Islamist groups. As a reward for the Syria's cooperation in the 'war on the terror,' last December congress passed legislation calling for even stricter sanction against Syria, nearly unanimously (the Syria Accountability Act). The legislation was recently implemented by the president, thus depriving the US of a major source of information about radical Islamist terrorism in order to achieve higher goal of establishing in Syria a regime that will accept US-Israel demands.

Chomsky continued:

Returning to Iraq, when Saddam was removed from the list of states supporting terrorism, Cuba was added to replace it, perhaps in recognition of the sharp escalation in international terrorist attacks against Cuba in the late 1970s, including the bombing of a Cubana airliner killing 73 people and many other atrocities. These were mostly planned and implemented in the US [...] Washington was officially condemning the terrorist acts while harbouring and protecting the terrorist cells on US soil in violation of US law.

David Gewirtz, executive director of the US Strategic Perspective Initiative and a cyber-warfare adviser for the International Association of Counterterrorism & Security Professionals writes:

From my point of view, the list is going to sit around until nobody notices it anymore ... It's much easier to let the thing sit there, with all these countries that everyone agrees we don't like, than it is to get rid of a 'terrorist tool.'

== Terrorist safe havens ==
The U.S. Country Reports on Terrorism also describes "Terrorist safe havens" which "described in this report include ungoverned, under-governed, or ill-governed physical areas where terrorists are able to organize, plan, raise funds, communicate, recruit, train, transit, and operate in relative security because of inadequate governance capacity, political will, or both". In the U.S. Annual report published in July 2017, which was mandated by the Congress titled "Country Report on Terrorism", the State Department listed numerous regions as "Terrorist safe havens".

=== Somalia, Libya and Mali ===
In Africa, Somalia was listed as a country where Al-Shabaab finds safe haven, particularly in the Jubba River valley. The poorly-governed regions in the Trans-Sahara, in particular in Mali, is where terrorist groups have used territory to "organize, plan, raise funds, communicate, recruit, train, and operate in relative security". In Libya, porous borders and poorly cohesive security forces along with a large area of ungoverned territory have allowed for a "permissive environment" in which several terrorist groups can operate, such as Ansar al-Sharia, Al-Qaeda in the Islamic Maghreb, Al-Mourabitoun, and the Islamic State of Iraq and the Levant.

=== Egypt, Lebanon, Syria, and Yemen ===
In the Middle East, parts of the Sinai Peninsula of Egypt, operations against Islamic State of Iraq and the Levant – Sinai Province have made the northern part of the peninsula off-limits to tourists. In southern Lebanon, the government was reported to not be in control of "all regions" of the country, nor its borders with Israel and Syria, creating a space for Hezbollah to operate with "relative impunity", and the government has been noted to have made no attempt to disarm the group. Other groups such as the Al-Nusra Front and Islamic State of Iraq and the Levant have been noted to operate in mountainous regions of the country. In Yemen, numerous groups such as Al-Qaeda in the Arabian Peninsula, ISIL operate due to a "political and security vacuum", and have been able to exploit the country's sectarian divide to gain support among Sunnis.

=== Philippines ===
In South-East Asia, several islands in the Sulawesi Sea and Sulu Archipelago, difficult to govern lands have provided terrorist groups the ability to operate under the cover of "traditional smuggling and piracy groups". Abu Sayyaf, Jemaah Islamiyah, and the Bangsamoro Islamic Freedom Fighters also operate in difficult to govern regions on the Mindanao island in the Philippines.

=== Afghanistan and Pakistan ===
In South Asia, the border regions of Afghanistan and Pakistan are labeled "ungoverned areas" which terrorists have been able to exploit in order to conduct terrorist activities in both countries. The State Department stated that terror groups like the LeT and JeM continue to operate, train, organize, and fundraise openly inside Pakistan in 2016. Though the LeT is officially banned in Pakistan, its Jama'at-ud-Da'wah and Falah-e-Insaniat wings are not, although the JuD is "under observation" in accordance with the country's Schedule Two of the Anti-Terrorism Act.

=== Colombia and Venezuela ===
In the Western hemisphere, Colombia's dense rainforests and weak government presence along its international borders were noted to have allowed safe havens for terrorist groups such as the FARC to operate. "Credible reports" have stated that neighboring Venezuela has maintained a "permissive environment" for the activities of "known terrorist groups". In particular, they blame Nicolás Maduro and associates of using "criminal activities" to foster a "permissive environment" for known terrorist groups, including FARC, Hezbollah, and the National Liberation Army.

== See also ==
- Axis of evil
- Executive Order 13769 and 13780
- Iran and state-sponsored terrorism
- Rogue state
- State-sponsored terrorism
- State terrorism
- Pakistan and state-sponsored terrorism
- Israel and state-sponsored terrorism
- United States and state-sponsored terrorism
- United States sanctions
- United States Department of State list of Foreign Terrorist Organizations
- Hezbollah–Iran relations
