= Patterns of Global Terrorism =

Patterns of Global Terrorism was a report published each year on or before April 30 by the United States Department of State. It has since been renamed Country Reports on Terrorism. The Secretary of State is required by Congress to produce detailed assessments about

- each foreign country in which acts of international terrorism occurred;
- the extent to which foreign countries are cooperating with the U.S. in the apprehension, conviction, and punishment of terrorists;
- the extent to which foreign countries are cooperating with the U.S. in the prevention of further acts of terrorism; and
- activities of any terrorist group known to be responsible for the kidnapping or death of an American citizen.

The exact definition of the requirements are in Title 22, Section 2656f of the United States Code.

The only complete print edition—indexed, updated, and supplemented with maps and tables, 1985-2005—was published by Berkshire Publishing Group in 2005.

== Summaries ==
Year	Acts	Killed	Wounded
2004	NA	NA	NA
2003	208	625	3646
2002	199	725	2013
2001	346	3547	1080
2000	423	405	791
1999	392	233	706
1998	273	741	5952
1997	304	221	693
1996	296	311	2652
1995	440	165	6291

Each report includes a short numerical summary. The table at right summarizes the number of international terrorism acts reported each year since 1995. The numbers of those killed or wounded from those acts are also included in the table.

The following list consists of the report excerpts from which the table is based. Note that some of the numbers are revised after initial publication of the report, which causes some of the numbers used in excerpted comparisons to differ from what was originally reported.

- 2004: The report is no longer published to the public after its methodology was challenged by the Bush-Cheney administration, amid claims that it showed the highest amount of terror activity in its nineteen-year history. A new report was created, called the Country Reports on Terrorism, which detailed terrorism by region but offered no statistics or chronology. In a press conference, the State Department said 1,907 people had been killed and 9,300 wounded in terrorist attacks, the highest ever. A chronology of terror events was released by the National Counterterrorism Center (which can be read here)
- 2003: There were 208 acts of international terrorism in 2003, a slight increase from the most recently published figure of 198 attacks in 2002, and a 42% drop from the level in 2001 of 355 attacks. 625 persons were killed in the attacks of 2003, fewer than the 725 killed during 2002. 3646 persons were wounded in the attacks that occurred in 2003, a sharp increase from 2013 persons wounded the year before. This increase reflects the numerous indiscriminate attacks during 2003 on “soft targets,” such as places of worship, hotels, and commercial districts, intended to produce mass casualties.
- 2002: International terrorists conducted 199 attacks in 2002, a significant drop (44%) from the 355 attacks recorded during 2001. 725 persons were killed in last year’s attacks, far fewer than the 3,295 persons killed the previous year, which included the thousands of fatalities resulting from the September 11 attacks in New York, Washington, and Pennsylvania. 2,013 persons were wounded by terrorists in 2002, down from the 2,283 persons wounded the year before.
- 2001: Despite the events of September 11, the number of international terrorist attacks in 2001 declined to 346, down from 426 the previous year. One hundred seventy-eight of the attacks were bombings against a multinational oil pipeline in Colombia — constituting 51% of the year’s total number of attacks. In 2000, there were 152 pipeline bombings in Colombia, which accounted for 40% of the total. 3,547 persons were killed in international terrorist attacks in 2001, the highest annual death toll from terrorism ever recorded. Ninety percent of the fatalities occurred in the September 11 attacks. The number of persons wounded in terrorist attacks in 2001 was 1080, up from 796 wounded the previous year. Violence in the Middle East and South Asia also accounted for the increase in casualty totals for 2001.
- 2000: There were 423 international terrorist attacks in 2000, an increase of 8% from the 392 attacks recorded during 1999. The main reason for the increase was an upsurge in the number of bombings of a multinational oil pipeline in Colombia by two terrorist groups there. The pipeline was bombed 152 times, producing in the Latin American region the largest increase in terrorist attacks from the previous year, from 121 to 193. The number of casualties caused by terrorists also increased in 2000. During the year, 405 persons were killed and 791 were wounded, up from the 1999 totals of 233 dead and 706 wounded.
- 1999: The number of persons killed or wounded in international terrorist attacks during 1999 fell sharply because of the absence of any attack causing mass casualties. In 1999, 233 persons were killed and 706 were wounded, as compared with 741 persons killed and 5,952 wounded in 1998. The number of terrorist attacks rose, however. During 1999, 392 international terrorist attacks occurred, up 43% from the 274 attacks recorded the previous year. The number of attacks increased in every region of the world except in the Middle East, where six fewer attacks occurred.
- 1998: There were 273 international terrorist attacks during 1998, a drop from the 304 attacks we recorded the previous year and the lowest annual total since 1971. The total number of persons killed or wounded in terrorist attacks, however, was the highest on record: 741 persons died, and 5,952 persons suffered injuries.
- 1997: During 1997 there were 304 acts of international terrorism, eight more than occurred during 1996, but one of the lowest annual totals recorded since 1971. The number of casualties remained large but did not approach the high levels recorded during 1996. In 1997, 221 persons died and 693 were wounded in international terrorist attacks as compared to 314 dead and 2,912 wounded in 1996. Seven US citizens died and 21 were wounded in 1997, as compared with 23 dead and 510 wounded the previous year.
- 1996: During 1996 there were 296 acts of international terrorism, the lowest annual total in 25 years and 144 fewer than in 1995. In contrast, the total number of casualties was one of the highest ever recorded: 311 persons killed and 2,652 wounded. A single bombing in Sri Lanka killed 90 persons and wounded more than 1,400 others.
- 1995: In most countries, the level of international terrorism in 1995 continued the downward trend of recent years, and there were fewer terrorist acts that caused deaths last year than in the previous year. However, the total number of international terrorist acts rose in 1995 from 322 to 440, largely because of a major increase in nonlethal terrorist attacks against property in Germany and in Turkey by the Kurdistan Workers Party (PKK). The total number of fatalities from international terrorism worldwide declined from 314 in 1994 to 165 in 1995, but the number of persons wounded increased by a factor of ten to 6,291 persons; 5,500 were injured in a gas attack in the Tokyo subway system in March.

== Problems with 2003 report ==
The 2003 report was released twice, in April and June 2004. The release of the April 29th version led Deputy Secretary of State Richard Armitage to say

Terrorism continues to destroy the lives of people all over the world; and this report we are releasing today, "Patterns of Global Terrorism: 2003," documents the sad toll that such attacks took last year. This report also details the steps the United States and some 92 other nations took in 19 — or 2003 to fight back and to protect our peoples. Indeed, you will find in these pages clear evidence that we are prevailing in the fight.

On June 10, 2004, a few weeks after challenges from two professors (Alan Krueger of Princeton University and David Laitin of Stanford University) and Congressman Henry Waxman, the State Department announced that the report previously issued for 2003 was incomplete and incorrect in part. The revisions issued twelve days later included significant changes, including a doubling of the number of killed and wounded mentioned in the April 2004 version. Here are examples from the section "The Year in Review":

April 29 version	June 22 version
There were 190 acts of international terrorism in 2003, a slight decrease from the 198 attacks that occurred in 2002, and a drop of 45% from the level in 2001 of 346 attacks. The figure in 2003 represents the lowest annual total of international terrorist attacks since 1969.	There were 208 acts of international terrorism in 2003, a slight increase from the most recently published figure of 198* attacks in 2002, and a 42% drop from the level in 2001 of 355 attacks.
307 persons were killed in the attacks of 2003, far fewer than the 725 killed during 2002.	625 persons were killed in the attacks of 2003, fewer than the 725 killed during 2002.
1,593 persons were wounded in the attacks that occurred in 2003, down from 2,013 persons wounded the year before.	3646 persons were wounded in the attacks that occurred in 2003, a sharp increase from 2013 persons wounded the year before. This increase reflects the numerous indiscriminate attacks during 2003 on “soft targets,” such as places of worship, hotels, and commercial districts, intended to produce mass casualties.

In November 2004, news leaked to the Los Angeles Times about an internal report from the State Department's Office of Inspector General. The report found more errors in the 2003 report, and concluded that even the June version "cannot be viewed as reliable" because of questionable statistics on terrorist attacks and casualties, as well as other issues. The inspectors cited some short-term problems from the transition to the government's new interagency Terrorist Threat Integration Center. These included gaps in data entry, inadequate oversight, and personnel issues. They also cited a long-standing failure by the State Department, CIA, and other agencies to use consistent standards for the identification and classification of terrorism-related events.

== See also ==
- Global Terrorism Database
