= Kelsey Montague =

American artist

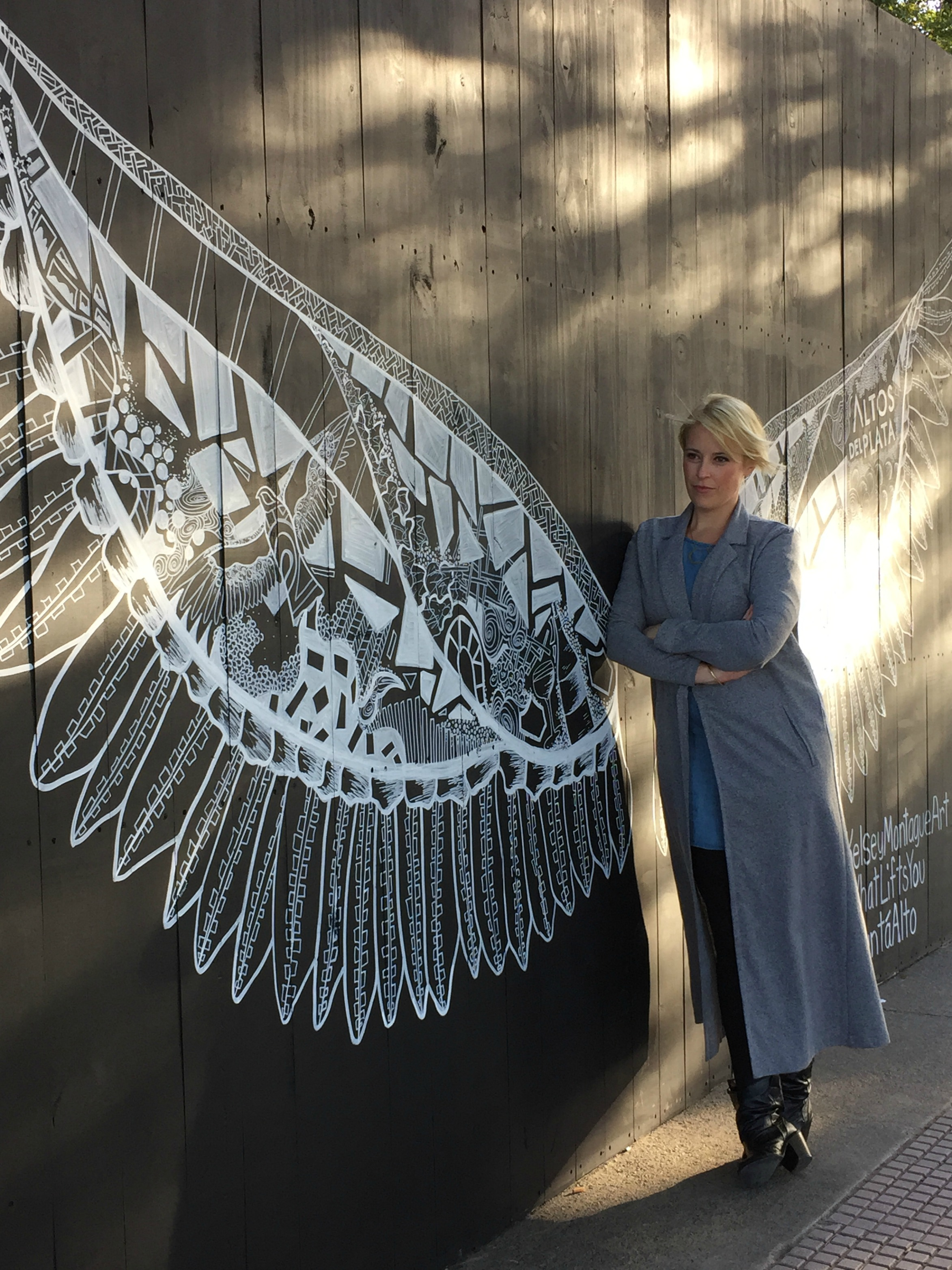
- Born: 1985 (age 40–41)
- Occupation: Muralist

Kelsey Montague (born 1985) is an American illustrator, interactive street artist, and founder of the #WhatLiftsYou social media project. She is best known for her large-scale, interactive street murals that often feature wings and social media intersect.

== Biography ==
Born in Colorado, Montague has lived in Florence, where she studied art, London, New York City, and Los Angeles. She has studied art, design, and media (with combined studies) at Richmond, The American International University in London.

She founded the #WhatLiftsYou Campaign with a purpose of inspiring people around the world to become "living works of art" while considering what most inspires them in their lives. Her work includes murals for Parkland shooting survivors and for the NFL, where she created a mural for the two final Super Bowl teams.

Montague has published two adult coloring books, and partnered with S'well and Starbucks to create a limited edition series of four bottles.

== Murals ==
Kelsey Montague's murals invite spectators to stop and step into her whimsical creations to answer the question #WhatLiftsYou.

A list of the murals completed by Kelsey Montague:

- A Growing Meadow (2018)
- Super Bowl (2020) two pieces created at the request of the NFL to engage fans. Montague was the only female muralist commissioned.
- Universal Studios CityWalk, LA (2017)
- The Cleo, East Nashville (2018)
- Wroclaw, Poland (2017)
- (RED) Room (2017), featuring a rock and roll mural created by Montague for the (RED) Room designed by Johnathan Adler at Andaz West Hollywood. 30% of the sales from this room go to support the (RED) campaign.
- Wynwood Walls (2019) was created for a Wynwood Walls 10 year anniversary event for the class of 2019.
- Angels in America (2018) was created for the Broadway revival of Angels in America.
- United Airlines (2015, 2020), featuring a mural and video created for UA's charitable partner "Peruvian Hearts".
- Nordstrom and Pop Sugar, Palm Springs (2017), a series of balloons created on a movable wall for influencers to interact with at a Coachella Music Festival-inspired event.
- ME, Taylor Swift (2019), was created for the launch of Taylor Swift's single "Me!"
- East Tennessee State University's (ETSU) is the fourth mural she has painted for a college and the first in the South

== Publications ==
- Montague, Kelsey (2016). What Lifts You. Harlequin Adult Coloring Books, ISBN 978-0373099993
- Montague, Kelsey (2016). What Lifts Your Heart. Harlequin Adult Coloring Books, ISBN 978-0373135448
