= The Great Good Place (book) =

1989 book by Ray Oldenburg

The Great Good Place: Cafes, Coffee Shops, Bookstores, Bars, Hair Salons, and Other Hangouts at the Heart of a Community
- Berkshire Edition
- Author: Ray Oldenburg
- Language: English
- Subject: The Great Good Place argues that "third places" - where people can gather, put aside the concerns of work and home, and hang out simply for the pleasures of good company and lively conversation - are the heart of a community's social vitality and the grassroots of democracy.
- Genre: Sociology
- Publisher: Berkshire Publishing Group
- Publication date: 1989/2023
- Publication place: US
- Media type: Print(Paperback); Ebook
- Pages: 384
- ISBN: 9781614720973

The Great Good Place is a book by Ray Oldenburg, published in 1989, reprinted in 1997 and 1999, and republished in 2023. The first edition had the subtitle "Cafes, Coffee Shops, Community Centers, General Stores, Bars, Hangouts, and How They Get You through the Day", but reprints changed it to "Cafés, Coffee Shops, Bookstores, Bars, Hair Salons and Other Hangouts at the Heart of a Community." In his book, Oldenburg argues that so-called third places are important for democracy, civic engagement, and a sense of place. Oldenburg's coauthor Karen Christensen argues in the 2026 sequel that third places are the answer to loneliness, political polarization, and climate resilience. She also clarifies the difference between third places and public spaces.

== Third places ==
The book is notable for coining the term "third place".

Oldenburg asserts that informal gathering places, such as those he refers to as "third places," are crucial for fostering community and civility. These spaces, where conversation takes center stage and gatherings are unplanned, serve as equalizers, transcending distinctions of status, class, and race. Oldenburg argues that the decline of Third Places has contributed to the erosion of community, civility, and increased isolation and division within American society.

Other than the numerous personal benefits third places offer their regulars, Oldenburg advocates for the immense social value they bring and points out their historical role, amongst others:

- The American tavern in the American Revolution
- The French café in the French Revolution
- The London coffee house during the Enlightenment
- The agora in Greek democracy
