= Berkshire Publishing Group =

American publishing company

- Founded: 2000
- Founder: Karen Christensen
- Country of origin: United States
- Headquarters location: Great Barrington, Massachusetts
- Distribution: self-distributed (most of world); Eurospan Group (Europe); China Publishers Services (China)
- Publication types: Books, Journals, Databases, Podcasts
- Nonfiction topics: World history, big history, international relations, sustainability, Chinese history and culture, global cuisines
- Official website: www.berkshirepublishing.com

Berkshire Publishing Group LLC is an American publishing house founded in 2000 by editor and author Karen Christensen and anthropologist David Levinson as an academic reference book producer, developing encyclopedias for Scribner's, Routledge, Sage, Macmillan, H. W. Wilson, and ABC-CLIO. The company became an independent imprint in 2005, with the launch of Berkshire Encyclopedia of World History, edited by William H. McNeill, Jerry H. Bentley, David Christian, et al. In 2009, it began publishing individual course titles as well as major encyclopedias. The company is owned by Karen Christensen and operates internationally from Great Barrington, Massachusetts.

Berkshire offers print and online publications on world history, international relations, sports, community, religion and society, popular culture and environmental issues. The publications focus on global perspectives: while many reference publishers and free online sources focus on the "who, what, when, and where" structure for presenting a topic, Berkshire specializes in providing resources from expert contributors who probe for deeper context and analysis, thereby helping to explain how and why.

Berkshire also claims to make special efforts in its reference titles to bring the work of acclaimed scholars to a wide general audience and to high school students.

The company publishes the Dictionary of Chinese Biography, Berkshire Encyclopedia of China, the Berkshire Encyclopedia of Sustainability, and the Berkshire Encyclopedia of World History., as well as Patterns of Global Terrorism.
