= Karen Christensen =

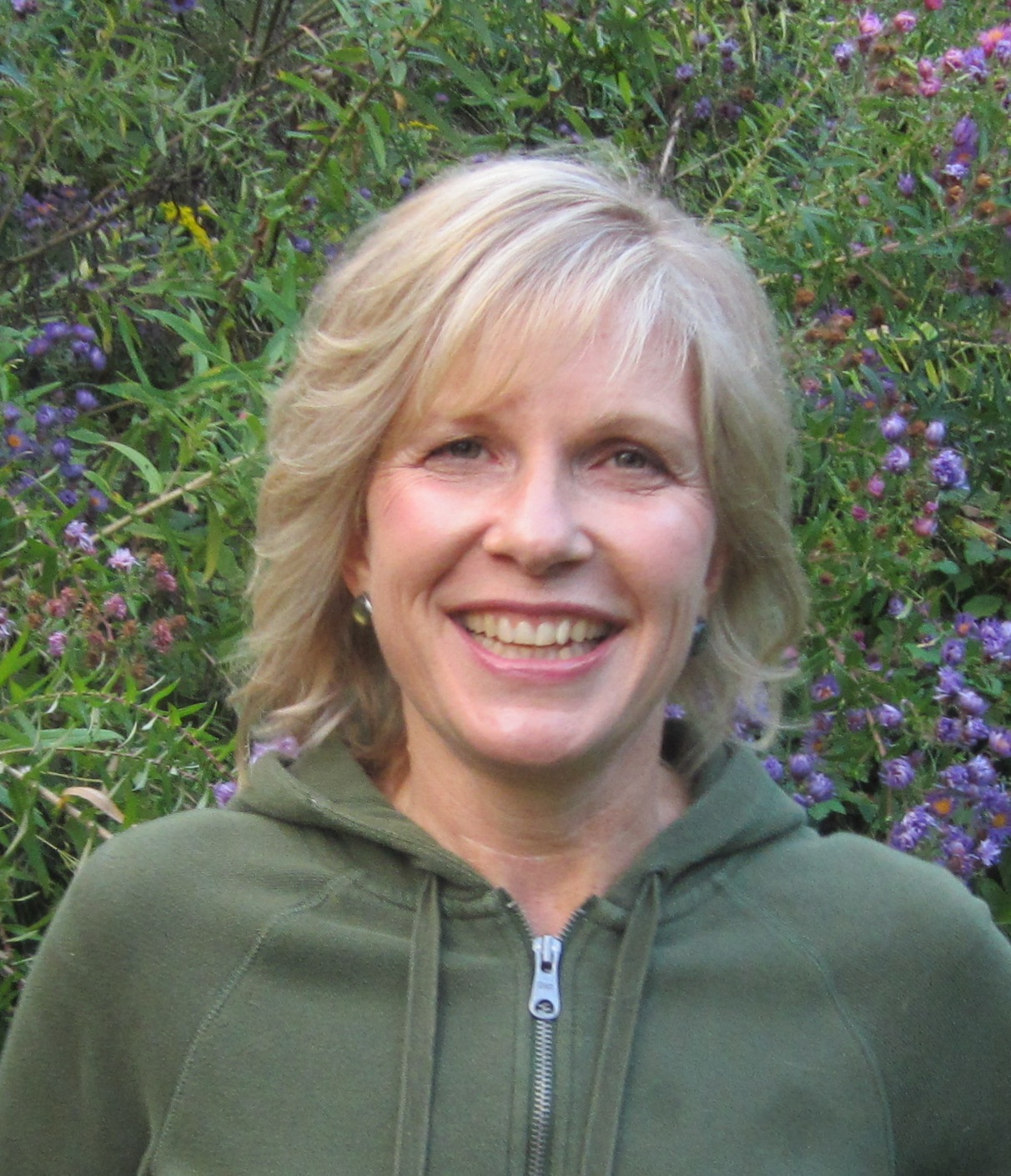
- Christensen in her garden in Great Barrington, Massachusetts, 2012
- Born: Indiana, United States
- Occupations: Author; entrepreneur; environmentalist

Karen Christensen is an American author, social critic, and entrepreneur who cofounded Berkshire Publishing Group in Great Barrington, Massachusetts, in 1998, after working in London at Blackwell Scientific Publications and Faber & Faber. She is owner and CEO of Berkshire Publishing, and co-author of The Great Good Place II, the sequel to sociologist Ray Oldenburg's influential book in which Oldenburg first coined the term third place.

== Early life ==
Christensen's family came from the American Midwest. She was born in Indiana. Her father was a computer engineer and she grew up in Silicon Valley, in California. She was educated in the United Kingdom and at the College of Creative Studies at the University of California, Santa Barbara, where she studied with the critic Marvin Mudrick (whose books she began republishing in 2017). She had turned down Yale to study with Mudrick and turned down a post-graduation job at Condé Nast in New York.

== Career ==
Christensen began her writing career with several cover stories for the UCSB alumni magazine, including a travel memoir and a feature about the Institute for Theoretical Physics, which included interviews with physicist Lee Smolin. After college she went first to Australia and then to London, where she worked at Blackwell Scientific Publications and then for Faber & Faber as secretary and editorial assistant to Valerie Eliot on the first volume of T. S. Eliot's Letters (1988). Her memoir Dear Mrs. Eliot was the cover story in the U.K. newspaper The Guardian's Review.. When Valerie Eliot died in 2012, Christensen was quoted in The Times, the New York Times, and the Independent articles about the Eliot legacy. Christensen was working with Sophia Mumford, widow of Lewis Mumford, on a book about her life when Mumford died in 1997.

After returning to the United States in 1990 to promote the US edition of her first book, Home Ecology, she took a job as managing editor of the Encyclopedia of U.S. Foreign Relations, working with the Council on Foreign Relations in New York. In 1998 she cofounded Berkshire Publishing Group. She made her first trip to China in 2001 while working on the Encyclopedia of Modern Asia for Charles Scribner's Sons and later developed a number of China-related publications including Guanxi: The China Letter, the Encyclopedia of China, and ChinaConnectU.com. In 2017, she announced a partnership with the Encyclopedia of China Publishing House, part of the China Publishing Group, and their plans for an International Editorial Center in New York and Beijing.

Christensen worked closely with William H. McNeill until his death in 2016, frequently writing about him as well as collaborating on the Encyclopedia of World History and other books. She was the senior editor of the SAGE Encyclopedia of Community and co-editor of the Scribners Encyclopedia of Modern Asia as well as The Business of Sustainability. She is the author of several popular environmental handbooks and a children's picture book, Rachel's Roses, published by Barefoot Books. Her books have been translated into French, German, Swedish, Chinese, Japanese, Korean, and Thai.

Christensen was a speaker on women's issues for the UK Green Party and a trustee of the Environmental Design Association as well as a founding member of the Women's Environmental Network. She has served on the board of the Software and Information Industry Association (SIIA) Content Division, and was an appointed and then elected member of the Berkshire Hills Regional School Committee. In 2015, she ran unsuccessfully for a seat on the Great Barrington Select Board. She is a member of the National Committee on United States-China Relations and an associate in research at the Fairbank Center at Harvard University. She was a trustee of the University of Pennsylvania Press until her controversial resignation in 2021.

Christensen founded the Train Campaign, an educational outreach project to support the revival of passenger train service in the United States. She lives in Great Barrington, Massachusetts, where she ran a popular listserv called TheHillGB.

== Bibliography ==
- 2025 - The Great Good Place II (coauthor with Ray Oldenburg)
- 2024 - Women and Leadership (editor and contributing author on #MeToo)
- 2022 - Writing Great Tom (editor)
- 2018 - Asian Cuisines (editor)
- 2014 - The Future of Sustainability (contributing author)
- 2012 - The Business of Sustainability (co-editor)
- 2008 - China Gold: China's Rise to Global Power and Olympic Glory (co-editor)
- 2004/2008 - The Armchair Environmentalist (author; English, French, Thai, Swedish editions)
- 2007 - Global Perspectives on the United States (co-editor)
- 2004 - Encyclopedia of Community (co-editor)
- 2002 - Encyclopedia of Modern Asia (co-editor)
- 2000 - Eco Living (author; UK, simplified Chinese, Korean editions)
- 1995 - The Green Home (author; UK, French, traditional Chinese editions)
- 1995 - Rachel's Roses (author; UK, German, Japanese editions)
- 1989 - Home Ecology (author; UK and US editions)
