= Ray Oldenburg =

American sociologist (1932–2022)

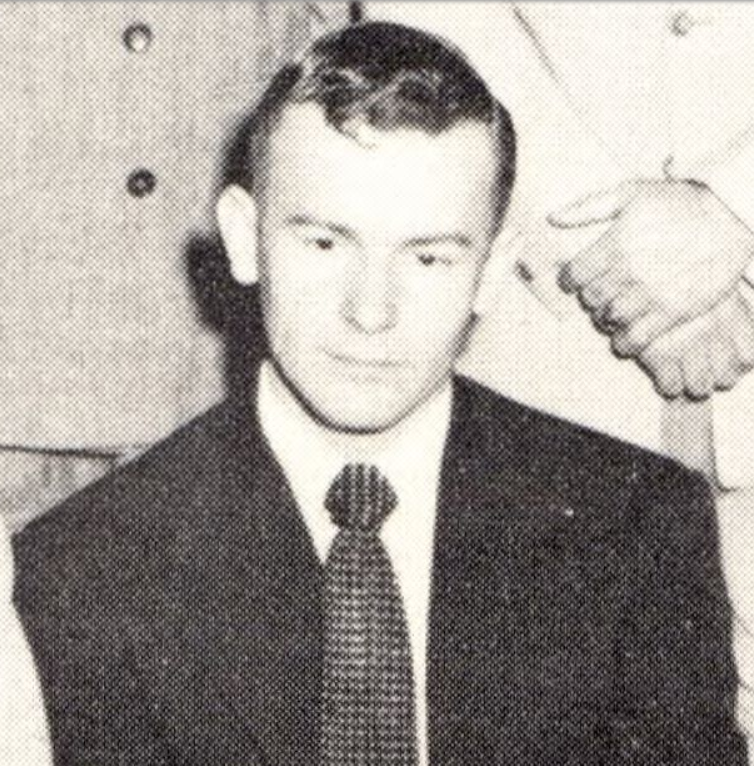
Oldenburg in 1954

Ray Oldenburg (April 7, 1932 – November 21, 2022) was an American urban sociologist who is known for writing about the importance of informal public gathering places for a functioning civil society, democracy, and civic engagement. He coined the term "third place" and is the author of The Great Good Place (which was a New York Times Book Review Editor's Choice for 1989) and the 2001 Celebrating The Third Place. With his coauthor Karen Christensen, to whom he left the task of completing a sequel, he continued to argue that third places are the answer to loneliness, political polarization, and climate resilience. The original The Great Good Place was republished in print in 2023 and audio in 2025.

== Personal life ==
Oldenburg was born in Henderson, Minnesota, on April 7, 1932. He was raised by Grace and Raymond Oldenburg and lived a straightforward life throughout high school and undergraduate school before serving in the army for two years in the South of France. While continuing his academic career, he eventually married Judith Oldenburg at the age of 35, having three children and eight grandchildren.

On November 21, 2022, Oldenburg died at the age of 90.

== Academic career ==
Oldenburg was professor emeritus at the Department of Sociology and Anthropology at the University of West Florida in Pensacola. He received his B.S. in English and Social Studies from Mankato State University in 1954. He then received his M.A. and Ph.D. in Sociology from the University of Minnesota in 1965 and 1968, respectively.

== Philosophy ==
Oldenburg suggests that beer gardens, main streets, pubs, cafés, coffeehouses, post offices, and other "third places" are the heart of a community's social vitality and the foundation of a functioning democracy. They promote social equality by leveling the status of guests, provide a setting for grassroots politics, create habits of public association, and offer psychological support to individuals and communities.

Oldenburg identifies that each person has a first and second place, where the former represents environments that are informal and isolating (home) while the latter represents environments that are formal, structured, and mission-driven (workplaces). Thus, the existence of third places offers individuals a neutral public space for connecting and establishing bonds with others in a non-purposeful environment. Third places "host the regular, voluntary, informal, and happily anticipated gatherings of individuals beyond the realms of home and work."

Oldenburg is primarily concerned by the disappearance of third places as suburbanization continues in modern societies. He is aware that modern suburbs only offer first and second places with a mandatory car-centric commute between them, and that "public" places have become commercialized to the extent in which one is required to purchase a good or service and is forbidden to "loitering." His latest and last book was The Joy of Tippling.

== Bibliography ==
- Oldenburg, Ray (2023). The great good place: cafes, coffee shops, bookstores, bars, hair salons, and other hangouts at the heart of a community (2nd ed.). Great Barrington, Massachusetts: Berkshire Publishing Group LLC. ISBN 978-1-61472-097-3.
- The Great Good Place: Cafes, Coffee Shops, Community Centers, Beauty Parlors, General Stores, Bars, Hangouts, and How They Get You Through the Day. New York: Paragon House. 1989. ISBN 978-1-55778-110-9.
- Oldenburg, Ray (1991). The Great Good Place. New York: Marlowe & Company. ISBN 978-1-56924-681-8.
- Oldenburg, Ray (2018). The Joy of Tippling: A Salute to Bars, Taverns, and Pubs. Great Barrington, Massachusetts: Berkshire Publishing Group. ISBN 978-1614728382.
