= Third place =

Social space other than home or workplace

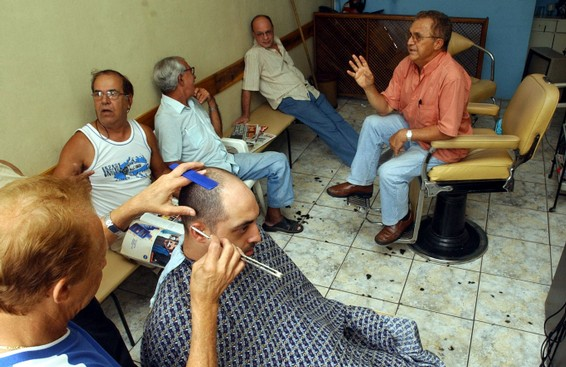
This barber shop in Brazil is an example of a third place. In many societies, barber shops and beauty salons serve as traditional areas for people to congregate, separate from home and the workplace.

In sociology, a third place is a social space separate from the two usual social environments of home ("first place") and workplace ("second place"). Examples of third places include churches, cafes, bars, clubs, libraries, gyms, bookstores, hackerspaces, stoops, parks, and theaters. In his book The Great Good Place (1989), Ray Oldenburg argues that third places are important for democracy, civic engagement, and a sense of place. In the 2023 edition, Oldenburg's coauthor Karen Christensen argues that third places are the answer to loneliness, political polarization, and climate resilience. She also clarifies the difference between third places and public spaces.

== Oldenburg and Christensen's characteristics of third places ==
American sociologist Ray Oldenburg called one's "first place" the home and the people the person lives with. The "second place" is the workplace—where people may actually spend most of their waking time. Third places, then, are "anchors" of community life and facilitate and foster broader, more creative interaction. In other words, "your third place is where you relax in public, where you encounter familiar faces and make new acquaintances."

In The Great Good Place, Oldenburg and co-author Karen Christensen discuss the seven characteristics of third places. A third place is:

Open and inviting.
You don't need an invitation or appointment, and you can come and go as you please.
Comfortable and informal.
You feel that you belong there.
Convenient.
It's close enough to visit often, ideally right in your own neighborhood.
Unpretentious.
Everyone is on the same level, there's nothing fancy or fragile, and it's not expensive.
There are regulars.
And often there's a host who greets people as they arrive.
Conversation is the main activity.
Discussion, debate, and gossip are part of the mix.
Laughter is frequent.
The mood is light-hearted and playful. Joking and witty banter are encouraged.

== Historical examples ==
The term "third place" itself was first established in the book The Great Good Place (1989), written by the sociologist Ray Oldenburg. Locales of this type have been identified throughout human history.

=== Ancient Greek agora ===
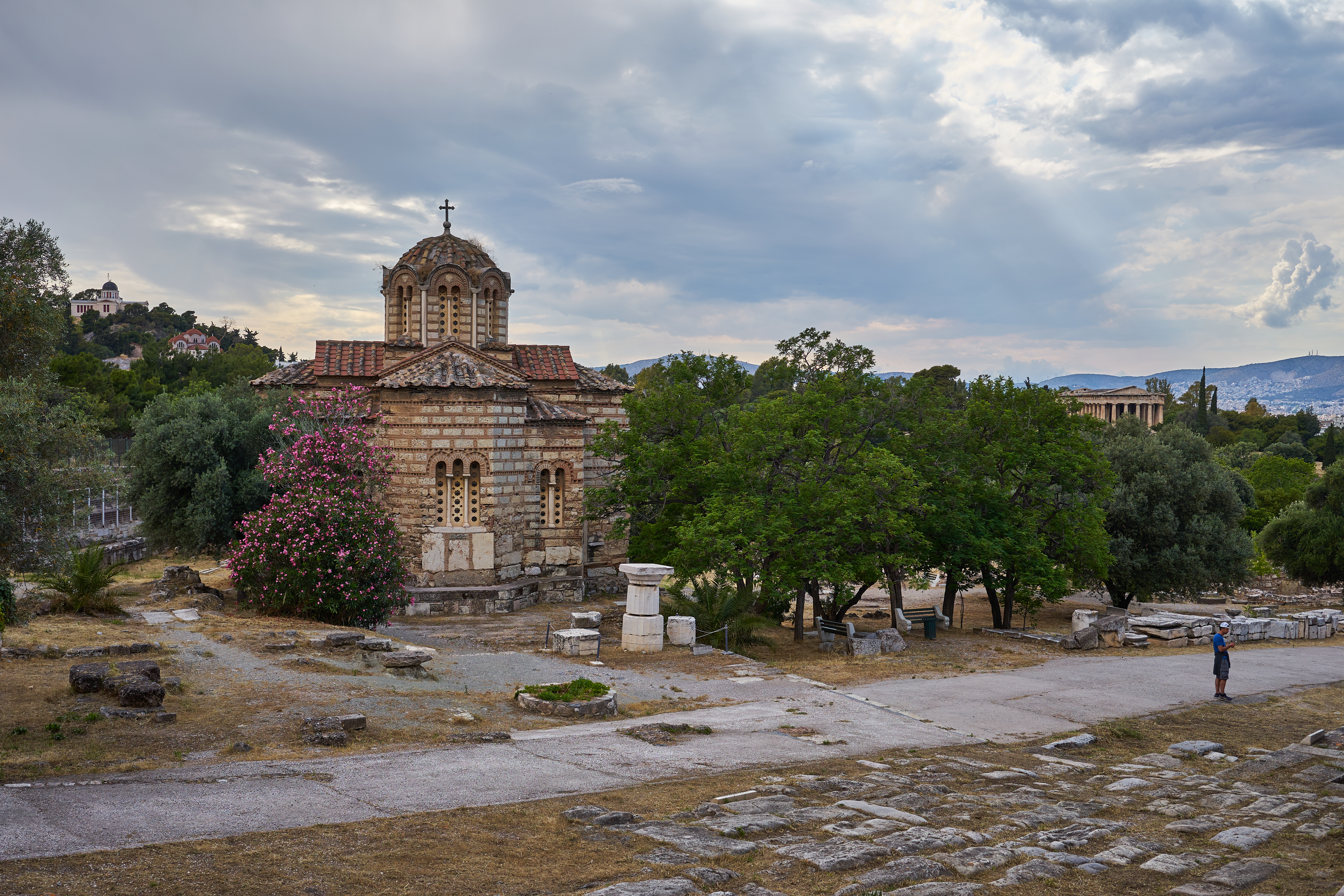
The Ancient Agora of Athens

Ancient Greeks and their agora, or public squares, are among some of the first well-documented communal spaces that could be considered a "third place". They served as marketplaces to exchange goods and currency, or engage in political debate. These gatherings would host people from all walks of life: political figures, poets, philosophers, and common folk, subsets of people that wouldn't have otherwise interacted as part of their daily routine. Modern evolutions and derivations of the agora have remained prevalent in many subsequent civilizations. The term agoraphobia, or fear of open public spaces, originates from this Grecian meeting spot.

=== Imperial Chinese teahouses ===
Being defined as a separate physical sphere from one's home or place of work, teahouses were prevalent third places in society. Tea evolved into a functionally social drink in the ancient Jin Dynasty from the period 265–316AD. These shops allowed businessmen to conduct meetings in a discreet manner. Time spent in these locations was used as a tool to show off of one's status and ability to spend money on simple luxuries. Teahouses would come to function as central meeting places and "instrumental fixture in the nucleus of provincial towns".

=== The European coffeehouse ===
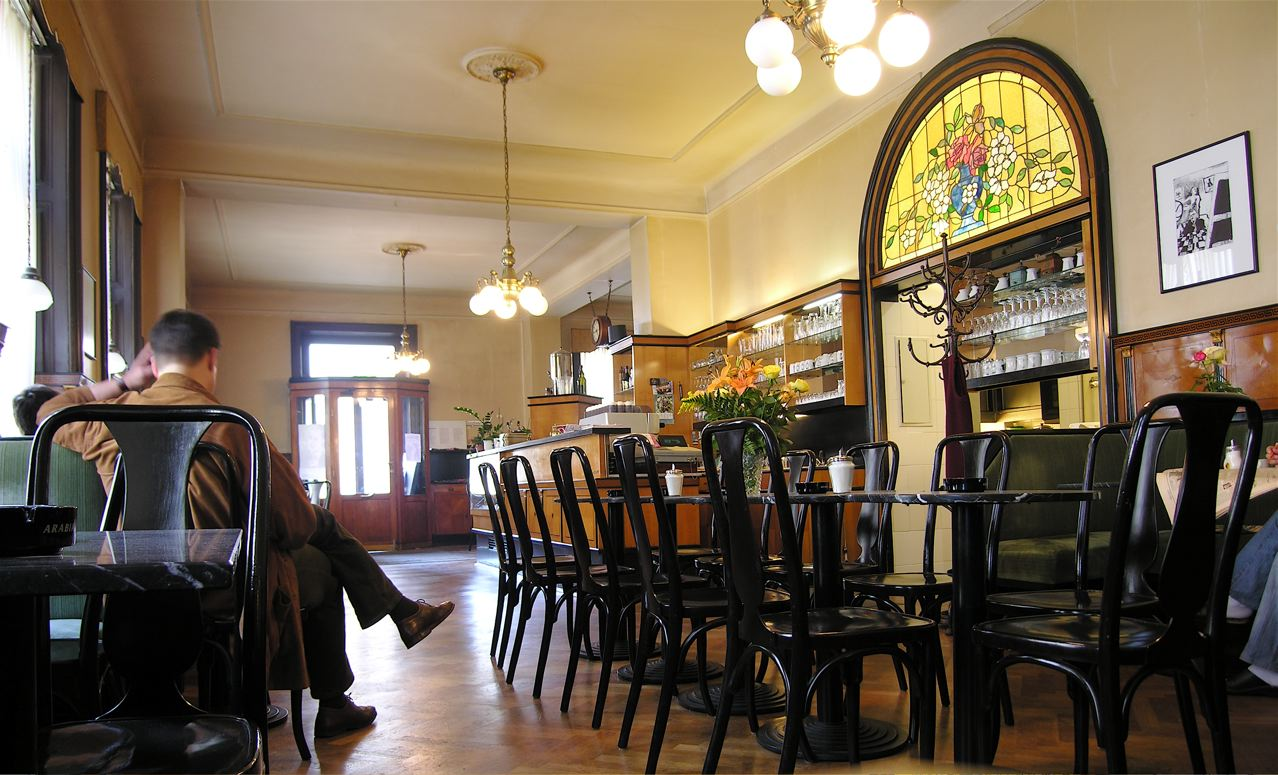
Coffeehouse in Vienna

Food and drink often have been closely associated with the idea of third places; they offer inciting motivation to attend, but would not get in the way of conversation. Not dissimilar to tea houses, the increasing popularity of coffeehouses during England's 17th Century became societal staples for community building. According to a UNESCO article co-written by Ray Oldenburg himself, "As places of free speech allowing a certain level of equality, coffeehouses can be seen as the precursors of democracy". Coffee is a stimulant, in contrast to the depressor that was the rampant alcohol consumption before this point in English history. Thus, these coffee houses became "a real political arena". They were referred to as "Penny Universities" in the way that they enabled attendees to expose themselves to intellectual fervor with no financial barrier of entry.

Following into the 21st century, coffeeshops are still one of the most ubiquitous third places. These conversation hotspots have been reflected in media as hubs of human connection and belonging, like the Central Perk coffeeshop (Friends), or similarly the Cheers bar (Cheers).

== Types ==
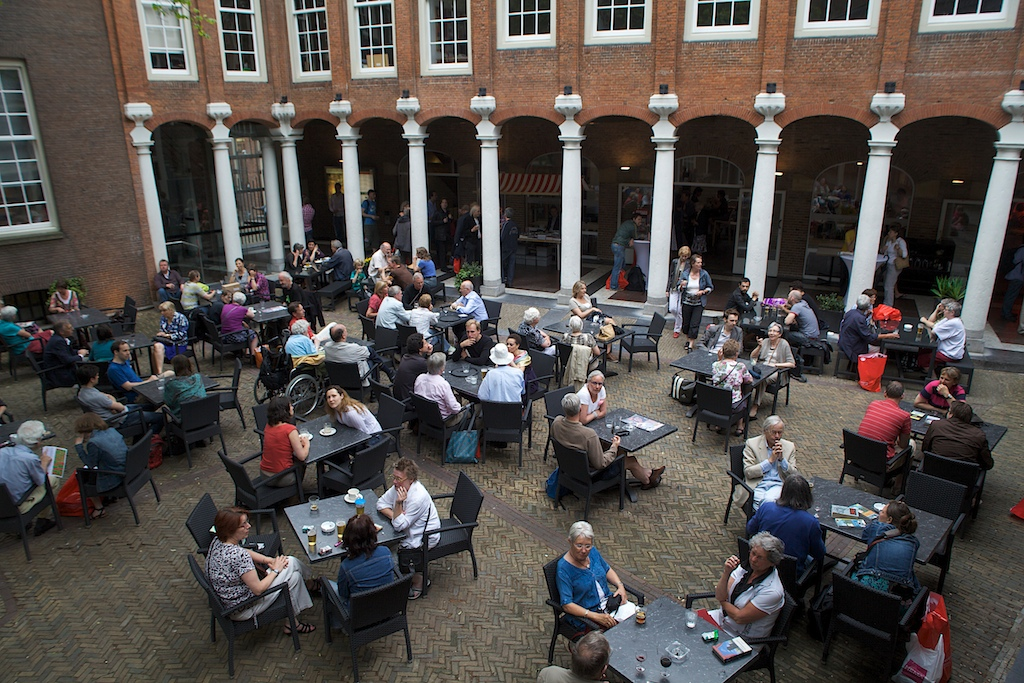
People sitting at tables at the Jongensbinnenplaats (lit. 'Boys' Courtyard') in the Amsterdam Museum in Amsterdam, Netherlands

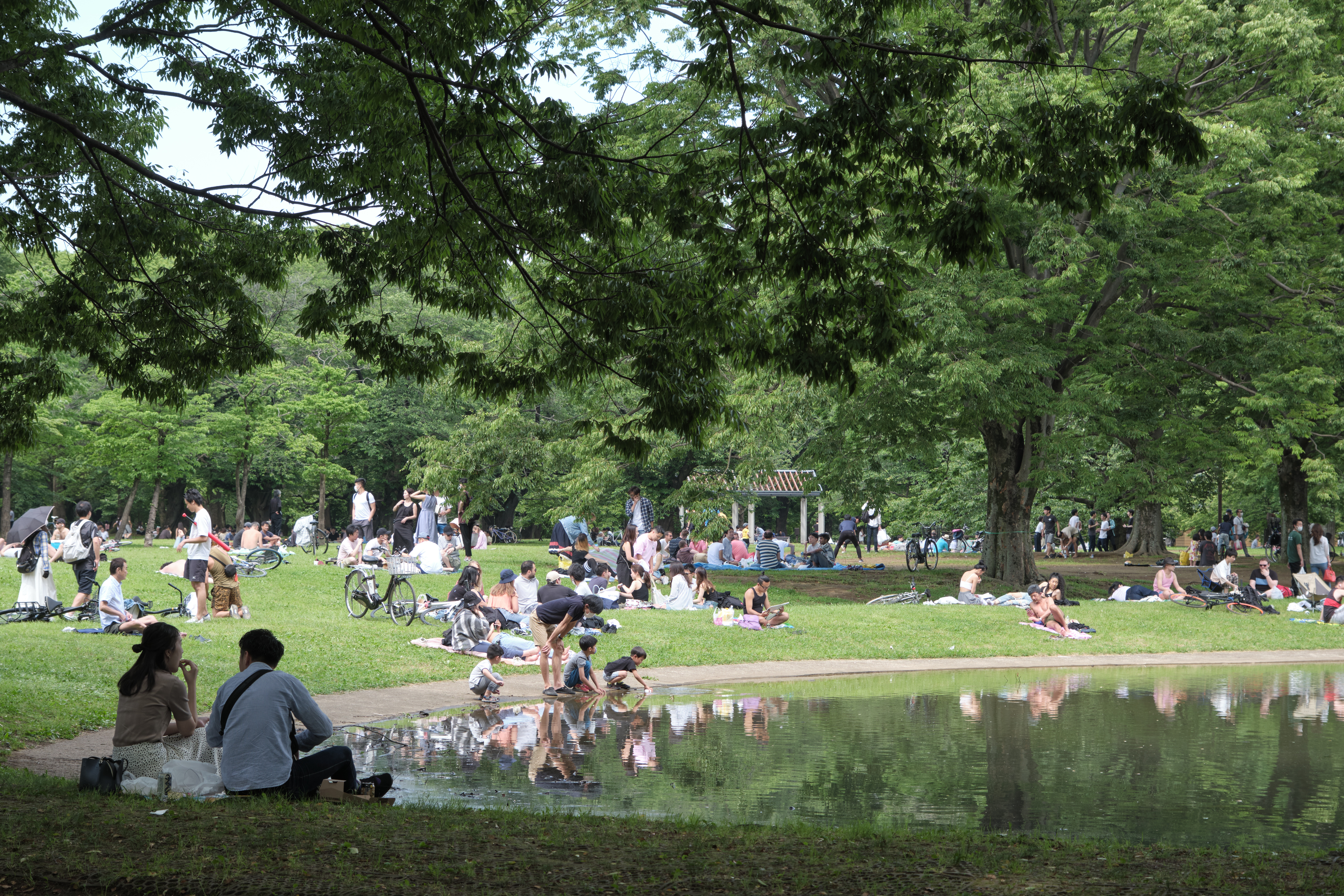
Several groups of people at Yoyogi Park in Shibuya, Tokyo, Japan

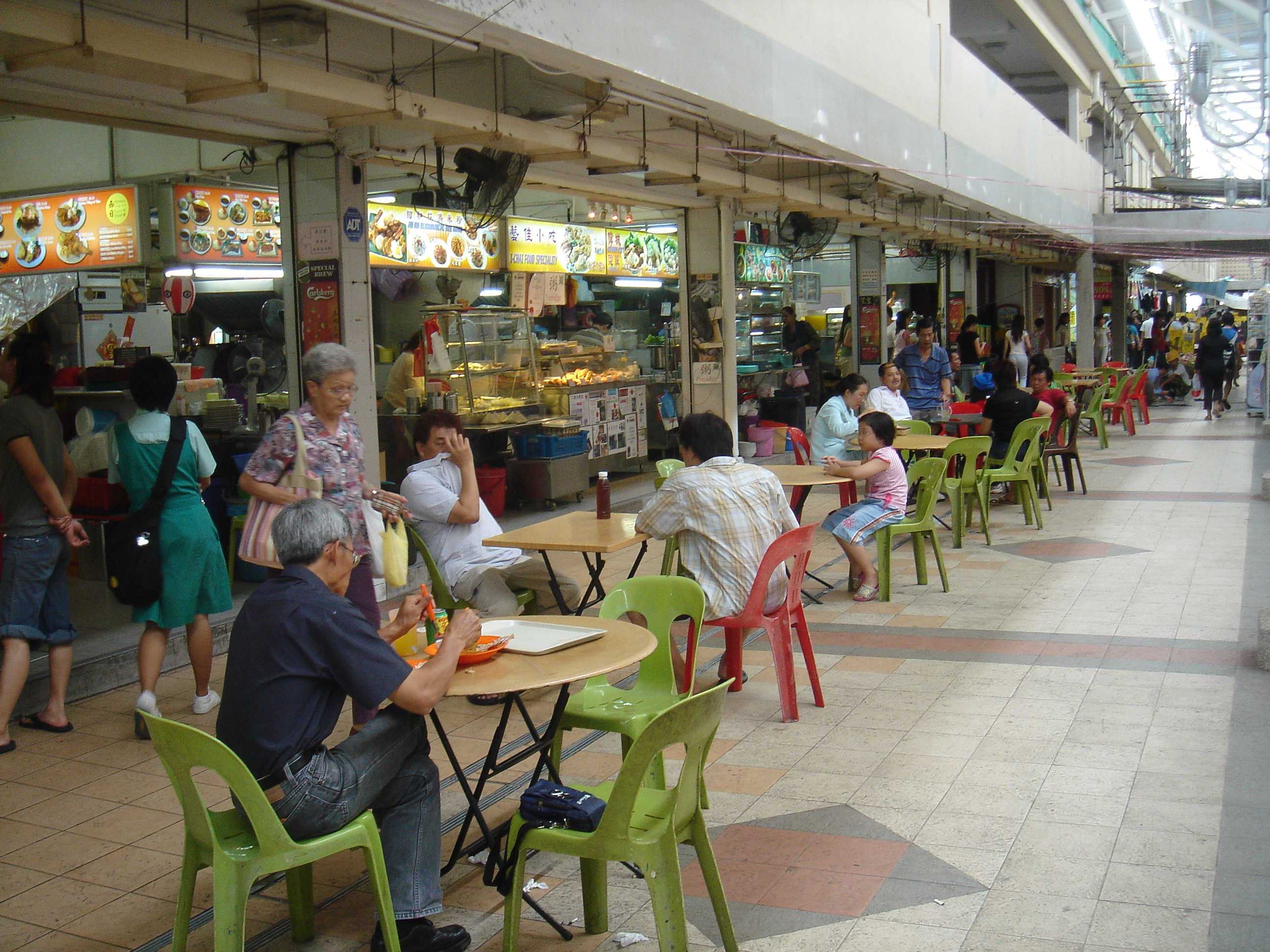
An open-air kopi tiam in Bendemeer, Singapore

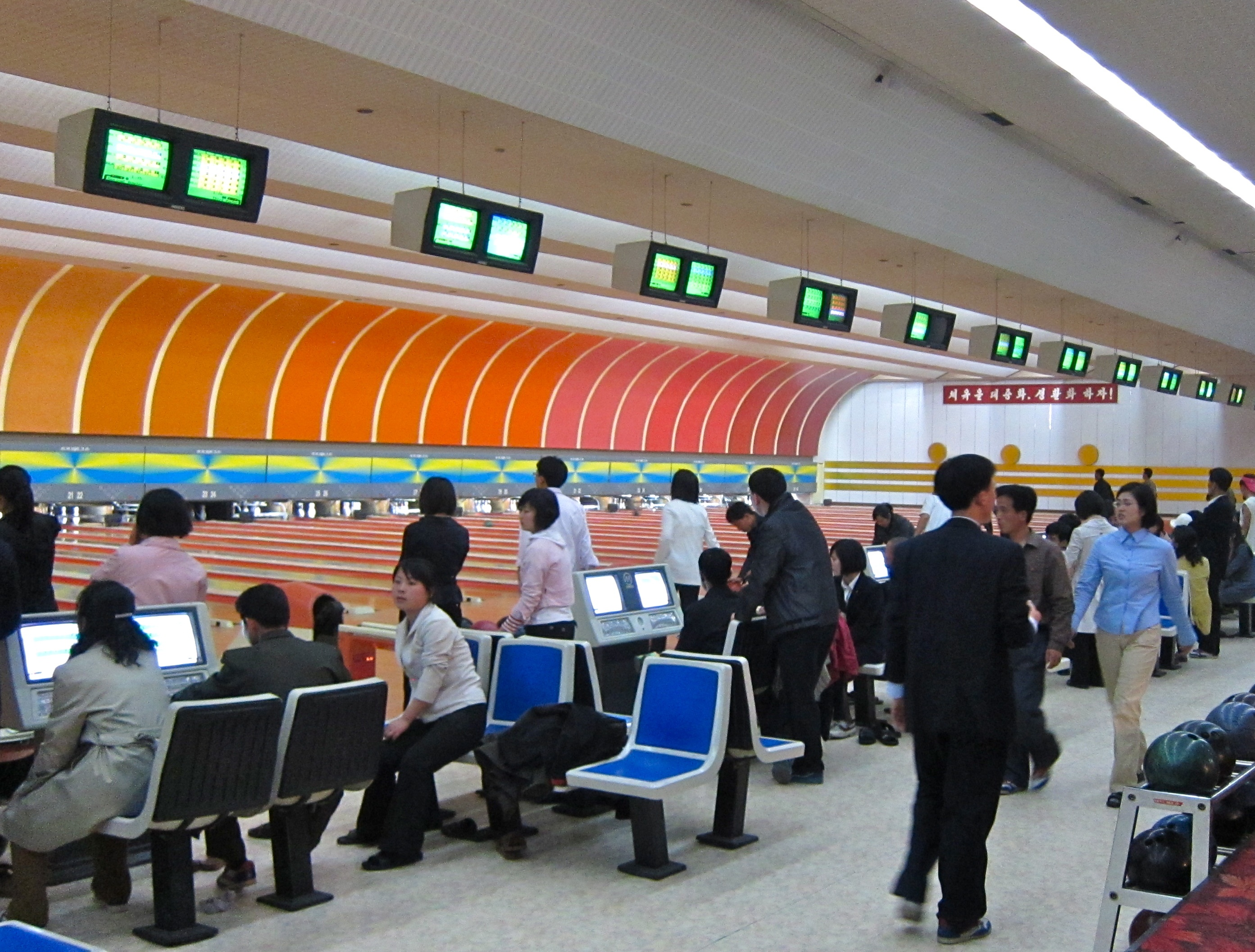
A bowling alley in Pyongyang, North Korea

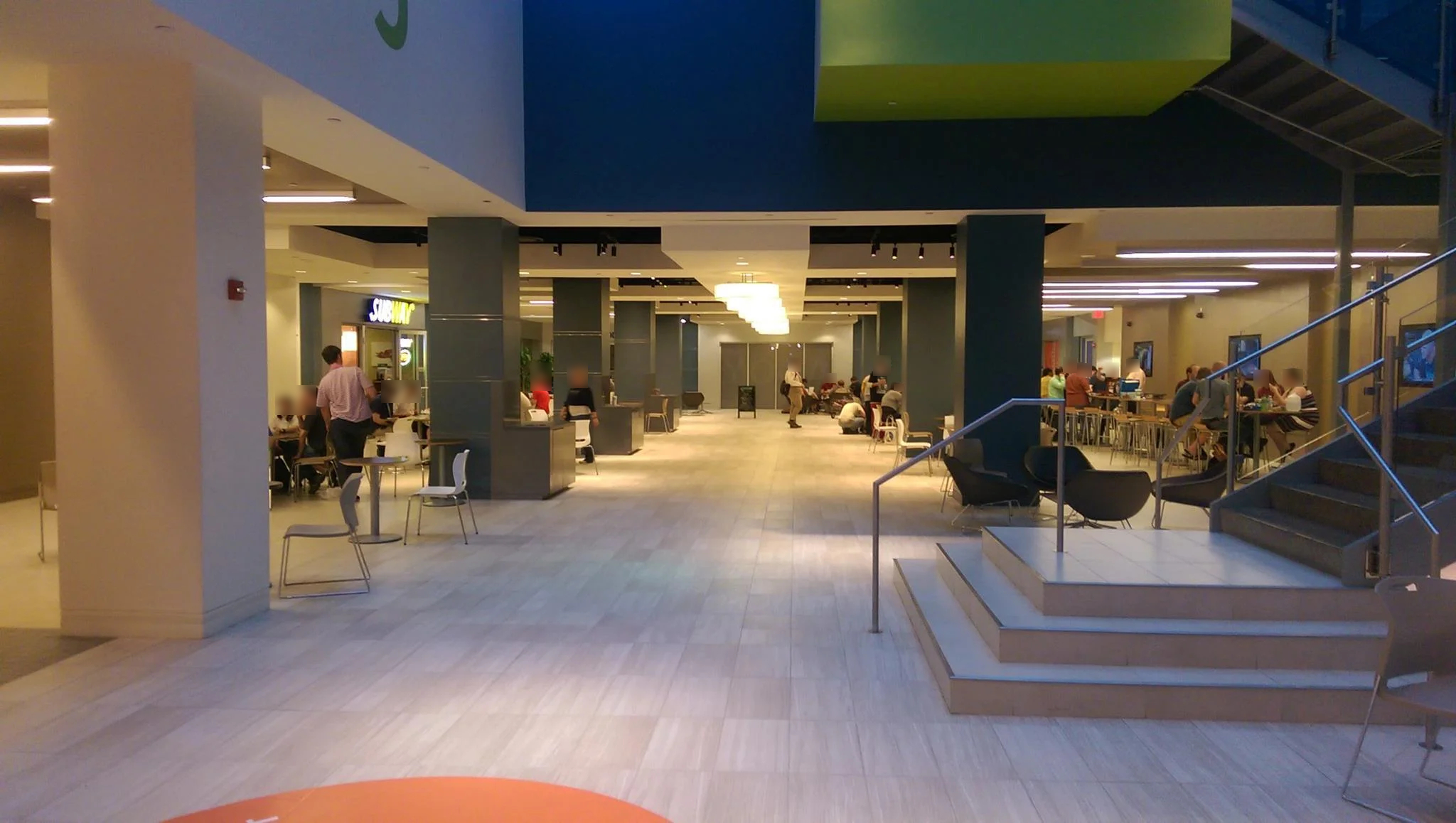
Community space in Crystal City Underground in Crystal City, Virginia, United States

One criteria for a third place, according to Jeffres et al. (2009), is that it "offers stress relief from the everyday demands of both home and work. It provides the feeling of inclusiveness and belonging associated with participating in a group's social activities, without the rigidity of policy or exclusiveness of club or organization membership".

In their research, many types of environments were listed as possible third places. These included community centers like YMCAs and YWCAs; senior centers; shopping centers like coffee shops, malls, and barber shops; religious places; schools; outdoor recreative activities (parks, neighborhood parties); and various media such as the World Wide Web and newspapers.

Ray Oldenburg observed that, while many third places such as public parks are completely free, they often tend to be commercial establishments. However, Oldenburg emphasized that chain establishments run by large corporations are "less hardy" third places than local, independently owned establishments, as they divert (cash) flow away from the local community to distant owners.

The concept of a "third place" has been picked up by various small businesses, including as a name for various locally owned coffee shops, and is commonly cited in urban planning literature on the issue of community-oriented business development and public space.

As the concept of "third place" has become more popular, several coworking office spaces have embraced this concept as the basis of their interior design.

Variants of the concept include the "community coffee house" and the "community living room," a term which has been adopted by several organizations to describe the model of a cooperatively-run "third space" which includes commercial or non-commercial functions with an emphasis on providing a free space for social interaction.

The general store or pub and occasionally bookstore or diner are traditional variants of the concept, provided there is an emphasis on socialization, and customers are invited to stay and "hang out" with or without making any (or additional) purchases. Institutions which traditionally provided some functions of a third place included shared leisure facilities such as a bowling alley or arcade, function halls, lodges or social clubs, when and if facilities were available for casual use.

A church community fills this role for many people, including groups that focus on common interests, favorites, and hobbies, as well as offering a consistent environment for social integration that extends beyond the domestic or professional spheres. For the most of this, these settings provide not only spiritual connection but also a structured hub for diverse groups organized around shared interests, volunteerism, and hobbies. Activities, events, and cell groups can build the connections that are necessary for authentic community.

=== Virtual third places ===
Since Oldenburg's writings, people in the computer and internet industry have declared that third places are observed or shifting to the virtual world or virtual third places. This descriptive practice is easily adopted because of the similarities in characteristics found between the virtual and physical worlds.

In combination with the Industrial Revolution, and as media transitioned from the public space to more comfortable roles inside one's home, there was a large shift away from public activities. With the advent of the internet, these virtual third places have been observed in online communities. Characteristics observed in these communities vary from their physical application but meet the context of personalization, permeability, approachability, and comfort.

With the increasing popularity of online multiplayer video games, individuals from across the world are becoming more connected with each other through these video games. The potential for social culture clashes is inherently high considering the large volume of interactions of users from different cultures. However, the online virtual communities constructed within these games share the same characteristics as traditional third places. One of the more prominent features of these communities is the social equalizing aspect. These games allow users to interact through their in-game character, or avatar, which serve as a medium for the player and removes the players' social identifiers. Avatars often interact via built-in text chat systems, allowing users to communicate without revealing their identity through their voice. Therefore, any type of social identification is dependent upon the avatar, not the actual player.

While these online communities provide freedom from traditional social status, that is not to say there are no social hierarchies within the games; each game community constructs their own social norms that determine in-game social status. However, each player begins the game at an equal footing and must achieve social recognition through their in-game accomplishments. The concept of "regulars" within third spaces is also prominent in online gaming communities. These regulars are often identifiable through some type of special identifier; some games include special insignia or titles for accomplished users, making these users stand out to all users. The regulars set standards for accepted in-game behavior, serving as a type of social moderator (especially for new players). For instance, many of these games offer the opportunity for PvP (player vs player) combat, in which users battle against each other. However, this creates an opportunity for users to "grief" one another, which is intentional harassment meant to disrupt gameplay for other users. This type of behavior is often kept in check by the community regulars. "Regular" status is attainable for all users, which furthers the sense of community within the game. As users play more, they are accepted into the community by fellow regulars, forming new social bonds.

As online technologies advance, these online video games become more accessible to individuals across all backgrounds. While these games are often played on traditional video game consoles or on PCs (which often requires purchasing the video game software), there are many web browser based games (such as RuneScape and Farmville) that allow anyone with Internet access to play for free. This widens the variety of individuals that are entering into the community.

== Internet access ==
Many workers in the United States conduct remote work, not from home, but from a third place. Remote work can cause isolation and working in public spaces, such as cafes, libraries or coworking areas, may be a happy medium between the home office and the corporate office. Availability of public Wi-Fi has been a major enabler of this trend.

A third place which provides internet access may create a hollow effect in that the patrons are physically present but do not make social contact with each other, being absorbed by their remote connections. This is similar to how patrons behave in learning commons environments like those in university libraries where the preponderance of socializing is among people who already know each other. Some businesses, like Nomad Café in Oakland, California are trying to ameliorate this effect by staging performance art such as live jazz and asking patrons to share information about themselves with other patrons via an online survey to encourage audience engagement.

== Social and health impacts ==
Recent scholarship has described third places as part of a community's social infrastructure as well as informal gathering spaces. Researchers have argued that the closure of neighborhood third places can reduce opportunities for social support, belonging, and everyday interaction, with consequences for collective health and well-being. Other studies have found that access to third places is unevenly distributed, with higher-poverty communities often having fewer such spaces and rural residents reporting disparities in both access and meaningful use.

== Fourth and fifth places ==
Morisson (2018) argues that places in the knowledge economy are evolving. He argues for the existence of a fourth place. In the knowledge economy, the rise of new social environments is blurring the conventional separation between the first place (home), the second place (work), and the third place. New social environments in the knowledge city can combine elements of the first and second place (coliving); of the second and third place (coworking); and of the first and third place (comingling). Furthermore, the combination of elements of the first, second, and third place in new social environments implies the emergence of a new place, the fourth place.

As the fourth place only works in the normal living mode, during COVID-19 quarantine restrictions, a new hybrid place emerged from the operation of the different outdoor and indoor typologies of other places. This place sometimes works on a physical basis, and other times virtually, with some essential characteristics needed to work properly during the pandemic outbreak. The limit of this place is the attached quarantine semi-private or semi-public space, which can be called "quarantined fourth place" or "fifth place".

== See also ==
- Cheers, American sitcom focusing on a neighborhood bar as a third place
- Coffeehouse (event)
- Fiscal localism
- Living street
- Hybridity
- Border
- Urban planning
- Urban sociology
- Urban vitality
