= Balslev =

Balslev may refer to:

- Balslev, Ejby, a Danish parish in Ejby Municipality

== People with the surname ==
- Anindita Balslev (fl. 2023), Scholar of religion based in India and Netherlands
- Harald Balslev (1867-1952), Danish writer and composer
- Lisbeth Balslev (born 1945), Danish operatic soprano

== See also ==
- Balsley, a surname
