= List of countries by Global Militarization Index =

Global Militarization Index 2014

This list of countries by Global Militarization Index is based on the 2022 Global Militarization Index of the Bonn International Center for Conversion.

== 2022 list ==
Rank	Country	Global Militarization Index (GMI)	Military Expenditure Index Score	People Index Score	Heavy Weapons Index Score
1	Ukraine	335	5.11	1.29	1.75
2	Israel	257	2.15	1.77	3.06
3	Armenia	223	2.00	1.79	2.28
4	Qatar	220	2.99	0.77	2.23
5	Bahrain	215	1.92	0.65	2.68
6	Saudi Arabia	213	2.94	0.74	2.11
7	Greece	211	1.89	1.13	2.71
8	Singapore	210	1.70	1.27	2.72
9	Azerbaijan	204	2.37	0.93	2.26
10	Russia	204	2.05	1.06	2.45
11	Lebanon	204	1.84	1.20	2.51
12	Kuwait	204	2.24	0.65	2.64
13	Oman	203	2.47	0.99	2.05
14	Jordan	200	2.26	0.99	2.18
15	Korea, Republic of	192	1.61	1.43	2.19
16	Brunei	190	1.84	1.47	1.86
17	Cyprus	182	1.25	1.05	2.66
18	Algeria	178	2.31	0.83	1.70
19	Belarus	174	0.97	1.49	2.27
20	Morocco	168	2.08	0.97	1.52
21	Lithuania	162	1.55	1.01	1.84
22	Botswana	160	1.69	0.81	1.87
23	Cambodia	160	1.39	1.62	1.34
24	Togo	156	2.49	1.02	0.75
25	United States	154	1.70	0.42	2.07
26	Finland	152	1.19	0.68	2.28
27	Serbia	149	1.44	0.29	1.92
28	Iran	147	1.67	0.87	1.49
29	Estonia	144	1.39	0.59	1.94
30	Mongolia	143	0.59	0.78	2.53
31	Chad	141	1.79	1.13	0.92
32	Namibia	139	1.69	0.96	1.14
33	Mauritania	139	1.67	1.08	1.04
34	Myanmar	138	1.89	1.09	0.79
35	Iraq	137	1.26	1.18	1.31
36	Romania	137	1.25	0.66	1.83
37	South Sudan	137	1.84	1.52	0.38
38	Croatia	137	1.41	0.46	1.87
39	Egypt	136	0.94	1.06	1.70
40	Uruguay	135	1.27	0.52	1.89
41	Turkey	135	1.04	0.70	1.94
42	Montenegro	134	1.11	0.96	1.59
43	Georgia	131	1.07	0.57	1.94
44	Pakistan	130	1.88	0.62	1.06
45	Tunisia	128	1.58	0.57	1.35
46	Poland	127	1.54	0.34	1.61
47	Norway	127	1.14	0.46	1.88
48	Sri Lanka	123	1.18	1.39	0.79
49	Congo, Republic of	123	1.38	0.93	1.05
50	Angola	122	1.20	0.93	1.20
51	Burundi	121	1.68	1.09	0.55
52	France	118	1.25	0.46	1.53
53	Mali	118	1.83	0.85	0.56
54	Kyrgyzstan	118	1.16	0.39	1.68
55	Chile	117	1.24	0.58	1.39
56	Australia	116	1.25	0.24	1.69
57	Switzerland	114	0.65	0.32	2.16
58	Bulgaria	114	1.10	0.50	1.53
59	Gabon	114	1.11	0.61	1.39
60	Guinea-Bissau	112	1.15	0.73	1.18
61	Slovakia	111	1.24	0.31	1.50
62	Sweden	111	0.97	0.12	1.94
63	Thailand	110	1.00	0.88	1.12
64	Latvia	110	1.37	0.42	1.21
65	Italy	109	1.17	0.51	1.31
66	Colombia	109	1.72	0.81	0.45
67	Denmark	109	1.03	0.31	1.64
68	Sudan	107	0.90	0.86	1.16
69	Slovenia	106	0.92	0.33	1.67
70	United Kingdom	106	1.37	0.26	1.28
71	Venezuela	106	0.65	1.14	1.11
72	Rwanda	103	1.09	0.97	0.77
73	Uganda	102	1.52	0.58	0.68
74	Hungary	102	1.13	0.36	1.29
75	Niger	101	1.22	1.23	0.33
76	Burkina Faso	101	1.79	0.54	0.45
77	Bolivia	100	1.10	0.81	0.85
78	Portugal	100	0.99	0.43	1.31
79	India	99	1.79	0.48	0.44
80	Czech Republic	98	1.01	0.23	1.45
81	Spain	96	1.05	0.38	1.21
82	Peru	96	0.94	0.63	1.06
83	Senegal	94	1.21	0.76	0.63
84	Equatorial Guinea	93	0.99	0.4	1.17
85	Netherlands	92	1.10	0.24	1.19
86	El Salvador	91	0.99	0.75	0.77
87	Central African Republic	91	1.18	1.00	0.34
88	Belgium	91	0.90	0.18	1.43
89	Guinea	90	1.50	0.49	0.49
90	Ecuador	90	1.39	0.36	0.72
91	Kazakhstan	88	0.54	0.35	1.54
92	Nicaragua	87	0.49	0.43	1.47
93	Bosnia and Herzegovina	87	0.69	0.18	1.29
94	Canada	87	0.93	0.25	1.21
95	Malaysia	86	0.88	0.48	1.01
96	Moldova	86	0.32	0.39	1.66
97	Austria	85	0.65	0.32	1.38
98	Germany	85	1.00	0.22	1.13
99	Ethiopia	84	0.87	1.19	0.26
100	Luxembourg	83	0.66	0.20	1.44
101	Mozambique	81	1.11	0.46	0.65
102	Albania	80	1.17	0.36	0.68
103	China	80	1.21	0.24	0.75
104	Fiji	78	1.18	0.26	0.50
105	Cameroon	74	0.89	0.70	0.47
106	Swaziland	73	1.21	0.00	0.00
107	Honduras	73	1.10	0.61	0.30
108	Nepal	73	0.96	0.62	0.43
109	Zimbabwe	72	0.47	0.92	0.59
110	Zambia	70	0.98	0.40	0.57
111	Afghanistan	70	1.17	0.75	0.01
112	Tanzania	69	0.99	0.66	0.27
113	Jamaica	68	1.03	0.53	0.33
114	Brazil	68	0.83	0.48	0.57
115	New Zealand	68	0.91	0.20	0.77
116	South Africa	68	0.65	0.31	0.92
117	Japan	68	0.84	0.26	0.77
118	Bangladesh	68	1.09	0.36	0.43
119	Benin	67	0.63	0.89	0.33
120	Tajikistan	63	0.83	0.10	0.64
121	Cote D'Ivoire	62	0.84	0.58	0.30
122	Dominican Republic	60	0.68	0.77	0.22
123	Kenya	59	0.90	0.35	0.40
124	Indonesia	59	0.71	0.53	0.40
125	Paraguay	59	0.72	0.61	0.31
126	Gambia	59	0.75	0.88	0.00
127	Liberia	58	0.96	0.60	0.04
128	Lesotho	58	1.04	0.33	0.22
129	Philippines	56	0.86	0.34	0.36
130	Seychelles	56	1.07	0.49	0.00
131	Malawi	55	0.61	0.77	0.14
132	Argentina	55	0.39	0.23	0.90
133	Guyana	54	0.55	0.58	0.38
134	Belize	53	0.75	0.73	0.00
135	Nigeria	53	0.66	0.39	0.43
136	Mexico	50	0.57	0.34	0.48
137	Sierra Leone	50	0.55	0.77	0.07
138	Congo, Democratic Republic of the	50	0.59	0.50	0.30
139	Timor-Leste	45	0.87	0.40	0.00
140	Guatemala	45	0.46	0.43	0.37
141	Madagascar	45	0.65	0.47	0.13
142	Ireland	45	0.24	0.17	0.84
143	Ghana	41	0.38	0.38	0.37
144	Cape Verde	34	0.53	0.44	0.00
145	Trinidad and Tobago	34	0.64	0.32	0.00
146	Papua New Guinea	33	0.40	0.55	0.00
147	Mauritius	33	0.18	0.25	0.51
148	Malta	26	0.46	0.29	0.00
149	Haiti	4	0.09	0.07	0.00

== See also ==
- Arms industry
- Military budget
