= International rankings of Iceland =

The following are international rankings of Iceland.

== Current ranking ==
Organisation	Name	Place	Out of	Year	Ref
Central Intelligence Agency	Life Expectancy (The World Factbook)	7	227	2022	
Economist Intelligence Unit	The Economist Democracy Index	4	167	2024	
Fund for Peace	Fragile States Index	177	179	2024	
New Economics Foundation	Happy Planet Index	58	147	2021	
Institute for Economics and Peace	Global Peace Index	1	163	2024	
Reporters Without Borders	World Press Freedom Index	17	180	2025	
Save the Children	Children's Index Rank	7	164	2011	
Save the Children	Mothers' Index Rank	4	178	2014	
Save the Children	Women's Index Rank	5	164	2011	
Transparency International	Corruption Perceptions Index	19	180	2023	
United Nations Development Programme	Human Development Index	1	193	2025	
United Nations Development Programme	Inequality-adjusted Human Development Index	1	169	2025	
Yale University / Columbia University	Environmental Performance Index	10	180	2022	
Wall Street Journal / Heritage Foundation	Index of Economic Freedom	13	177	2023	
World Bank	Ease of Doing Business Index	26	190	2020	
World Economic Forum	The Global Gender Gap Report	1	136	2013	
World Economic Forum	The Global Competitiveness Report	31	148	2013–2014	
World Intellectual Property Organization	Global Innovation Index	26	139	2026	
