= Mexico Peace Index =

Mexican think tank

The Mexico Peace Index (MPI) is one in a series of National Peace Indices produced by the Institute for Economics and Peace (IEP). The MPI provides a comprehensive measure of peacefulness in Mexico, the fifth edition of the MPI was released in 2017. The report is released in both Spanish and English, and analyzes the economic benefits that would occur from increases in peace, and provides an estimate relating to the economic impact violence has had on Mexico.

The Index uses the same definition of peace as the Global Peace Index, United States Peace Index and United Kingdom Peace Index, which it defines as the absence of violence or the absence of the fear of violence.

Each year a large press conference is held and attended by many civil society reps, including INEGI, COMCE, Coparmex, FEMSA, Mexico Evalua, Mexico Contra la Delincuencia. Additionally the press conferences are attended by journalists from multiple media outlets including the Wall Street Journal, AFP, EFE, Xinhua, NY Times, Telemundo, Reforma, El Universal, El Economista, TV Azteca, Milenio TV, Expansion, Radio Formula, MVS Radio, W Radio, Notimex. Each year the launch of the report generates wide spread domestic media coverage, with 500 media pieces covering the 2017 launch.

== 2017 report ==
The most peaceful states in the 2017 MPI report:

| State | Rank | Score |
|---|---|---|
| Yucatán | 1 | 1.239 |
| Nayarit | 2 | 1.384 |
| Tlaxcala | 3 | 1.403 |
| Hidalgo | 4 | 1.445 |
| Coahuila | 5 | 1.515 |

Least peaceful states in the 2017 MPI report :

| State | Rank | Score |
|---|---|---|
| Baja California | 28 | 3.010 |
| Baja California Sur | 29 | 3.195 |
| Sinaloa | 30 | 3.274 |
| Colima | 31 | 3.734 |
| Guerrero | 32 | 3.927 |

The 2017 MPI Expert Panel:

- Edgar Guerrero Centeno Deputy Director General of Government Information Policies and National Government Censuses, Instituto Nacional de Estadística y Geografía (INEGI)
- Guillermo Zepeda Lecuona Director, Jurimetría, Iniciativas para el Estado de Derecho, A.C.
- Leonel Fernández Novelo Local Observatories Coordinator, Observatorio Nacional Ciudadano
- Juan Pablo Arango Orozco Researcher, Causa en Común
- Alberto Díaz-Cayeros Senior Fellow, Center for Democracy Development and Rule of Law, Freeman Spogli Institute of International Affairs, Stanford University
- Jonathan Furszyfer del Río Director of Security, México Evalúa

== Indicators ==
The Mexico Peace Index uses five indicators to measure peace at the state level: detention without a sentence, homicides, violent crimes, weapons crimes, and organized crime.
