= International rankings of Bosnia and Herzegovina =

These are the international rankings of Bosnia and Herzegovina.

== International rankings ==
Organization	Survey	Ranking
Institute for Economics and Peace	Global Peace Index	71 out of 162
Reporters Without Borders	Worldwide Press Freedom Index 2013	68 out of 179
The Heritage Foundation/The Wall Street Journal	Index of Economic Freedom 2010^{[unfit]}	110 out of 179
Transparency International	Corruption Perceptions Index 2012	72 out of 174
United Nations Development Programme	Human Development Index 2012	81 out of 187
Networked Readiness Index	Networked Readiness Index 2008–2009	106 out of 134
World Intellectual Property Organization	Global Innovation Index, 2026	84 out of 139
