= International rankings of North Macedonia =

This is a list of International rankings of North Macedonia

Organisation	Survey	Ranking
Institute for Economics and Peace	Global Peace Index 2019	65 out of 163
Reporters Without Borders	Worldwide Press Freedom Index 2019	95 out of 180
The Heritage Foundation/The Wall Street Journal	Index of Economic Freedom 2019	33 out of 180
Transparency International	Corruption Perceptions Index 2019	106 out of 180
United Nations Development Programme	Human Development Index 2019	82 out of 189
World Bank	Ease of doing business index 2019	10 out of 190
World Intellectual Property Organization	Global Innovation Index, 2026	61 out of 139
