= Middle East and North Africa =

Geographic region

Middle East and North Africa West Asia and North Africa
- How often countries/territories are included in MENA/WANA definitions: Usually included Often included Less commonly included
- Area: 12,251,418 km^{2} (4,730,299 sq mi) (Note: West Asia and North Africa: 12,437,461 km^{2} (4,802,131 sq mi) (Numbers come from the listed countries in the infobox))
- Population: ▲635,973,527 (Note: West Asia and North Africa: 635,973,527 (Numbers come from the listed countries in the infobox))
- Population density: 51.9 per/km²
- GDP (PPP): ▲$17.25 trillion
- GDP (nominal): ▲$6.9 trillion
- GDP per capita: ▲$10,892
- Demonym: Middle Eastern and North African; West Asian and North African
- Countries: List (Note: This list only includes countries that are included in common definitions of the Middle East/West Asia and North Africa. For other countries that some organizations consider to be part of MENA/WANA, see Definitions.): Algeria; Armenia (Note: Included when West Asia and North Africa is used.); Azerbaijan; Bahrain; Cyprus; Egypt; Georgia; Iran; Iraq; Israel; Jordan; Kuwait; Lebanon; Libya; Morocco; Oman; Palestine; Qatar; Saudi Arabia; Syria; Tunisia; Turkey; United Arab Emirates; Yemen
- Languages: Arabic, Persian, Turkish, Kurdish, Hebrew, Berber, Coptic, Azerbaijani, Georgian, Armenian
- Time zone: UTC+01:00 to UTC+04:00
- Largest cities: Largest cities: # (Egypt) Cairo; 1. (Iran) Tehran; 2. (Turkey) Istanbul; 3. (Iraq) Baghdad; 4. (Saudi Arabia) Riyadh; 5. (Turkey) Ankara; 6. (Egypt) Alexandria; 7. (United Arab Emirates) Dubai; 8. (Saudi Arabia) Jeddah; 9. (Jordan) Amman

The Middle East and North Africa (MENA), also referred to as West Asia and North Africa (WANA) or South West Asia and North Africa (SWANA), is a geographic region which comprises the Middle East (also called West Asia) and North Africa together. It exists as an alternative to the concept of the Greater Middle East, which comprises the bulk of the Muslim world. The region has no standardized definition and groupings may vary, but the term typically includes countries like Algeria, Bahrain, Egypt, Iraq, Israel, Jordan, Kuwait, Lebanon, Libya, Morocco, Oman, Palestine, Qatar, Saudi Arabia, Syria, Tunisia, the United Arab Emirates, and Yemen.

As a regional identifier, the term "MENA" is often used in academia, military planning, disaster relief, media planning (as a broadcast region), and business writing. Moreover, it shares a number of cultural, economic, and environmental similarities across the countries that it spans; for example, some of the most extreme impacts of climate change will be felt in MENA.

Some related terms have a wider definition than MENA, such as MENASA (lit. 'Middle East and North Africa and South Asia'), MENACA (Middle East, North Africa, and Central Asia; historically heavily influenced by Zoroastrianism, Islam and Turco-Iranian tradition; the U.S. has a Foreign Relations Subcommittee dedicated to it)) or MENAP (lit. 'Middle East and North Africa and Afghanistan and Pakistan'). The term MENAT explicitly includes Turkey, which is usually excluded from some MENA definitions, although Turkey is almost always considered part of the Middle East proper.

Ultimately, MENA can be considered as a grouping scheme that brings together most of the Arab League and variously includes their neighbors, like Iran, Turkey, Israel, Cyprus, the Caucasian countries, Afghanistan, Pakistan, Malta, and a few others.

Since July 1, 2025, the World Bank has used MENAAP (Middle East, North Africa, Afghanistan, and Pakistan) to include Afghanistan and Pakistan in the Middle East and North Africa region.

== Definitions ==
The Middle East and North Africa has no standardized definition; different organizations define the region as consisting of different territories, or do not define it as a region at all.

Variations on definitions of the Middle East and North Africa region. Traditional definition of the Middle East Greater Middle East (2004 U.S. Government paper) Areas pundits sometimes associated with the Middle East around 2004

=== United Nations ===
The MENA region as defined by the World Bank (2003)

The MENA region as defined by UNAIDS, which includes Sudan and Somalia, but excludes Israel, Palestine and Malta

The MENA region as defined by the IMF (2003), which includes Afghanistan, Mauritania, Pakistan, Palestine, Sudan and Somalia, but excludes Israel and Malta

There is no MENA region amongst the United Nations Regional Groups, nor in the United Nations geoscheme used by the UNSD (though the latter does feature two subregions called 'Western Asia' and 'Northern Africa', see WANA). Some agencies and programmes of the United Nations do define the MENA region, but their definitions may contradict each other, and sometimes only apply to specific studies or reports.

- A 2003 World Bank study stated: "In World Bank geographic classification, the following 21 countries or territories constitute the Middle East and North Africa (MENA) region: six Gulf Cooperation Council (GCC) members (Bahrain, Kuwait, Oman, Qatar, Saudi Arabia, and United Arab Emirates [UAE]), and 15 other countries or territories: Algeria, Djibouti, the Arab Republic of Egypt, Iraq, the Islamic Republic of Iran, Israel, Jordan, Lebanon, Libya, Malta, Morocco, the Republic of Yemen, the Syrian Arab Republic, Tunisia, and West Bank and Gaza." As of January 2021, the World Bank website groups the same set of 21 countries/territories as MENA: "Algeria; Bahrain; Djibouti; Egypt, Arab Rep.; Iran, Islamic Rep.; Iraq; Israel; Jordan; Kuwait; Lebanon; Libya; Malta; Morocco; Oman; Qatar; Saudi Arabia; Syrian Arab Republic; Tunisia; United Arab Emirates; West Bank and Gaza; Yemen, Rep..".
- A 2010 UNHCR report stated: "For the purposes of this study, the MENA region has been defined as comprising of the following 18 countries: Algeria, Bahrain, Egypt, Iraq, Jordan, Kuwait, Lebanon, Libya, Mauritania, Morocco, Oman, Occupied Palestinian Territories, Qatar, Saudi Arabia, Syria, Tunisia, United Arab Emirates and Yemen."
- A 2015 FAO report stated: "The 21 [sic] MENA countries are Algeria, Bahrain, Djibouti, Egypt, Iran, Israel, Jordan, Kuwait, Lebanon, Libya, Malta, Morocco, Oman, Palestine, Qatar, Saudi Arabia, Syria, Tunisia, United Arab Emirates and Yemen." (Note: Only 20 MENA countries are listed in the FAO report; however, the corresponding section uses World Bank sources which typically include Iraq, and mentions the country multiple times.)
- The UNAIDS regional classification of the Middle East and North Africa region "includes 20 countries/territories: Algeria, Bahrain, Djibouti, Egypt, Iran, Iraq, Jordan, Kuwait, Lebanon, Libya, Morocco, Oman, Qatar, Saudi Arabia, Somalia, Sudan, Syrian Arab Republic, Tunisia, United Arab Emirates and Yemen", according to a 2019 UNICEF report.
- As of January 2021, the UNICEF website groups the following set of 20 countries as MENA: "Algeria, Bahrain, Djibouti, Egypt, Iran (Islamic Republic of), Iraq, Jordan, Kuwait, Lebanon, Libya, Morocco, Oman, Qatar, Saudi Arabia, State of Palestine, Sudan, Syrian Arab Republic, Tunisia, United Arab Emirates, Yemen."
- Working for the International Monetary Fund (IMF), economists Hamid Reza Davoodi and George T. Abed wrote in 2003: "The MENA region comprises the Arab States in the Middle East and North Africa—Algeria, Bahrain, Djibouti, Egypt, Iraq, Jordan, Kuwait, Lebanon, Libya, Mauritania, Morocco, Oman, Qatar, Saudi Arabia, Somalia, Sudan, the Syrian Arab Republic, Tunisia, the United Arab Emirates, and Yemen—plus the Islamic State of Afghanistan, the Islamic Republic of Iran, Pakistan, the West Bank and Gaza." The authors emphasise that these "24 MENA countries (...) are grouped together for analytical purposes only." Although they allegedly "share common challenges and cultural links distinct from neighbouring economies" such as Israel and Turkey, and Islam is the dominant religion and Arabic the principal language, there are "sizable religious minority groups" and "significant linguistic diversities" in the MENA region, with Afghanistan, Iran and Pakistan not having Arabic as the majority language.

MENA definitions by United Nations agencies and programmes
Country or territory	World Bank MENA 2003	FAO MENA 2015	UNAIDS MENA 2019	UNICEF MENA 2021	UNHCR MENA 2010	IMF MENA 2003	UNSD WA+NA
Afghanistan	No	No	No	No	No	Yes	No
Algeria	Yes	Yes	Yes	Yes	Yes	Yes	Yes
Armenia	No	No	No	No	No	No	Yes
Azerbaijan	No	No	No	No	No	No	Yes
Bahrain	Yes	Yes	Yes	Yes	Yes	Yes	Yes
Cyprus	No	No	No	No	No	No	Yes
Djibouti	Yes	Yes	Yes	Yes	No	Yes	No
Egypt	Yes	Yes	Yes	Yes	Yes	Yes	Yes
Georgia	No	No	No	No	No	No	Yes
Iran	Yes	Yes	Yes	Yes	No	Yes	No
Iraq	Yes	Unclear	Yes	Yes	Yes	Yes	Yes
Israel	Yes	Yes	No	No	No	No	Yes
Jordan	Yes	Yes	Yes	Yes	Yes	Yes	Yes
Kuwait	Yes	Yes	Yes	Yes	Yes	Yes	Yes
Lebanon	Yes	Yes	Yes	Yes	Yes	Yes	Yes
Libya	Yes	Yes	Yes	Yes	Yes	Yes	Yes
Malta	Yes	Yes	No	No	Yes	No	No
Mauritania	No	No	No	No	Yes	Yes	No
Morocco	Yes	Yes	Yes	Yes	Yes	Yes	Yes
Oman	Yes	Yes	Yes	Yes	Yes	Yes	Yes
Pakistan	No	No	No	No	No	Yes	No
Palestine*	Yes	Yes	No	Yes	Yes	Yes	Yes
Qatar	Yes	Yes	Yes	Yes	Yes	Yes	Yes
Saudi Arabia	Yes	Yes	Yes	Yes	Yes	Yes	Yes
Somalia	No	No	Yes	No	No	Yes	No
Sudan	No	No	Yes	Yes	No	Yes	Yes
Syria	Yes	Yes	Yes	Yes	Yes	Yes	Yes
Tunisia	Yes	Yes	Yes	Yes	Yes	Yes	Yes
Turkey	No	No	No	No	No	No	Yes
United Arab Emirates	Yes	Yes	Yes	Yes	Yes	Yes	Yes
Western Sahara	Unclear	Unclear	Unclear	Unclear	Unclear	Unclear	Yes
Yemen	Yes	Yes	Yes	Yes	Yes	Yes	Yes
^{*}Also called State of Palestine, (Occupied) Palestinian Territories, Palestinian Authority, or West Bank and Gaza (Strip).

=== Other definitions ===
Historians Michael Dumper and Bruce Stanley stated in 2007: 'For the purposes of this volume, the editors have generally chosen to define the MENA region as stretching from Morocco to Iran and from Turkey to the Horn of Africa. This definition thus includes the twenty-two countries of the Arab League (including the Palestinian Authority enclaves in the West Bank and Gaza Strip), Turkey, Israel, Iran, and Cyprus.' They stressed, however, how controversial and problematic this definition is, and that other choices could also have been made according to various criteria.

For its December 2012 global religion survey, the Pew Research Center grouped 20 countries and territories as 'the Middle East and North Africa', namely: 'Algeria, Bahrain, Egypt, Iraq, Israel, Jordan, Kuwait, Lebanon, Libya, Morocco, Oman, the Palestinian territories, Qatar, Saudi Arabia, Sudan, Syria, Tunisia, United Arab Emirates, Western Sahara and Yemen.'

For the Global Peace Index 2020, the Institute for Economics & Peace defined the MENA region as containing 20 countries: Algeria, Bahrain, Egypt, Iraq, Iran, Israel, Jordan, Kuwait, Lebanon, Libya, Morocco, Oman, Palestine, Qatar, Saudi Arabia, Sudan, Syria, Tunisia, United Arab Emirates, and Yemen.

=== WANA ===
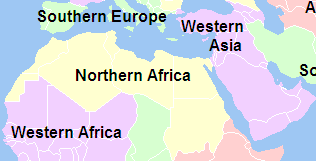
Western Asia and Northern Africa according to the UN political statistics geoscheme

Due to the geographic ambiguity and Eurocentric nature of the term "Middle East", some people, especially in sciences such as agriculture and climatology, prefer to use other terms like "SWANA" (South West Asia and North Africa), "WANA" (West Asia and North Africa), or the less common NAWA (North Africa-West Asia). Usage of the term WANA has also been advanced by postcolonial studies.

The United Nations geoscheme used by the UN Statistics Division for its specific political geography statistics needs, does not define a single WANA region, but it does feature two subregions called Western Asia and Northern Africa, respectively:

- Western Asia (18): Armenia, Azerbaijan, Bahrain, Cyprus, Georgia, Iraq, Israel, Jordan, Kuwait, Lebanon, Oman, Qatar, Saudi Arabia, State of Palestine, Syrian Arab Republic, Turkey, United Arab Emirates, Yemen.
- Northern Africa (7): Algeria, Egypt, Libya, Morocco, Sudan, Tunisia, Western Sahara.

The WANA region according to ICARDA (2011)

In a 1995 publication, the then-Aleppo-based International Center for Agricultural Research in the Dry Areas (ICARDA) defined its West Asia/North Africa (WANA) region as 25 countries, including: 'Afghanistan, Algeria, Egypt, Ethiopia, Iran, Iraq, Jordan, Lebanon, Libya, Morocco, Oman, Pakistan, Saudi Arabia, Sudan, Syria, Tunisia, Turkey and Yemen.' It noted that CGIAR's Technical Advisory Committee (TAC) excluded Ethiopia, Sudan and Pakistan from its 1992 WANA definition, but otherwise listed the same countries. In a 2011 study, ICARDA stated 27 countries/territories: 'The WANA region includes: Afghanistan, Algeria, Bahrain, Djibouti, Egypt, Eritrea, Ethiopia, Gaza Strip, Iran, Iraq, Jordan, Kuwait, Lebanon, Libya, Mauritania, Morocco, Oman, Pakistan, Qatar, Saudi Arabia, Somalia, Sudan, Syria, Tunisia, Turkey, United Arab Emirates, and Yemen.'

WANA definitions by (mostly agricultural) organisations
Country or territory	CGIAR WANA 1992	ICARDA WANA 1995	ICARDA WANA 2011
Afghanistan	Yes	Yes	Yes
Algeria	Yes	Yes	Yes
Armenia	No	No	No
Azerbaijan	No	No	No
Bahrain	Unclear	Unclear	Yes
Cyprus	No	No	No
Djibouti	Unclear	Unclear	Yes
Egypt	Yes	Yes	Yes
Eritrea	No	Probably	Yes
Ethiopia	No	Yes	Yes
Georgia	No	No	No
Iran	Yes	Yes	Yes
Iraq	Yes	Yes	Yes
Israel	Unclear	Unclear	No
Jordan	Yes	Yes	Yes
Kuwait	Yes	Yes	Yes
Lebanon	Yes	Yes	Yes
Libya	Yes	Yes	Yes
Mauritania	Unclear	Unclear	Yes
Malta	No	No	No
Morocco	Yes	Yes	Yes
Oman	Yes	Yes	Yes
Pakistan	No	Yes	Yes
Palestine*	Unclear	Unclear	Partial
Qatar	Yes	Yes	Yes
Saudi Arabia	Yes	Yes	Yes
Somalia	Unclear	Unclear	Yes
Sudan	No	Yes	Yes
Syria	Yes	Yes	Yes
Tunisia	Yes	Yes	Yes
Turkey	Yes	Yes	Yes
United Arab Emirates	Unclear	Unclear	Yes
Western Sahara	Unclear	Unclear	Unclear
Yemen	Yes	Yes	Yes

^{*}Also called State of Palestine, or West Bank and Gaza (Strip).

=== Other terms and definitions ===
==== Greater Middle East ====
In a preparatory working paper for the June 2004 G8 Summit, the U.S. government (at the end of the George W. Bush administration's first term) defined the Greater Middle East as including the Arab states, Israel, Turkey, Iran, Pakistan and Afghanistan.

==== MENAAP ====
On July 1, 2025, the World Bank moved Afghanistan and Pakistan from South Asia to the Middle East and North Africa region, using the term MENAAP (Middle East, North Africa, Afghanistan, and Pakistan) for the larger group.

==== MENAP ====
From April 2013, the International Monetary Fund started using a new analytical region called MENAP (Middle East, North Africa, Afghanistan, and Pakistan), which adds Afghanistan and Pakistan to MENA countries. Now MENAP is a prominent economic grouping in IMF reports.

==== MENASA ====
MENASA refers to the Middle East, North Africa and South Asia region. Its usage consists of the region of MENA together with South Asia, with Dubai chosen by the United Nations as the data hub for the region. In some contexts, specifically the Lauder Institute at the University of Pennsylvania, the region is abbreviated as SAMENA instead of the more common MENASA.

==== MENAT ====
The term MENAT (Middle East, North Africa, and Turkey) has been used to include Turkey in the list of MENA countries.

==== Near East ====
The term Near East was commonly used before the term Middle East was coined by the British in the early 20th century. The term Ancient Near East is commonly used by scholars for the region in antiquity. Some organisations and scholars insist on still using 'Near East' today, with some including North Africa, but definitions range widely and there is no consensus on its geographical application.

==== EMME ====
EMME refers to a grouping of 18 nations situated in and around the Eastern Mediterranean and Middle East. The 18 nations in the Eastern Mediterranean and Middle East are: Bahrain, Cyprus, Egypt, Greece, Iran, Iraq, Israel, Jordan, Kuwait, Lebanon, Oman, Palestine, Qatar, Saudi Arabia, Syria, Turkey, United Arab Emirates, and Yemen.

== Geography ==
=== Climate change ===
Climate classification maps for the Middle East at present (top) and predicted for North Africa for 2071–2100 under the most intense climate change scenario (bottom). Mid-range scenarios are currently considered more likely.

In 2018, the MENA region emitted 3.2 billion tonnes of carbon dioxide and produced 8.7% of global greenhouse gas emissions (GHG). These emissions are mostly from the energy sector, an integral component of many Middle Eastern and North African economies due to the extensive oil and natural gas reserves that are found within the region. The Middle East region is one of the most vulnerable to climate change. The impacts include an increase in drought conditions, aridity, heatwaves and sea level rise.

Sharp global temperature and sea level changes, shifting precipitation patterns and increased frequency of extreme weather events are some of the main impacts of climate change as identified by the Intergovernmental Panel on Climate Change (IPCC). The MENA region is especially vulnerable to such impacts due to its arid and semi-arid environment, facing climatic challenges such as low rainfall, high temperatures and dry soil. The climatic conditions that foster such challenges for MENA are projected by the IPCC to worsen throughout the 21st century. If greenhouse gas emissions are not significantly reduced, part of the MENA region risks becoming uninhabitable before the year 2100.

Climate change is expected to put significant strain on already scarce water and agricultural resources within the MENA region, threatening the national security and political stability of all included countries. Over 60 percent of the region's population lives in high and very high water-stressed areas compared to the global average of 35 percent. This has prompted some MENA countries to engage with the issue of climate change on an international level through environmental accords such as the Paris Agreement. Law and policy are also being established on a national level amongst MENA countries, with a focus on the development of renewable energies.

== Politics ==
=== Stability and instability in the region ===
In its Global Peace Index 2020, the Institute for Economics & Peace stated that 'the Middle East and North Africa remains the world's least peaceful region, despite improvements for 11 countries'. According to an in-depth multi-part study by the Center for Strategic and International Studies (CSIS) published in April 2016, the factors shaping the MENA region are exceedingly complex, and it is difficult to find 'any overall model that fits the different variables involved'. It found that there were 'deep structural causes of violence and instability'. Wars and upheavals are partly 'shaped by the major tribal, ethnic, sectarian, and regional differences', by 'demographic, economic, and security trends', and by 'quality of governance, internal security system, justice systems, and [social] progress.' In some countries, the necessary societal factors for successful democratic change (often championed by some in the region and in the West to address various issues) are absent, and political revolutions may not always lead to more stability, nor solve the underlying problems in a given MENA country. However, it also found that 'the majority of MENA nations have remained relatively stable and continue to make progress'.

=== Armed conflicts ===
During and after the decolonisation of Africa and Asia in the 20th century, many different armed conflicts have occurred in the MENA region, including but not limited to the Rif War; the Iraqi–Kurdish conflict; the Arab–Israeli conflict; the Western Sahara conflict; the Lebanese Civil War; the Kurdish–Turkish conflict (1978–present); the Iranian Revolution; the Iran–Iraq War; Iran–Saudi Arabia proxy conflict; the Berber Spring; the Toyota War; the Invasion of Kuwait and the Gulf War; the Algerian Civil War; the Iraqi Kurdish Civil War; the rise of terrorism and anti-terrorist actions; the U.S.-led intervention of Iraq in 2003 and subsequent Iraq War. The Arab Spring (2010–2011) led to the Tunisian Revolution, the Egyptian revolution of 2011 and Egyptian Crisis (2011–2014), while also sparking war throughout the region such as the Syrian Civil War, the Libyan Civil War, the Yemeni Civil War and the Iraqi war against ISIS (Islamic State of Iraq and the Levant). During the Sudanese Revolution, months of protests and a military coup led to the fall of Omar al-Bashir's regime and the initiation of the 2019–2022 Sudanese transition to democracy and the Sudanese peace process.

== Economy ==
The MENA region has vast reserves of petroleum and natural gas that make it a vital source of global economic stability. According to the Oil and Gas Journal (1 January 2009), the MENA region has 60% of the world's oil reserves (810.98 billion barrels (128.936 km^{3})) and 45% of the world's natural gas reserves ( 2,868,886 billion cubic feet (81,237.8 km^{3}) ).

As of 2023, 7 of the 13 OPEC nations are within the MENA region.

Investment also flows from the Middle East into North Africa, with research finding that bilateral trade between the United Arab Emirates and Africa had increased by more than 38% in the two years to the end of 2023.

== Demographics ==
Population pyramid of North Africa in 2023

The demographics of the Middle East and North Africa (MENA) region show a highly populated, culturally diverse region spanning three continents. As of 2023, the population was around 501 million. The class, cultural, ethnic, governmental, linguistic and religious make-up of the region is highly variable.

Debates on which countries should be included in the Middle East are wide-ranging. The Greater Middle East and North Africa region can include the Caucasus (Georgia, Armenia and Azerbaijan), Cyprus, Afghanistan and Pakistan due to various social, religious and historic ties. The most commonly accepted countries in the MENA region are included on this page.

According to Pew Research Center's 2016 "Religion and Education Around the World" study, 40% of the adult population in MENA had completed less than a year of primary school. The fraction was higher for women, of whom half had been to school for less than a year.

=== Religion ===
Islam is by far the dominant religion in nearly all of the MENA territories; 91.2% of the population is Muslim. The Middle East–North Africa region comprises 20 countries and territories with an estimated Muslim population of 315 million or about 23% of the world's Muslim population. The term "MENA" is often defined in part in relation to majority-Muslim countries located in the region, although several nations in the region are not Muslim-dominated. Major non-Islamic religions native here are Christianity, Judaism, Yazidism, Druzeism, African folk religions, Berberism and other Arab paganism.

Migrant population, mostly within the Gulf nations, practice mostly the beliefs they follow to, such as Buddhism and Hinduism among South Asian, East Asian and Southeast Asian migrants.

== Culture ==
=== Queer art ===
Some authors often define queer expression as challenging or rethinking societal norms about gender, sexuality, and identity. Recent artists describe queer art within Middle East and North Africa as a way to encompass a wide variety of different artistic practices and media, including performance, painting, installation, photography, video, sculpture, fiber arts, drawing, mixed media practices, and more. Authors note that artists from the region and its diaspora have explored how sexuality, identity, and culture connect in their works. Both regions are also referred to as South West Asia and North Africa (SWANA) to highlight the geography instead of the Eurocentric term ¨Middle East¨.

Several predominant themes emerge in the queer art of the Middle East and North Africa. Artists frequently explore gender identity, constructing binary interpretations of gender and creating non-normative expressions of gender, often through engagement with historical or archival material. Representations of sexuality, intimacy and diaspora are likewise frequent themes seen in queer art across the region.

== See also ==
- Northeast Africa
- Arab world
- Asia-Pacific
- Climate change in the Middle East and North Africa
- Demographics of the Middle East and North Africa
- Eastern Mediterranean and Middle East (EMME)
- Europe, the Middle East and Africa (EMEA)
- Fertile Crescent
- Greater Middle East
- Gulf Cooperation Council (GCC)
- List of country groupings
- Middle East economic integration
- Near East
- Sahel
