= Global Terrorism Index =

Indicator for impact of terrorism

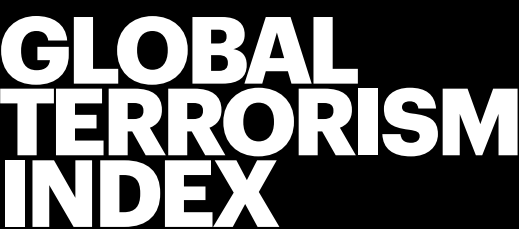
Logo

The Global Terrorism Index (GTI) is a report published annually by the Institute for Economics and Peace (IEP), and was developed by IT entrepreneur and IEP's founder Steve Killelea. The index provides a comprehensive summary of the key global trends and patterns in terrorism since 2000. It is an attempt to systematically rank the nations of the world according to terrorist activity. The index combines a number of factors associated with terrorist attacks to build an explicit picture of the impact of terrorism, illustrating trends, and providing a data series for analysis by researchers and policymakers. It produces a composite score in order to provide an ordinal ranking of countries on the impact of terrorism.

Early editions of the GTI were based on data from the Global Terrorism Database (GTD) which is collected and collated by the National Consortium for the Study of Terrorism and Responses to Terrorism (START) at the University of Maryland. The GTD has codified over 190,000 cases of terrorism, it covers 163 countries, consisting 99.7% of the world's population. The GTI no longer indicates that it relies on data from the GTD. The data behind the GTI are available to download from IEP, but there does not seem to be a codebook indicating what definition of terrorism is used to produce the data.

The GTI was developed in consultation with the Global Peace Index expert panel. The aim is to examine trends and to help inform a positive and practical debate about the future of terrorism and the required policy responses.

== Methodology ==
There is no single internationally accepted definition of what constitutes terrorism. IEP previously accepted the terminology and definitions agreed to by the authors of the GTD, the National Consortium for the Study of Terrorism and Responses to Terrorism (START) researchers and its advisory panel. The GTI therefore defined terrorism as "the threatened or actual use of illegal force and violence by a state and non-state actor to attain a political, economic, religious, or social goal through fear, coercion, or intimidation". This definition recognises that terrorism is not only the physical act of an attack, but also the psychological impact it has on a society for many years after.

In order to be included as an incident in the GTD the act has to be: "an intentional act of violence or threat of violence by a non-state actor". This means an incident has to meet three criteria in order for it to be counted as a terrorist act:

1. The incident must be intentional – the result of a conscious calculation on the part of a perpetrator.
2. The incident must entail some level of violence or threat of violence – including property damage, as well as violence against people.
3. The perpetrators of the incidents must be sub-national actors. This database does not include acts of state terrorism.

It is not clear that the GTI still uses this definition, and the GTI does not appear to define terrorism in its 2026 report.

=== Indicators and weighting ===
The GTI score for a country in a given year is based on a unique scoring system to account for the relative impact of incidents in the year. There are four indicators counted in each country's yearly score:

- Total number of terrorist incidents in a given year
- Total number of fatalities caused by terrorism in a given year
- Total number of injuries caused by terrorism in a given year
- The approximate level of total property damage from terrorist incidents in a given year

Each of the indicators is weighted differently:

Dimension	Weight
Total number of incidents	1
Total number of fatalities	3
Total number of injuries	0.5
Sum of property damages measure	Between 0 and 3 depending on severity

The greatest weighting is thus in general attributed to a fatality. The property damage measure is further disaggregated into four bands depending on the measured scope of the property damage inflicted by one incident. These bandings are shown in the table below, whereby incidents causing less than US$1 million are accorded a weight of 1, between $1 million and $1 billion, and more than $1 billion. A great majority of incidents are coded in the GTD as an 'unknown' level of property damage, thus scoring nil, with 'catastrophic' events being extremely rare.

Damage level	Weight
Unknown	0
Minor (likely < $1 million)	1
Major (likely between $1 million and $1 billion)	2
Catastrophic (likely > $1 billion)	3

=== Example of a country's indicator weighting ===
To assign a relative number to how a country has been directly impacted by terrorism in any given year, for every incident recorded, the GTI calculates a weighted sum of all indicators. To illustrate, the table below depicts a hypothetical country's score for a given year:

Dimension	Weight	# of records for the given year	Score
Total number of incidents	1	21	21
Total number of fatalities	3	36	108
Total number of injuries	0.5	53	26.5
Sum of property damages measure (depending on severity)	0-3	20	40
Total raw score	195.5		

=== Final score ===
A five-year weighted average is applied to reflect the lingering psychological effect of terrorist acts over time.

Year	Weight
Reference year	16
Previous year	8
Two years ago	4
Three years ago	3
Four years ago	1

The GTI reports are titled by their publication year. The index is calculated up to the preceding year, e.g. the reference year of the 2020 GTI is 2019.

The resulting raw scores are then quasi-logarithmically transformed onto a scale of 0–10 by way of 20 bands. A raw score of $x=0$ corresponds to a GTI of 0. The next 20 steps corresponding to $h = 0.5, 1, ..., 10$ on the GTI scale are defined by

$x_h = (x_\text{max}-x_\text{min})^\frac{h}{10}$,

where $x_h$ are the steps in the raw score, $x_\text{min}$ is the lowest recorded raw score, and $x_\text{max}$ the highest recorded raw score.

GTI is interpolated linearly between these steps.

== By country ==
Legend

- 8-10 (Very high impact)
- 6-8 (High impact)
- 4-6(Medium impact)
- 2-4 (Low impact)
- 0-2 (Very low impact)
- 0 (No impact)
  (Note: this graph is based on how much terrorism affects each country, not how much terrorism it causes)

2026 Global Terrorism Index Ranking
Rank	Country	Score (2026)	Rank change
1	Pakistan	8.574	▲1
2	Burkina Faso	8.324	▼1
3	Niger	7.816	▲2
4	Nigeria	7.792	▲2
5	Mali	7.586	▼1
6	Syria	7.545	▼3
7	Somalia	7.391	Steady
8	Democratic Republic of the Congo	7.171	▲4
9	Colombia	7.116	▲5
10	Israel	6.79	▼2
11	Afghanistan	6.678	▼2
12	Cameroon	6.593	▼2
13	India	6.428	▲2
14	Myanmar	6.245	▼3
15	Mozambique	6.022	▼1
16	Iraq	5.822	▼3
17	Russia	5.593	Steady
18	Iran	5.477	Steady
19	Benin	5.434	▲8
20	Thailand	5.275	▲6
21	Kenya	5.088	▼1
22	Palestine	4.8	▲2
23	Philippines	4.719	▼2
24	Indonesia	4.714	▲6
25	Yemen	4.653	▼2
26	Chad	4.625	▼7
27	Chile	4.553	▼5
28	United States	4.521	▲6
29	Germany	4.447	▼1
30	Togo	4.305	▼5
31	Australia	3.732	▲14
32	Egypt	3.465	▼3
33	Burundi	3.361	▼2
34	Uganda	3.25	▼1
35	France	3.224	▲6
36	Turkey	3.212	▼4
37	Ecuador	3.063	▲20
38	United Kingdom	2.936	▲2
39	Ukraine	2.927	▲8
40	Greece	2.788	▼5
41	Tajikistan	2.602	▲10
42	Bangladesh	2.286	▼6
43	Oman	2.282	▼6
44	Jordan	2.268	▼6
45	Czech Republic	2.261	▼6
46	Sweden	1.839	▲4
47	Algeria	1.766	▼5
48	Poland	1.682	▼2
49	Peru	1.572	▼5
50	Tunisia	1.522	▼7
51	Austria	1.498	▲34
52	Netherlands	1.475	▲10
53	Canada	1.333	▼5
54	China	1.311	▼5
55	Belgium	1.198	▼3
56	Angola	1.136	▼3
57	Malaysia	1.092	▼3
58	Senegal	1.07	▼2
59	Libya	1.007	▼4
60	Italy	0.999	▼3
61	Djibouti	0.925	▼2
62	Brazil	0.909	▼1
63	Tanzania	0.888	▼1
64	Spain	0.794	▲1
65	Bosnia	0.782	▲2
66	Serbia	0.782	▲20
67	Switzerland	0.749	▼3
68	United Arab Emirates	0.749	▲2
69	Norway	0.725	▼1
70	Denmark	0.72	▲10
71	Ivory Coast	0.702	▼11
72	Lebanon	0.648	▼6
73	Slovakia	0.616	▼2
74	Finland	0.582	▲1
75	Japan	0.571	▼2
76	Central African Republic	0.556	▼4
77	Georgia	0.506	▼1
78	Kosovo	0.465	▲1
79	Argentina	0.455	▼2
80	Saudi Arabia	0.443	▼5
81	Armenia	0.423	▼1
82	Ireland	0.423	▼1
83	Lithuania	0.423	▼1
84	Portugal	0.423	▲20
85	Venezuela	0.396	▼1
86	South Korea	0.333	▼1
87	Mexico	0.325	▼2
88	Ethiopia	0.288	▼10
89	Nepal	0.288	▼18
90	Laos	0.233	▼1
91	Latvia	0.233	▼1
92	Cyprus	0.176	▼1
93	Azerbaijan	0.123	▼1
94	Belarus	0.123	▼1
95	New Zealand	0.114	Steady
96	Uzbekistan	0.114	▼3
97	Iceland	0.059	▼1
98	Eswatini	0.044	▼1
99	Bahrain	0.03	Steady
100	Albania	0	▲1
100	Bhutan	0	▲1
100	Bolivia	0	▲1
100	Botswana	0	▲1
100	Bulgaria	0	▲1
100	Costa Rica	0	▲1
100	Croatia	0	▲1
100	Cuba	0	▲1
100	Dominican Republic	0	▲1
100	El Salvador	0	▲1
100	Equatorial Guinea	0	▲1
100	Eritrea	0	▲1
100	Estonia	0	▲1
100	Gabon	0	▲1
100	Ghana	0	▲1
100	Guatemala	0	▲1
100	Guinea	0	▲1
100	Guinea-Bissau	0	▲1
100	Guyana	0	▲1
100	Haiti	0	▲1
100	Honduras	0	▲1
100	Hungary	0	▲1
100	Jamaica	0	▲1
100	Kazakhstan	0	▲1
100	Kuwait	0	▲1
100	Kyrgyzstan	0	▲1
100	Lesotho	0	▲1
100	Liberia	0	▲1
100	Madagascar	0	▲1
100	Malawi	0	▲1
100	Mauritania	0	▲1
100	Mauritius	0	▲1
100	Moldova	0	▲1
100	Mongolia	0	▲1
100	Montenegro	0	▲1
100	Morocco	0	▲1
100	Namibia	0	▲1
100	Nicaragua	0	▲1
100	North Korea	0	▲1
100	North Macedonia	0	▲1
100	Panama	0	▲1
100	Papua New Guinea	0	▲1
100	Paraguay	0	▼2
100	Qatar	0	▲1
100	Republic of the Congo	0	▲1
100	Romania	0	▲1
100	Rwanda	0	▲1
100	Sierra Leone	0	▲1
100	Singapore	0	▲1
100	Slovenia	0	▲1
100	South Africa	0	▲1
100	South Sudan	0	▲1
100	Sri Lanka	0	▲1
100	Sudan	0	▲1
100	Taiwan	0	▲1
100	The Gambia	0	▲1
100	Timor-Leste	0	▲1
100	Trinidad and Tobago	0	▲1
100	Turkmenistan	0	▲1
100	Uruguay	0	▼1
100	Vietnam	0	▲1
100	Zambia	0	▲1
100	Zimbabwe	0	▲1

== Economic impact of terrorism ==
The economic impact of terrorism is calculated using IEP's cost of violence methodology.

The model includes both the direct and indirect costs, such as the lost life-time earnings, cost of medical treatments and property destruction from incidents of terrorism. The direct costs include those borne by the victim of the terrorist act and associated expenditure, such as medical spending. The indirect costs include lost productivity and earning as well as the psychological trauma to the victims, their families and friends.

The analysis presents conservative estimates of the economic impact of terrorism and does not include variables for which detailed appropriate data was not available. For instance, the analysis does not include the impact on business, the cost of fear from terrorism or the cost of counterterrorism.

The global economic impact of terrorism reached US$89.6 billion in 2015, decreasing 15% from its 2014 level.

There have been three peaks in the economic impact of terrorism since the year 2000 and they are linked to the three major waves of terrorism. The first large increase in the economic impact of terrorism happened in 2001, when the attacks of September 11 in New York City and Washington, D.C., took place. The second peak was in 2007 at the height of the Iraq war. The 2007 increase is mainly attributed to al-Qa'ida affiliated terrorist groups and coincided with the coalition troop surge in Iraq. The third wave started in 2012 and is still continuing, with the economic impact of terrorism peaking at US$105.6 billion in 2014. The increase in the last four years was mainly driven by increases in terrorism in Iraq, Syria and Afghanistan.

== Publications by year ==
The Institute for Economics and Peace has published twelve editions of the Global Terrorism Index to date. The most recent report was released in March 2026.

=== 2026 ===
Global Terrorism Index report 2026

=== 2025 ===
Global Terrorism Index report 2025

=== 2024 ===
Global Terrorism Index report 2024

=== 2023 ===
Global Terrorism Index report 2023

=== 2022 ===
Global Terrorism Index report 2022

=== 2020 ===
Global Terrorism Index report 2020

=== 2019 ===
Global Terrorism Index report 2019

=== 2018 ===
Global Terrorism Index report 2018

=== 2017 ===
The fifth edition of the Global Terrorism Index was published in November 2017. The study covered analyses of 163 countries. The global GTI scored deteriorated by four percent from 2015 to 2016.

Overall, deaths from terrorism have fallen for the second consecutive year, resulting in a 22 percent decrease since the peak in 2014. At an all-time high, 106 countries experienced at least one terrorist attack. Of these, 77 countries recorded at least one death, an increase from 65 countries in 2015.

Iraq, Afghanistan, Nigeria, Syria, and Pakistan remain the top five countries most affected by terrorism. However, Nigeria also saw the greatest reduction in deaths. In 2016, deaths attributed to Boko Haram decreased by 80 percent, however, deaths attributed to ISIL increased by 49 percent. Together these five countries accounted for three-quarters of all deaths from terrorism in 2016.

OECD countries have experienced a rise in terrorism, accounting for one percent of global deaths from terrorism in 2016. In 2010 OECD countries accounted for just 0.1 percent of deaths. Attacks in OECD countries have shifted tactics since 2014 to utilize simpler methods against non-traditional targets. Less sophisticated attacks can be executed at a lower cost and can be more difficult to detect. Positively, the first six months of 2017 have recorded 82 deaths from terrorism, lower than the 265 deaths in 2016.

=== 2016 ===
A world map indicating the GTI by country (2016)

The fourth edition of Global Terrorism Index was published in November 2016. The study covered analysis of 163 countries. Overall, the global GTI score decreased by six per cent.

In 2015, the number of deaths from terrorism decreased by ten percent, the first decline since 2010. However, the 29,376 deaths recorded still rank 2015 as the second deadliest year on record. While much attention has been devoted to ISIL, the Taliban recorded its deadliest year in Afghanistan.

As with the past three years, Afghanistan, Iraq, Pakistan, Nigeria, and Syria suffered the highest levels of terrorism, accounting for 72 per cent of all deaths from terrorism in 2015. Large decreases in fatalities in Iraq and Nigeria accounted for a large portion of the worldwide decrease.

Conversely, in OECD member countries, deaths from terrorism dramatically increased in 2015, rising by 650 per cent when compared to 2014. Twenty-one of the 34 OECD countries experienced at least one terrorist attack with the majority of deaths occurring in Turkey and France. Of attacks conducted in the United States, 98 per cent were carried out by lone actors, resulting in 156 deaths.

=== 2015 ===
A world map indicating the GTI by country (based on 2015 data)

The third edition of Global Terrorism Index was published in November 2015. The study covered analysis of 162 countries. Data from 2014 showed there has been a nine-fold increase in the number of deaths from terrorism since 2000.

Terrorist activity increased by 80 per cent in 2014 to its highest recorded level. The largest ever year-on-year increase in deaths from terrorism was recorded in 2014, rising from 18,111 in 2013 to 32,765 in 2014. Terrorism deaths spread geographically as well with the number of countries experiencing over 500 deaths increasing from five to 11.

The rise in terrorism can largely be attributed to two groups: ISIS; and Boko Haram, the Nigerian jihadist group that pledged allegiance to ISIS in March 2015. Combined, these groups were responsible for 51% of all terrorism-related deaths in 2014.

In the West, lone wolf attacks account for 70 per cent of terrorist deaths since 2006. Amongst lone actors, few attacks were inspired by Islamic fundamentalism, with 80 per cent of attacks were attributed to a range of right-wing extremists, nationalists, and other types of political extremism and supremacism.

The countries most heavily affected by terrorism in 2014 were, Iraq, Afghanistan, Nigeria, Pakistan and Syria. Terrorism increased most significantly in Nigeria, where deaths increased by over 300 per cent to 7,512 fatalities.

=== 2014 ===
The second edition of Global Terrorism Index was published in November 2014. The study covered analysis of 162 countries. From 2000 to 2013 there was a five-fold increase in the number of people killed by terrorism, resulting in approximately 18,000 deaths.

Of the 162 countries, 87 experienced a terrorist incident, but only 60 countries recorded one or more deaths from terrorism in 2013. Worldwide over 50 per cent of terrorist attacks claimed no fatalities and only 10 per cent claimed more than five lives. Explosives were used for 60 per cent of attacks, with firearms used in 30 per cent and 10 per cent of attacks using other weapons.

In 2013 terrorist activity increased substantially with the total number of deaths rising from 11,133 in 2012 to 18,111 in 2013, a 61 per cent increase. Over the same period, the number of countries that experienced more than 50 deaths rose from 15 to 24. This highlighted that not only was the intensity of terrorism increasing, its breadth was increasing as well.

The countries most heavily affected by terrorism in 2013 were, Iraq, Afghanistan, Pakistan, Nigeria and Syria. Four terrorist groups, ISIL, Boko Haram, the Taliban, and al-Qa'ida, claimed 66 per cent of deaths in 2013. Among OECD countries, Turkey and Mexico reported the highest deaths in 2013 losing 57 and 40 lives respectively. Since 2000, seven per cent of all terrorist incidents occurred in OECD countries.

=== 2012 ===
The first edition of Global Terrorism Index was published in 2012. The study covered analysis of 158 countries. Data showed that terrorism increased by 234 per cent from 2002 to 2011.

The 2012 report found that the global impact of terrorism increased significantly from 2002 to 2007, reaching its peak in 2007, and subsequently plateauing. The biggest rise took place over the period from 2005 to 2007 when the majority of the global increase in terrorism was driven by events in Iraq. Four other countries also significantly contributed to the global rise with Pakistan, Afghanistan, and the Philippines all experiencing increases, especially between 2007 and 2009.

Only 20 nations scored a zero for terrorist impact over the 2002-2011 period, indicating the impact of terror, while heavily concentrated in some places like Iraq, Afghanistan, Pakistan, and India, was widely distributed around the world.

The countries most heavily affected by terrorism in 2011 were, Iraq, Pakistan, Afghanistan, India and Yemen. Including these countries, the top ten countries affected by terrorism accounted for 87 per cent of total global incidents.

== See also ==
- Number of terrorist incidents by country
- Global Terrorism Database
- Patterns of Global Terrorism
- Global Peace Index
- Global Militarization Index
- United States Peace Index
- Mexico Peace Index
- Institute for Economics and Peace
- Terrorism

== Sources ==
- GTI (2018). Global Terrorism Index 2018 (PDF) (Report). Institute for Economics & Peace. Archived from the original (PDF) on 13 October 2020.
- GTI (2019). Global Terrorism Index 2019 (PDF) (Report). Institute for Economics & Peace. Archived from the original (PDF) on 17 October 2020.
- GTI (2020). Global Terrorism Index 2020 (PDF) (Report). Institute for Economics & Peace. Archived from the original (PDF) on 25 November 2020.
- GTI (2022). Global Terrorism Index 2022 (PDF) (Report). Institute for Economics & Peace. Archived from the original (PDF) on 9 March 2022.
