= International rankings of Gabon =

These are the international rankings of Gabon

== International rankings ==
| Organization | Survey | Ranking |
|---|---|---|
| Institute for Economics and Peace | Global Peace Index | 51 out of 144 |
| United Nations Development Programme | Human Development Index | 103 out of 182 |
| Transparency International | Corruption Perceptions Index | 106 out of 180 |
