= Steve Killelea =

Australian businessman

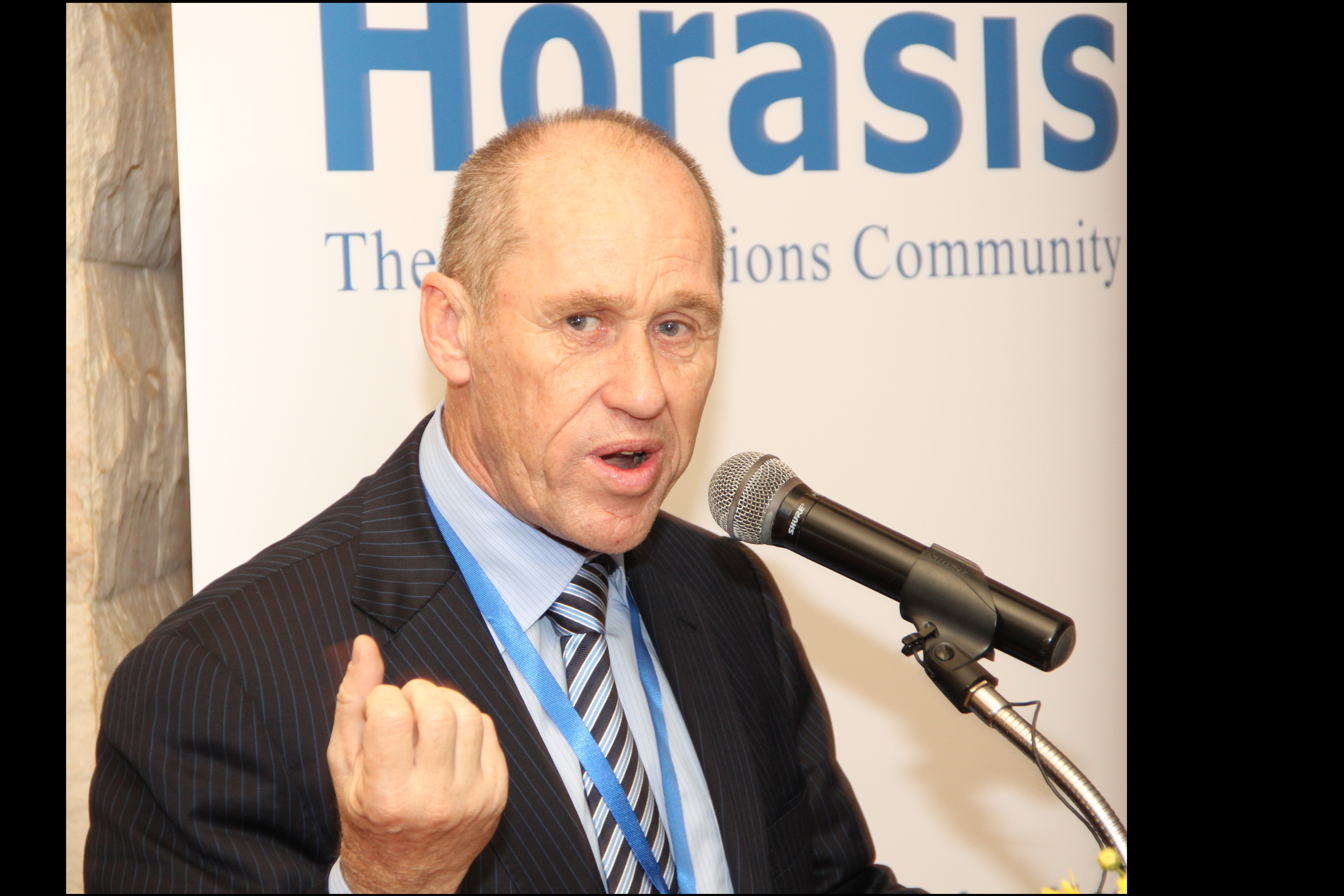
- Steve Killelea, Chairman, IR, Australia, at the 2011 Horasis Global Arab Business Meeting.
- Occupations: Founder, IR; Founder and executive chairman, Institute for Economics and Peace Founder and executive chairman, Smarter Capital; Founder, Global Peace Index; Founder and executive chairman of The Charitable Foundation

Stephen Killelea AM is an Australian IT entrepreneur and founder of the Institute for Economics and Peace, a global think tank.

== Career ==
In August 1988, Killelea formed the Australian company IR, which was listed on the Australian Stock Exchange in 2000. The company's main business is providing its PROGNOSIS performance monitoring software for business-critical computing and IP telephony environments used by corporations such as Visa, MasterCard and American Express; the New York, London and Hong Kong stock exchanges; and most of the world's ATMs. Killela retired from IR as Chairman in November 2018 to focus more time on his philanthropic interests. Killelea also has an IT venture capital fund named Smarter Capital, which is one of the investors behind Australian software firm Emagine International.

Killelea set up The Charitable Foundation (TCF) in 2000, one of Australia's biggest private overseas aid providers, spending over A$5 million in 2008.

Killelea claims credit for launching the Global Peace Index study, launched in May 2007 and prepared by the Economist Intelligence Unit, that ranks countries' and regions' peacefulness. The Index has been endorsed by the Dalai Lama, Desmond Tutu and Jimmy Carter. Killelea is the founder of the Institute for Economics and Peace (IEP) which is "analysing the impact of peace on sustainability, defining the 'Peace Industry', estimating the value of peace to the world economy, and uncovering the social structures and social attitudes that are at the core of peaceful societies".

In 2013, Killelea’s founding of IEP was recognized as one of the 50 most impactful philanthropic gifts in Australia’s history by a coalition including the Myer Family Company, The Myer Foundation and Sidney Myer Fund, Pro Bono Australia, Swinburne University and Philanthropy Australia. He is also notable as being one of Australia's largest individual donors to overseas aid. He sits on the advisory board of the Washington DC–based Alliance for Peacebuilding, is a member of the Presidents Circle of the Club of Madrid, and is the Treasurer of Religions for Peace.

In 2008, Killelea was the producer and chief financier for the documentary Soldiers of Peace, which was shown at the 2009 Cannes Film Festival, where it received The Club of Budapest World Ethic Film Award. The documentary also won Best Feature Film at the Monaco International Film Festival.

== Honors ==
In June 2010, Killelea was appointed a Member of the Order of Australia for his service to the community through the global peace movement and the provision of humanitarian aid to the developing world.

== Publications ==
- Killelea, Steve. "Foreword" in Analytical Peace Economics: The Illusion of War for Peace, edited by Partha Gangopadhyay and Nasser Elkanj, Routledge, Taylor & Francis Group, 2017, pp. xiv–xv. ISBN 978-1138935457.
- Killelea, Steve. "The Economic Opportunity of Improving Peace in the United States" in Learning from the World: New Ideas to Redevelop America, edited by Joe Colombano and Aniket Shah, Palgrave Macmillan, 2014, pp. 254–266. ISBN 978-1-137-37213-0.
- Killelea, Steve. "Chapter 9: Studying and Creating Peace" in On World Religions: Diversity, Not Dissension, edited by Anindita N. Balslev, SAGE Publications Pvt. Ltd., 2014. ISBN 978-81-321-1834-3 (HB).
- Killelea, Steve. "The pillars of peace: identifying the elements that allow human potential to flourish" in The Necessary Transition: The Journey Towards the Sustainable Enterprise Economy, edited by Malcolm McIntosh, Greenleaf Publishing Limited, 2013, pp. 119–131. ISBN 978-1-906093-89-1.
- Killelea, Steve. "Fact Based Approaches to Peace Making: Global Peace Index" in Peacemaking from Practice to Theory, edited by Susan Allen Nan et al., vol. 2, Praeger Security International, 2011, pp. 438–457. ISBN 978-0-313-37580-4 (vol. 2).
- Killelea, Steve. "Shared Societies and Peace: The ends and means of development" in Development, vol. 57, Issue 1, Palgrave Macmillan, 2014. pp. 6470. ISSN 1461-7072
- Killelea, Steve. "Chapter 4 - Australia: An Evolution of Personal Giving and the Business of World Peace" in Global Philanthropy, edited by Norine MacDonald and Luc Tayart de Borms, MF Publishing, 2010, pp. 43–59. ISBN 978-0-9564422-0-8.
- Killelea, Steve. "Chapter 10: Pillars of Peace" in Why Love Matters: Values in Governance, edited by Scherto Gill and David Cadman, Peter Lang International Academic Publishers, 2015, pp. 133–149. ISBN 9781433129292/ ISBN 1433129299.
- Killelea, Steve, and Roland Schatz, editors. Global Peace Report 2010, InnoVatio Ltd., 2010, ISBN 978-3-906501-29-1.
- Killelea, Steve, and Roland Schatz, editors. Global Peace Report 2011, InnoVatio Ltd., 2011, ISBN 978-3-906501-29-1.

== See also ==
- Global Terrorism Index
- List of peace activists
