= Bonn Alliance for Sustainability Research =

German research institution association

The Bonn Alliance for Sustainability Research (Bonner Allianz for short) is an association of six university and non-university research institutions in Bonn that have joined forces to pool and strengthen knowledge and expertise in research on the topics of sustainability and sustainable development. The Bonn Alliance networks and supports partner institutions in policy- and practice-relevant research on sustainability, which takes place in a dialogue between science, business and politics and extends from the local context to the global level.

== Partner institutions ==
The Bonn Alliance for Sustainability Research comprises six partner institutions: the Bonn International Centre for Conflict Studies (BICC), the German Institute of Development and Sustainability (IDOS), the Bonn-Rhine Sieg University of Applied Sciences (H-BRS), the United Nations University Institute for Environment and Human Security (UNU-EHS), and the Rheinische Friedrich-Wilhelms-Universität Bonn with its Center for Development Research (ZEF).

== Foundation ==
The Bonn Alliance for Sustainability Research was founded on November 15, 2017, at the UN Climate Change Conference 2017 (COP23) under the leadership of the Rheinische Friedrich-Wilhelms-Universität Bonn with the aim of uniting and intensifying top competencies in sustainability research.

== Funding ==
After its foundation, the Bonn Alliance for Sustainability Research received start-up funding from the Ministry of Culture and Science of the State of North Rhine-Westphalia (MKW), as well as from the Federal Ministry of Education and Research (BMBF) for the pilot project "Digitainable - Digitization and Sustainability".

== Goals ==
The goal of the Bonn Alliance is to provide scientific support for the implementation of the UN Agenda 2030 on a local and global level, while at the same time critically engaging with it. To this end, it unites university and non-university as well as applied and basic research through its partner institutions with the aim of bundling and promoting knowledge and competencies in the field of sustainability research. This strong bundling of competencies and joint expertise of the Bonn research institutions strengthens the partners at the location in terms of an international sustainability competence center.

In September 2018, an office for the Bonn Alliance was established to coordinate and support the cooperation of the partner institutions in joint research projects, training, transfer and competence development.

== Research and projects ==
On the occasion of its founding, the Bonn Alliance identified three strategic research priorities whose particularly topical relevance it intends to bring to bear on the broad topic of sustainability: "Digitalization and artificial intelligence," "Mobility and migration," and "Bioeconomy." To implement these research priorities, the Bonn Alliance established various research projects. Since its founding, the research focus of the Bonn Alliance has expanded to include other topics and program lines within sustainability research.
