= United Kingdom Peace Index =

The United Kingdom Peace Index (UKPI) is a measurement of the United Kingdom's cities by their peacefulness. Created by the Institute for Economics and Peace, the creators of the Global Peace Index and the United States Peace Index, the United Kingdom ranked 29/158 on the Global Peace index for 2012. The UKPI was released in April 2013 and provides a comprehensive measure of the levels of peacefulness within the United Kingdom from 2003 to 2012. Peace is defined as the absence of violence or the absence of the fear of violence. The UKPI also provides an analysis of the socio-economic factors associated with peacefulness, as well as an estimate of the economic benefits that would flow from increases in peace.

== Findings of the report ==
The index found that the rate of homicides per 100,000 people in the UK had fallen from 1.99 in 2003, to 1 in 2012. Further, it found that the violent crime rate was down by about one quarter (from 1,255 per 100,000 people in 2003, to 933 in 2012), with the southeast of the country as the most peaceful place to live (Broadland in Norfolk received the highest rank). In Scotland, Glasgow was rated least peaceful and the Orkney Islands as most peaceful. In Northern Ireland, Belfast was worst and Castlereagh was best. The report finds Wales as "easily" the most peaceful of the nations of the UK. In terms of other categories of crimes, public disorder offenses fell by 29%, while weapons crimes fell by 34%. The index found that 25 per cent of British citizens expect to become a victim of crime, while only 4 per cent actually experience it. Despite the high rate of perceptions of crime, the country experienced the largest drop in violence rates of any European country over the last decade. The report notes that "there is no commonly accepted explanation by criminologists for the fall in violence in many of the world's regions including the US, Western Europe, Eastern and Central Europe, as well as the UK," and that "many of the more common theories" are not backed by statistical evidence. For example, while the many countries suffered severely financially during the 2008 financial crisis, and while levels of peacefulness increased, the idea that violent crime goes up when the economy goes down is not backed by the evidence.

The UKPI reinforces findings from the United States Peace Index: access to employment, health, and education provides protection from the poverty and has significant impact on reducing violence and improving economic activity. The study found that violence costs the U.K. 124 billion pounds ($189 billion) a year, more than 7 percent of gross domestic product. The authors of the index have stated that a 9% reduction in violence in the UK would be equivalent to the total cost of the London Olympics.
