= Balsley =

Balsley is a surname. Notable people with the surname include:

- Darren Balsley (born 1964), pitching coach at Major League Baseball's San Diego Padres franchise
- John H. Balsley (1823–1895), master carpenter and inventor
- Phil Balsley (born 1939), the former baritone singer for the retired country vocal group The Statler Brothers
- Thomas Balsley, American landscape architect

== See also ==
- Balsley Peak, a distinctive peak in Alexandra Mountains
- Balslev (disambiguation)
