= EMME =

Eastern Mediterranean & Middle East (EMME)

EMME is an acronym in the English language for a grouping of 18 nations situated in and around the Eastern Mediterranean and Middle East. The diverse region reflects cultural, economic, and environmental similarities. The acronym is most often used in academic or official settings to reference the region.

== Members ==
EMME has members from three continents: Africa, Asia, and Europe. They are:

1. Bahrain
2. Cyprus
3. Egypt
4. Greece
5. Iran
6. Iraq
7. Israel
8. Jordan
9. Kuwait
10. Lebanon
11. Oman
12. Palestine
13. Qatar
14. Saudi Arabia
15. Syria
16. Turkey
17. United Arab Emirates
18. Yemen

== Climate change "hot spot" ==
The academic journal EOS reported that EMME, "faces rapid climate change" and that "Observational and modeling studies identify the Eastern Mediterranean and Middle East as a prominent climate change hotspot associated with weather extremes that have major impacts on society."

According to the United Nations Economic Commission for Europe and the CORDIS EU Research of the European Commission, the EMME Climate Change Initiative, launched by the president of Cyprus, aims to bring these countries together to develop a concerted regional response to address the climate crisis, in line with the goals of the Paris Agreement.

This initiative states that "450 million inhabitants of the eighteen countries comprising the EMME region are at risk of a 5°C increase in mean annual temperature by the end of the century, under a “business as usual” scenario. This will lead to a catastrophe of unprecedented scale, inducing social collapse and mass migration, unless immediate action is taken on mitigation and adaptation through strong regional cooperation."

== See also ==
- MENA/WANA/SWANA
- Europe, the Middle East and Africa
- Near East
- Climate change in the Middle East and North Africa
- List of country groupings
