= Number of terrorist incidents by country =

This is a list of the number of incidents labelled as Terrorism and not believed to have been carried out by a Government or its forces (see State terrorism and State-sponsored terrorism). The following tables show the number of incidents, deaths, injuries based on data from the Global Terrorism Database (GTD) which was collected and collated by the National Consortium for the Study of Terrorism and Responses to Terrorism (START) at the University of Maryland. The GTD defines a terrorist attack as "the threatened or actual use of illegal force and violence by a non‐state actor to attain a political, economic, religious, or social goal through fear, coercion, or intimidation."

== Worldwide ==
=== By year ===
View source data.

Terrorist incidents worldwide
Year	Number of incidents	Deaths	Injuries	Remarks
2019	8,473	20,309	?	
2018	9,600	22,980	?	
2017	10,900	26,445	24,927	
2016	13,587	34,871	40,001	
2015	14,965	38,853	44,043	
2014	16,903	44,490	41,128	
2013	12,036	22,273	37,688	
2012	8,522	15,497	25,445	
2011	5,076	8,246	14,659	
2010	4,826	7,827	15,947	
2009	4,721	9,273	19,138	
2008	4,805	9,157	18,998	
2007	3,242	12,824	22,524	
2006	2,758	9,380	15,550	
2005	2,017	6,331	12,784	
2004	1,166	5,743	12,022	
2003	1,278	3,317	7,384	
2002	1,333	4,805	7,162	
2001	1,906	7,729	22,774	
2000	1,814	4,403	5,869	
1999	1,395	3,393	5,341	
1998	934	4,688	8,183	
1997	3,197	10,924	9,072	
1996	3,058	6,966	10,795	
1995	3,081	6,103	14,292	
1994	3,456	7,690	7,569	
1993	746	2,665	5,607	
1992	5,071	9,742	9,915	
1991	4,683	8,429	7,591	
1990	3,887	7,148	6,128	
1989	4,324	8,152	5,539	
1988	3,721	7,208	6,960	
1987	3,183	6,482	5,775	
1986	2,860	4,976	5,814	
1985	2,915	7,094	5,130	
1984	3,495	10,450	5,291	
1983	2,870	9,444	4,047	
1982	2,544	5,136	3,342	
1981	2,586	4,851	3,337	
1980	2,662	4,400	3,645	
1979	2,662	2,100	2,506	
1978	1,526	1,459	1,600	
1977	1,319	456	518	
1976	9	674	756	
1975	740	617	617	
1974	581	539	865	
1973	473	370	495	
1972	568	566	409	
1971	471	173	82	
1970	651	174	212	
Total	182,437	420,690	529,476	

== By country ==
=== 2017 ===
Terrorist incidents by country in 2017
Country	Number of incidents	Deaths	Injuries
Afghanistan	1,083	1,002	84
United States of America	484	1,805	1,031
Syria	243	2,026	1,303
Yemen	226	762	722
Egypt	224	877	626
Libya	190	289	171
Turkey	181	222	328
Thailand	179	72	270
Republic of the Congo	143	596	193
Mali	141	361	347
United Kingdom	122	42	301
Colombia	117	84	117
Myanmar	115	218	35
Sudan	106	82	176
Kenya	97	126	97
Cameroon	94	228	243
West Bank and Gaza Strip	83	50	75
Ukraine	61	40	64
Saudi Arabia	54	31	69
South Sudan	54	581	258
Central African Republic	43	601	239
Greece	43	0	7
France	41	7	28
Sri Lanka	41	1	3
Bangladesh	41	25	73
Russia	33	61	114
Israel	32	17	15
Burkina Faso	32	53	45
South Africa	29	21	7
Germany	27	1	10
Ethiopia	27	67	53
Indonesia	27	20	27
Lebanon	23	17	49
Bahrain	21	6	26
Burundi	21	20	127
Mexico	20	23	6
Sweden	18	5	32
Venezuela	17	5	32
Ireland	17	0	0
Algeria	14	12	19
Ivory Coast	13	3	2
Uganda	13	7	2
Niger	13	148	72
Chile	12	0	2
Pakistan	27	26	9
Mozambique	11	22	11
Iran	11	39	67
Paraguay	10	4	1
Jordan	8	4	1
Italy	8	0	8
Papua New Guinea	8	0	3
Peru	8	8	4
Kosovo	8	0	4
Chad	6	62	1
Angola	6	7	411
Tanzania	6	8	4
China	6	16	76
Gabon	4	0	2
Tunisia	4	5	5
Spain	4	21	111
Malaysia	4	4	2
Australia	4	4	21
Zimbabwe	3	0	1
Belgium	3	2	2
Sierra Leone	3	0	0
Malta	3	1	0
Ecuador	3	0	0
Argentina	3	0	0
Czech Republic	3	0	0
Azerbaijan	2	5	2
Jamaica	2	0	0
Kyrgyzstan	2	0	0
Zambia	2	0	0
Finland	2	2	10
Vietnam	2	0	0
Brazil	2	0	0
Rwanda	2	2	8
Maldives	2	1	0
Tajikistan	2	1	0
Taiwan	1	0	1
Laos	1	1	0
Netherlands	1	0	0
Georgia	1	0	5
Poland	1	0	0
Djibouti	1	0	0
Honduras	1	2	0
Dominican Republic	1	2	1
Latvia	1	0	0
Albania	1	0	0
Liberia	1	0	0
North Macedonia	1	0	0
Austria	1	2	0
Norway	1	0	0
Malawi	1	0	0
Total	10,900	26,445	24,927

=== 2016 ===
Terrorist incidents by country in 2016
Country	Number of incidents	Deaths	Injuries	Remarks
Iraq	3,356	12,187	14,285	
Afghanistan	1,615	6,119	6,485	
India	1,019	462	784	
Pakistan	861	1,112	1,894	
Philippines	633	411	720	
Somalia	590	1,558	1,275	
Turkey	540	1,004	2,772	
Nigeria	531	2,164	1,155	
Yemen	521	1,517	1,340	
Syria	472	2,755	2,936	
Libya	417	631	737	
Egypt	365	606	626	
Thailand	329	120	385	
Sudan	173	182	213	
Democratic Republic of the Congo	169	532	176	
West Bank and Gaza Strip	157	90	124	
Saudi Arabia	124	161	196	
United Kingdom	104	9	20	
Mali	98	176	220	
Bangladesh	88	76	90	
Colombia	85	38	60	
Burundi	83	74	213	
Mozambique	78	62	83	
Myanmar	74	73	58	
Kenya	65	72	69	
United States	61	68	139	
Ukraine	60	48	39	
South Sudan	59	633	191	
Cameroon	54	245	324	
Russia	54	64	61	
Israel	50	16	175	
Nepal	43	5	15	
Germany	41	27	117	
Lebanon	41	25	74	
Central African Republic	34	189	173	
Greece	31	66	2	
South Africa	27	21	11	
France	26	95	470	
Niger	23	184	139	
Indonesia	19	22	35	
Malaysia	19	6	9	
Chile	17	0	4	
Sweden	16	0	1	
Ireland	15	2	3	
Uganda	15	75	19	
Paraguay	15	10	2	
Republic of the Congo	13	31	0	
Ethiopia	13	279	83	
Tunisia	12	71	26	
Italy	11	1	1	
Burkina Faso	10	62	40	
Iran	10	12	8	
Australia	9	0	1	
Algeria	9	9	2	
Jordan	9	35	65	
Kosovo	8	0	0	
Belgium	6	36	276	
Venezuela	6	9	77	
Canada	6	1	34	
Netherlands	6	1	3	
China	5	13	18	
Mexico	5	4	0	
Chad	5	22	68	
Laos	4	3	15	
Georgia	4	1	7	
Kyrgyzstan	4	1	5	
Bahrain	3	1	2	
Spain	3	0	4	
Finland	3	0	0	
Austria	3	0	0	
Kazakhstan	3	10	11	
Peru	3	11	7	
Tanzania	3	3	2	
Ecuador	2	1	7	
Angola	2	0	0	
Cyprus	2	0	0	
Czech Republic	2	0	1	
Armenia	2	6	1	
Poland	2	0	1	
Albania	2	0	0	
Argentina	2	0	2	
Azerbaijan	2	1	1	
Kuwait	2	1	1	
Japan	1	19	26	Sagamihara stabbings
Maldives	1	0	3	
Sri Lanka	1	0	2	
Uruguay	1	1	1	
Denmark	1	1	3	
Haiti	1	7	0	
South Korea	1	0	0	
Slovak Republic	1	0	1	
Guyana	1	0	0	
Hungary	1	0	2	
Rwanda	1	0	0	
Ivory Coast	1	22	33	2016 Grand-Bassam shootings
Panama	1	0	0	
Brazil	1	1	0	
Moldova	1	0	0	
New Zealand	1	0	0	
Sierra Leone	1	1	0	
Guinea	1	1	0	
Tajikistan	1	1	0	
Switzerland	1	0	0	
Madagascar	1	3	91	A grenade attack on June 26
Taiwan	1	0	0	
Bulgaria	1	0	1	
Honduras	1	2	0	
Ghana	1	0	0	
Total	13,488	34,676	39,851	

=== 2015 ===
Terrorist incidents by country in 2015
Country	Number of incidents	Deaths	Injuries	Remarks
Iraq	2,743	8,831	13,322	
Afghanistan	1,926	6,208	6,958	
Pakistan	1,235	1,606	1,847	
India	882	387	647	
Philippines	717	444	752	
Yemen	668	2,373	3,065	
Ukraine	637	765	1,401	
Nigeria	637	5,351	2,854	
Egypt	582	790	1,000	
Libya	542	689	840	
Syria	485	3,916	2,978	
Bangladesh	465	76	695	
Turkey	416	490	1,100	
Somalia	407	1,389	799	
Thailand	277	116	462	
West Bank and Gaza Strip	247	117	239	
Sudan	158	210	329	
Democratic Republic of the Congo	141	367	244	
Colombia	135	104	137	
Mali	120	268	250	
United Kingdom	115	1	23	
Saudi Arabia	103	213	281	
Burundi	97	220	218	
Cameroon	82	928	461	
Kenya	68	276	205	
Israel	58	20	118	
South Sudan	54	218	137	
Germany	50	6	51	
Central African Republic	48	172	91	
Nepal	47	0	11	
Lebanon	44	111	347	
Niger	41	666	116	
United States	38	44	52	
France	36	161	159	
Sweden	36	4	4	
Myanmar	33	58	151	
Greece	31	1	2	
Ireland	29	0	0	
Indonesia	28	19	17	
Chad	27	306	427	
Russia	21	21	24	
Mexico	19	9	10	
Paraguay	19	13	0	
Bahrain	18	5	22	
Tunisia	17	103	121	
Algeria	16	21	19	
China	16	123	83	
Tanzania	14	10	14	
Sri Lanka	11	3	14	
Japan	10	0	0	
Peru	10	6	7	
Uganda	10	4	1	
Iran	9	38	11	
Finland	9	0	1	
Mozambique	7	12	3	
Australia	7	2	0	
Ethiopia	7	48	43	
Bosnia-Herzegovina	6	4	6	
Italy	5	0	1	
Canada	5	0	2	
Brazil	5	3	0	
Malaysia	5	1	1	
Burkina Faso	5	6	9	
North Macedonia	4	0	2	
Albania	4	0	0	
Ivory Coast	4	14	10	
Denmark	4	2	5	
Czech Republic	4	0	0	
Jordan	4	7	11	
Tajikistan	3	12	10	
Cyprus	3	0	0	
Venezuela	3	1	0	
Kosovo	2	0	0	
Netherlands	2	0	0	
Laos	2	0	0	
Senegal	2	0	4	
Maldives	2	0	3	
Estonia	2	0	0	
Kyrgyzstan	2	1	0	
Guinea	2	1	4	
South Africa	2	2	32	
Armenia	2	0	1	
Bulgaria	2	0	0	
Malta	1	0	0	
Ecuador	1	0	0	
Kuwait	1	28	227	2015 Kuwait mosque bombing
Lesotho	1	1	2	
Georgia	1	0	0	
Hungary	1	0	0	
Djibouti	1	0	0	
Trinidad and Tobago	1	0	0	
Morocco	1	0	0	
Chile	1	0	0	
Argentina	1	0	0	
South Korea	1	0	1	
Montenegro	1	0	0	
Uzbekistan	1	0	0	
Qatar	1	0	1	

=== 2014 ===
Terrorist incidents by country in 2014
Country	Number of incidents	Deaths	Injuries	Remarks
Iraq	3,925	13,076	16,735	
Pakistan	2,147	2,412	3,395	
Afghanistan	1,820	5,413	5,111	
Ukraine	891	1,396	1,220	
Somalia	862	1,582	780	
India	860	490	776	
Yemen	761	1,348	1,305	
Libya	730	697	893	
Nigeria	713	7,773	2,283	
Philippines	597	472	723	
Thailand	423	192	651	
Egypt	346	338	547	
Syria	328	3,301	1,980	
Israel	293	49	152	
Colombia	230	143	314	
Lebanon	204	132	532	
Sudan	157	546	320	
West Bank and Gaza Strip	134	67	94	
Bangladesh	130	38	114	
Kenya	115	315	408	
Democratic Republic of the Congo	109	366	170	
United Kingdom	103	0	4	
Central African Republic	94	751	298	
Turkey	90	38	81	
Mali	68	123	221	
Cameroon	67	788	18	
Russia	48	67	88	
Bahrain	41	9	39	
South Sudan	39	908	601	
China	37	322	478	
Indonesia	33	19	30	
Ireland	33	0	1	
United States	26	19	6	
Greece	26	0	4	
Tunisia	23	43	64	
Mozambique	22	22	60	
South Africa	20	9	8	
Chile	17	1	26	
Sri Lanka	16	3	65	
Paraguay	15	6	2	
France	14	1	15	
Saudi Arabia	14	20	23	
Algeria	13	37	30	
Germany	13	0	0	
Malaysia	12	1	4	
Peru	12	4	12	
Tanzania	11	4	43	
Iran	10	13	6	
Myanmar	10	15	35	
Maldives	9	0	0	
Australia	8	4	7	
Nepal	7	0	7	
Italy	7	0	3	
Uganda	6	98	16	
Sweden	5	0	1	
Cyprus	5	0	0	
Burundi	5	4	1	
Niger	5	11	9	
Mexico	5	1	2	
Czech Republic	5	1	1	
Japan	5	0	0	
Venezuela	4	1	1	
Kosovo	4	2	3	
Jordan	3	1	7	
Azerbaijan	3	0	1	
Spain	3	0	0	
Bosnia-Herzegovina	3	0	4	
Brazil	3	2	0	
North Macedonia	3	0	5	
Canada	3	7	6	
Rwanda	2	1	16	
Kyrgyzstan	2	1	1	
Senegal	2	7	3	
Nicaragua	2	5	28	
Albania	2	1	2	
United Arab Emirates	2	1	0	
Belgium	2	4	3	
Ethiopia	2	9	6	
Georgia	2	0	1	
Dominican Republic	1	0	35	
Djibouti	1	5	15	
Jamaica	1	0	1	
Liberia	1	0	0	
Honduras	1	0	1	
Hungary	1	0	0	
Ghana	1	0	3	
New Zealand	1	0	0	
Iceland	1	0	0	
Malta	1	0	0	
Bhutan	1	0	0	
Bulgaria	1	0	0	
Netherlands	1	0	0	
Tajikistan	1	1	2	
Madagascar	1	1	31	
Turkmenistan	1	3	2	
Chad	1	6	0	
Ivory Coast	1	4	0	
Zimbabwe	1	0	0	

=== 2013 ===
Terrorist incidents by country in 2013
Country	Number of incidents	Deaths	Injuries	Remarks
Iraq	2,849	7,038	15,704	
Pakistan	2,213	2,874	5,768	
Afghanistan	1,441	3,696	4,321	
India	694	467	771	
Philippines	651	432	666	
Thailand	471	252	679	
Yemen	424	624	898	
Nigeria	345	2,014	528	
Somalia	334	646	597	
Egypt	315	243	623	
Libya	293	233	619	
Syria	278	1,558	2,237	
Colombia	148	137	263	
Russia	144	148	288	
Bangladesh	139	16	117	
United Kingdom	137	4	64	
Lebanon	121	190	1,048	
Nepal	102	3	86	
Kenya	79	206	446	
West Bank and Gaza Strip	64	12	27	
Mali	58	137	138	
Greece	53	2	7	
Bahrain	52	3	39	
Sudan	46	220	150	
Turkey	42	83	192	
Israel	37	2	8	
Indonesia	32	23	16	
Tunisia	29	25	28	
Ireland	26	0	1	
Democratic Republic of the Congo	22	150	72	
Algeria	22	101	48	
Central African Republic	20	120	71	
United States	19	22	422	
Mozambique	18	37	80	
Myanmar	17	10	25	
Sri Lanka	14	0	29	
Malaysia	13	2	1	
South Sudan	13	226	113	
South Africa	13	2	5	
China	12	60	71	
France	12	0	5	
Iran	11	39	17	
Paraguay	10	12	15	
Peru	10	6	4	
Cyprus	9	0	0	
Mexico	8	47	110	
Tanzania	7	8	83	
Italy	7	0	4	
Saudi Arabia	6	1	2	
Kosovo	6	1	4	
Guatemala	6	4	3	
Spain	5	0	1	
Ukraine	5	1	3	
Ethiopia	5	17	0	
Kazakhstan	4	0	1	
Chile	4	2	1	
Rwanda	4	6	62	
Canada	4	0	0	
Niger	4	26	33	
Ivory Coast	4	4	3	
Trinidad and Tobago	3	0	0	
Maldives	3	0	2	
Brazil	3	2	0	
Zimbabwe	3	1	1	
Cameroon	3	7	0	
Senegal	3	7	1	
Bulgaria	3	0	0	
Madagascar	2	0	0	
Montenegro	2	0	0	
Croatia	2	0	1	
Argentina	2	0	2	
Guinea	2	0	0	
Cambodia	2	0	0	
Ecuador	2	1	0	
Burundi	2	5	12	
Honduras	2	5	0	
Switzerland	2	0	0	
Taiwan	2	0	0	
Georgia	2	2	0	
United Arab Emirates	1	0	0	
Burkina Faso	1	1	0	
Dominican Republic	1	0	0	
Denmark	1	0	0	
Republic of the Congo	1	2	5	
Bahamas	1	0	0	
Czech Republic	1	1	0	
Albania	1	0	0	
Bosnia-Herzegovina	1	0	0	
Belize	1	0	0	
Austria	1	0	2	
Australia	1	0	0	
Armenia	1	0	1	
Jordan	1	0	0	

=== 2012 ===
Terrorist incidents by country in 2012
Country	Number of incidents	Deaths	Injuries	Remarks
Pakistan	1,652	2,783	4,264	
Afghanistan	1,469	3,521	4,653	
Iraq	1,438	2,688	7,015	
Nigeria	616	1,504	1,012	
India	611	264	651	
Somalia	318	775	719	
Yemen	312	1,056	925	
Thailand	279	209	1,055	
Philippines	247	210	440	
Turkey	189	248	464	
Syria	179	876	1,927	
Russia	151	161	260	
Colombia	115	168	456	
Kenya	80	107	421	
Israel	66	14	90	
France	65	8	8	
Libya	60	33	37	
United Kingdom	51	1	2	
Egypt	49	44	87	
Nepal	46	9	29	
Algeria	41	30	105	
Sudan	40	60	95	
Indonesia	39	15	20	
Ireland	29	0	0	
Bahrain	26	4	37	
Democratic Republic of the Congo	25	288	165	
West Bank and Gaza Strip	22	12	20	
Greece	22	0	3	
Bangladesh	18	8	32	
Myanmar	17	16	10	
United States	17	7	6	
Ivory Coast	16	45	11	
Mexico	16	17	8	
Lebanon	15	9	92	
Mali	14	5	45	
Senegal	12	16	40	
Italy	10	0	1	
Ukraine	8	1	36	
Peru	6	10	8	
Rwanda	6	10	40	
Saudi Arabia	6	4	10	
Germany	5	0	0	
South Sudan	5	68	22	
Iran	5	12	11	
Tajikistan	5	3	6	
Burundi	4	6	22	
Paraguay	4	1	2	
Sri Lanka	4	0	1	
Central African Republic	4	14	16	
Kazakhstan	4	2	3	
Kosovo	4	3	4	
China	4	27	38	
South Africa	4	5	4	
Uganda	4	5	0	
Serbia	3	1	2	
Georgia	3	1	2	
Ethiopia	3	25	8	
Belarus	3	0	0	
Chile	2	0	0	
Sweden	2	0	0	
Canada	2	0	0	
Argentina	2	0	0	
Bulgaria	2	8	30	
Jordan	2	1	16	
Malaysia	2	2	1	
Bolivia	1	0	2	
Guatemala	1	2	1	
Madagascar	1	0	3	
Liberia	1	0	0	
Laos	1	0	0	
North Macedonia	1	5	0	
Venezuela	1	0	2	
Iceland	1	0	0	
Ecuador	1	0	0	
Belgium	1	1	1	
Spain	1	0	0	
Cyprus	1	0	0	
Guinea-Bissau	1	1	0	
Brazil	1	1	0	
Moldova	1	0	0	
Niger	1	1	0	
Tunisia	1	0	0	
Mozambique	1	1	4	

== See also ==
- Global Terrorism Index
- State-sponsored terrorism
- List of countries by Fragile States Index
