= Global Militarisation Index =

Measure of states' peacefulness

The Global Militarization Index (GMI) is an annual report produced by the Bonn International Centre for Conflict Studies (BICC) which measures the relative position of nations' and regions' peacefulness. It is financially supported by the German Federal Ministry for Economic Cooperation and Development.

The GMI was first published in 2006. The GMI 2023 covers 149 states and is widely used to study the military economies of different countries and to compare them. It focuses on three major indicators: military personnel, military expenditures and weaponry.

== Measurement ==
The index uses a number of indicators.

- Military Expenditure Index Score: comparison of military expenditures with GDP and health care expenditures.
- People Index Score: contrast between the number of military and paramilitary forces with the overall population and the number of physicians.
- Heavy Weapons Index Score: number of heavy weapons available per capita.

== Countries ==
- 1-30 (Very Strong)
- 30-60 (Strong)
- 60-90 (Moderate)
- 90-120 (Little)
- 120-149 (Very little)

2023 Global Militarisation Index
Rank	Country
1	Ukraine
2	Israel
3	Armenia
4	Qatar
5	Bahrain
6	Saudi Arabia
7	Greece
8	Singapore
9	Azerbaijan
10	Russia
11	Lebanon
12	Kuwait
13	Oman
14	Jordan
15	South Korea
16	Brunei
17	Cyprus
18	Algeria
19	Belarus
20	Morocco
21	Lithuania
22	Botswana
23	Cambodia
24	Togo
25	United States
26	Finland
27	Serbia
28	Iran
29	Estonia
30	Mongolia
31	Chad
32	Namibia
33	Mauritania
34	Myanmar
35	Iraq
36	Romania
37	South Sudan
38	Croatia
39	Egypt
40	Uruguay
41	Turkey
42	Montenegro
43	Georgia
44	Pakistan
45	Tunisia
46	Poland
47	Norway
48	Sri Lanka
49	Republic of the Congo
50	Angola
51	Burundi
52	France
53	Mali
54	Kyrgyzstan
55	Chile
56	Australia
57	Switzerland
58	Bulgaria
59	Gabon
60	Guinea Bissau
61	Slovakia
62	Sweden
63	Thailand
64	Latvia
65	Italy
66	Colombia
67	Denmark
68	Sudan
69	Slovenia
70	United Kingdom
71	Venezuela
72	Rwanda
73	Uganda
74	Hungary
75	Niger
76	Burkina Faso
77	Bolivia
78	Portugal
79	India
80	Czechia
81	Spain
82	Peru
83	Senegal
84	Equatorial Guinea
85	Netherlands
86	El Salvador
87	Central African Republic
88	Belgium
89	Guinea
90	Ecuador
91	Kazakhstan
92	Nicaragua
93	Bosnia and Herzegovina
94	Canada
95	Malaysia
96	Moldova
97	Austria
98	Germany
99	Ethiopia
100	Luxembourg
101	Mozambique
102	Albania
103	China
104	Fiji
105	Cameroon
106	Eswatini
107	Honduras
108	Nepal
109	Zimbabwe
110	Zambia
111	Afghanistan
112	Tanzania
113	Jamaica
114	Brazil
115	New Zealand
116	South Africa
117	Japan
118	Bangladesh
119	Benin
120	Tajikistan
121	Ivory Coast
122	Dominican Republic
123	Kenya
124	Indonesia
125	Paraguay
126	Gambia
127	Liberia
128	Lesotho
129	Philippines
130	Seychelles
131	Malawi
132	Argentina
133	Guyana
134	Belize
135	Nigeria
136	Mexico
137	Sierra Leone
138	Democratic Republic of the Congo
139	East Timor
140	Guatemala
141	Madagascar
142	Ireland
143	Ghana
144	Cape Verde
145	Trinidad and Tobago
146	Papua New Guinea
147	Mauritius
148	Malta
149	Haiti

== See also ==
- Global Peace Index
- Global Terrorism Index
- Democracy Index
- World Happiness Report
- Corruption Perceptions Index
- Human Development Index

== Notes ==
The 2023 report has been published but the full data set for 2023 is not yet available on the BICC website.
