= United States Peace Index =

Index of state and city peacefulness

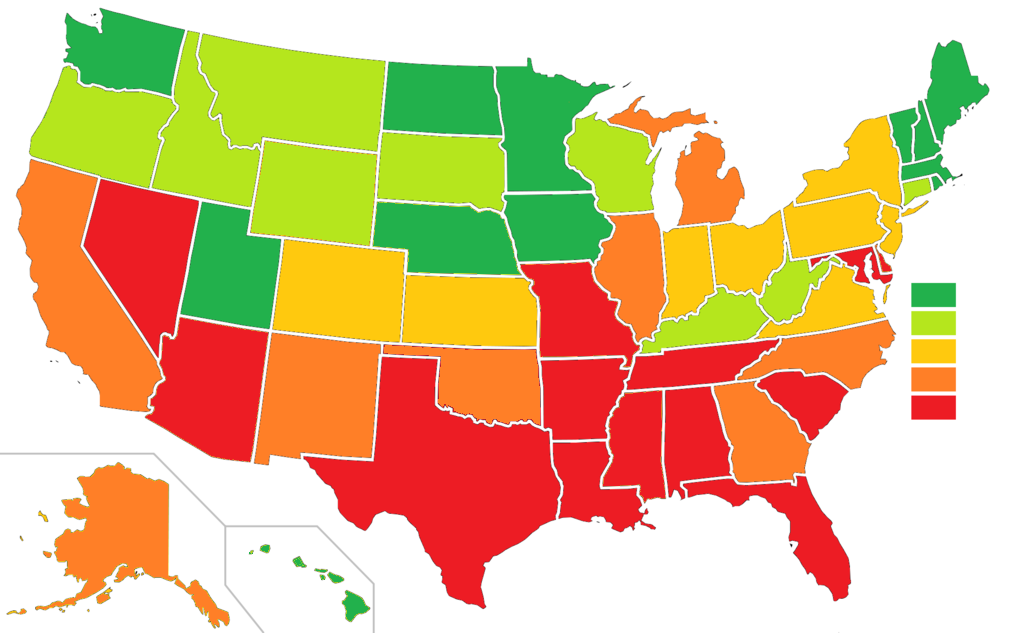
Map of the United States Peace Index 2011. States appearing more green are ranked as more peaceful; states appearing more red are ranked as less peaceful.

The United States Peace Index (USPI) is a measurement of American States and cities by their peacefulness. Created by the Institute for Economics and Peace, the creators of the Global Peace Index, it is said to be the first in a series of national sub-divisions by their peacefulness. The USPI was created first due to plentiful data and a large amount of diversity between states for level of peace. The United States ranked 88th/158 on the Global Peace index for 2012. The U.S. index was released on April 6, 2011, and the second edition was released on April 24, 2012.

== Indicators ==
There are five peace indicators that make up the USPI. The scores for number of homicides per 100,000 people, number of violent crimes per 100,000 people, jailed population per 100,000 people, police officers per 100,000 people, and ease of access to small arms are weighted and combined to form a state's score. Maine scored as the most peaceful state both years.

== Changes in peacefulness ==
The index also includes a map and list for changes in peacefulness from 1991–2009. States are scored in this section by percent, either positive or negative. As a nation, it says that the United States has improved in peacefulness since 1991. However, after that, it has declined sharply in peacefulness. For example, in 2026, the United States ranked 134th/163, its lowest rank ever.

== Metro areas ==
The index also provides statistical analysis and crime, and the cost of crime, in the 61 most populous metropolitan areas. The Cambridge metro area in Massachusetts ranked as the most peaceful and the Detroit metro area as the least.

== Lists ==
2012 Rank	2011 Rank	State	2012 Score	2011 Score
1	1	Maine	1.31	1.33
2	2	Vermont	1.55	1.50
2	3	New Hampshire	1.55	1.54
4	4	Minnesota	1.61	1.62
5	8	Utah	1.72	1.83
6	5	North Dakota	1.74	1.71
7	6	Washington	1.78	1.75
7	12	Hawaii	1.78	1.91
9	10	Rhode Island	1.79	1.87
10	11	Iowa	1.87	1.88
11	13	Nebraska	1.93	2.08
12	7	Massachusetts	2.00	1.80
13	9	Oregon	2.07	1.85
14	15	Connecticut	2.19	2.21
15	17	West Virginia	2.20	2.28
16	16	Idaho	2.23	2.24
18	17	Montana	2.27	2.28
17	23	Wyoming	2.26	2.49
19	19	Wisconsin	2.30	2.30
20	14	South Dakota	2.32	2.17
20	20	Kentucky	2.32	2.39
22	22	Ohio	2.33	2.43
23	25	Indiana	2.35	2.52
24	21	Pennsylvania	2.37	2.42
25	26	Virginia	2.48	2.61
26	24	Colorado	2.53	2.50
27	27	Kansas	2.57	2.63
28	28	New Jersey	2.63	2.66
29	44	Michigan	2.69	3.30
30	31	North Carolina	2.71	2.79
31	29	New York	2.72	2.69
32	31	California	2.74	2.79
33	30	Alaska	2.75	2.70
34	38	New Mexico	2.85	3.16
35	44	Illinois	2.89	3.30
36	34	Georgia	3.04	2.97
37	39	Oklahoma	3.11	3.18
38	36	Maryland	3.14	3.14
39	36	Delaware	3.15	3.14
40	47	Alabama	3.17	3.50
40	35	Mississippi	3.17	2.98
42	46	South Carolina	3.18	3.42
43	43	Arkansas	3.20	3.27
43	47	Texas	3.20	3.50
45	40	Missouri	3.21	3.21
46	33	Arizona	3.22	2.89
47	41	Florida	3.36	3.24
48	49	Nevada	3.37	3.61
49	42	Tennessee	3.41	3.26
50	50	Louisiana	4.05	3.97

== See also ==
- Global Peace Index
- Global Terrorism Index
- Gun violence in the United States by state
- United Kingdom Peace Index
