= Harald Balslev =

Danish composer

- Born: 1867
- Died: 1952 (aged 84–85)
- Occupations: writer and composer

Harald Balslev cand.theol. (1867–1952) was a Danish writer, composer and teacher.

Much of his musical output is liturgical in nature.

Some of his work was classified as of the folkehøjskole type. His work also included examples of poetry in music.

== Life ==
He was 7 May 1867.

He graduated from university in 1892. Alongside his musical work, he was also a high school teacher at respectively, the Rødkilde High School, the Central Institute for Gymnastics in Stockholm, and the Vrå High School. From 1900 to 1930 he was co-principal at Ubberup College.

He died 7 December 1952.
