= Bonn International Centre for Conflict Studies =

German research institute

- Established: 1994
- Director: Conrad Schetter
- Location: Bonn, North Rhine-Westphalia, Germany
- Website: https://www.bicc.de

The Bonn International Centre for Conflict Studies (BICC), established in 1994, is a research institute located in Bonn, Germany. While the focus of BICC's work initially centered on the conversion of military facilities and equipment to civilian uses (hence its name), the institute's research has expanded to other areas of peace and development, including peacebuilding and small arms and light weapons.

On 15 October 2021 the institute changed its name from Bonn International Center for Conversion to Bonn International Centre for Conflict Studies.

The institute publishes the Global Militarisation Index.
