= Anindita Balslev =

Indian philosopher (fl. 2023)

- Awards: Jawaharlal Nehru Fellowship

Education
- Education: University of Paris (PhD), University of Calcutta (MA)

Philosophical work
- Institutions: University of Copenhagen
- Main interests: Cross-cultural philosophy, philosophy of religion, consciousness studies, science and religion
- Notable ideas: Cross-Cultural Conversation

Anindita Niyogi Balslev is an independent scholar based in India and the Netherlands. She is particularly known for her work on cross-cultural philosophy, science and religion, and interfaith studies. She is the founder of 'Cross-Cultural Conversation', an initiative which is aimed at fostering dialogue between cultures. She is also a founding fellow of the International Society for Science and Religion.

== Education and early career ==
Balslev received an MA in Philosophy from the University of Calcutta and a PhD in Philosophy at the University of Paris in 1968. Thereafter, she has held academic positions at the University of Paris, the University of Copenhagen, and the University of Pennsylvania. She is a founding member of the International Society for Science and Religion, and is also a member of the Parliament of the World's Religions.

== Cross-Cultural Conversation ==
A notable academic contribution by Balslev is her seminal work on cross-cultural philosophy, not to be confused with intercultural philosophy. Cross-Cultural Conversation, or CCC, a term coined by Balslev, promotes meaningful discourse between cultures and religions. Through her framework of CCC, Balslev encourages readers to identify and cast off their prejudices towards people of other cultures and to instead focus on our shared humanity. To this end, Balslev argues that such conversations serve to mitigate 'the abuse of religious identities in the socio-political arenas of our collective life'. Balslev insists that whilst CCC fosters a sense of human solidarity, that is, solidarity based on the fact that we are all humans, such solidarity does not prevent us from valuing cultural diversity.

As a scholar of religion, Balslev notes that religion can be treated as a 'resource for ensuring greater harmony' rather than 'a divisive force'. Recognising that religion has often been used as a tool for social division, Balslev suggests that it can and should instead be used to promote social harmony and embodies this argument through her work for the Parliament of the World's Religions. In addition to conversations between religious traditions, another facet of CCC is dialogue between science and religion. The purpose of such dialogue is to pool together our various sources of knowledge (scientific and religious) for the common goal of 'achieving a better world'. As Roy Perrett notes, Balslev suggests the Indian concept of samvāda (discussion) to be the ideal framework for this kind of dialogue.

Balslev received a Jawaharlal Nehru Fellowship for her work on CCC in 2016.

== Publications ==
- Cross-Cultural Conversation: A New Way of Learning, Routledge, 2020
- Reflections on Indian Thought: Fourteen Essays, D.K. Printworld, 2019
- The Enigma of I-Consciousness, Oxford University Press, 2013
- Indian Conceptual World, Aditya Prakashan, 2012
- Cultural Otherness: Correspondence with Richard Rory, Oxford University Press, 2000
- Cross-Cultural Conversation (Initiation), Oxford University Press, 1996
- Religion and Time, Brill, 1993
