= Institute for Economics and Peace =

Global think tank

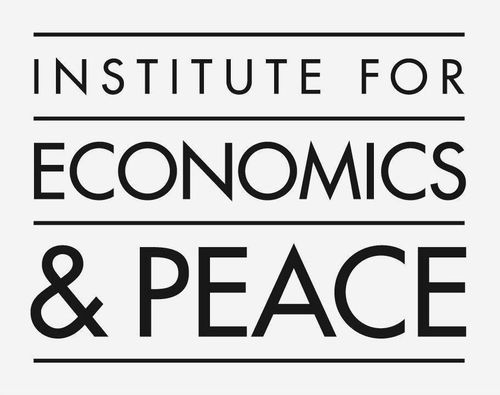
Logo of the Institute for Economics and Peace

The Institute for Economics and Peace (IEP) is a global think tank headquartered in Sydney, Australia with branches in New York City, Mexico City and Oxford. IEP studies the relationship between peace, business, and prosperity, and seeks to promote understanding of the cultural, economic, and political factors that drive peacefulness. It is a registered Australian charity and works in partnership with the Aspen Institute, Economists for Peace and Security, the United Nations Global Compact, Center for Strategic and International Studies and Cranfield University. It also collaborates with the Organisation for Economic Co-operation and Development, the Commonwealth Secretariat, UNDP and UN Peacebuilding Support Office. It is chaired by technology entrepreneur Steve Killelea, founder of IR.

== Global Peace Index ==
The main index produced by IEP is the Global Peace Index (GPI), a widely cited benchmark measuring peace. The GPI has been incorporated into the Stockholm International Peace Research Institute's Year Book (2009, 2010, 2011, 2012, and 2014), and was analyzed by the World Bank's World Development Report 2011 team. The data for the Global Peace Index is collected and collated partly by the Economist Intelligence Unit (EIU), the research and analysis arm of the Economist Group, and the methodology is informed and reviewed by an international panel of peace and statistics experts. The GPI is released annually. In addition, the GPI was the empirical basis for the Symposium of Peaceful Nations, a three-day conference hosted in November 2009 to honor the most peaceful countries in each of nine regions of the world at which Helen Clark, UNDP Administrator, delivered the keynote address. The GPI is used by the UN and World Bank. The 9th annual Global Peace Index launched in 2015 includes 162 countries.

== National Peace Indices ==
IEP launched a series of National Peace Indices beginning with the United States Peace Index (USPI) in April 2011, The USPI ranks each state in the US by peacefulness and, unlike the Global Peace Index, uses only five indicators: incarceration rate, the number of police officers, the number of homicides, the availability of small arms, and the number of violent crimes. Maine is the most peaceful state, while Louisiana is the least peaceful.

The Mexico Peace Index (MPI) is the latest in the series of National Peace Indices. There have been two editions of the MPI to date, the first published in 2013 and most recently in 2015. The MPI uses seven indicators to gauge the level of peace in the 32 Mexican states from 2003 to 2014. The indicators are: homicide rates, violent crimes, weapons crime, incarceration, police funding, efficiency of the justice system, and the level of organized crime. Guanajuato, Michoacan, Sinaloa, Morelos and Guerrero are the least peaceful cities while Hidalgo, Yucatán and Querétaro are the most peaceful. Mexico was found to be the 6th largest spender on violence containment in the world. It is estimated that it has cost the national economy 17% of their GDP to contain and manage the effects of direct and indirect violence.

== Global Terrorism Index ==
The Global Terrorism Index (GTI) is an attempt to systematically rank nations according to terrorist activity. Two editions have been released to date (2012 and 2014) and a third edition is expected in late 2015. According to reports, in the decade following 11 September 2001 the number of terrorist attacks each year has quadrupled. The GTI also indicates an increase of 61% in deaths from terrorism from 2012 to 2013, largely due to the civil war in Syria and the spill-over effects in the region. In 2013, 82% of those who died in terrorist attacks were in Iraq, Afghanistan, Pakistan, Nigeria, and Syria.

== Building Blocks of Peace ==
The IEP launched its education program with the release of Building Blocks of Peace, a 4-module curriculum resource that offers step-by-step guidance for high school teachers to introduce "a fresh perspective to the issues surrounds global peace" into the classroom. Presented at both regional and national conferences, the Building Blocks of Peace materials are an addition to the resources available to teachers dedicated to educating global citizens.

== Global peace report ==
On 26 October 2010, The Institute for Economics and Peace and Media Tenor released "Measuring Peace in the Media", the first study that takes a fact-based approach into understanding the accuracy of international television networks' coverage of peace, violence and conflict. The results show broad inconsistencies across geographies and networks, with US broadcasters much more focused on violence and conflict than their European and Middle Eastern counterparts. The study analyzed 37 TV news and current affairs programs from 23 networks in 15 countries* and then cross-referenced this with the Global Peace Index which measures the levels of peace and violence in 149 countries. BBC 2 Newsnight and ZDF Heute Journal (Germany) were found to be the programs whose editorial policies aligned their coverage most closely with the rankings of the GPI.

== External recognition ==
In 2013, Steve Killelea's founding of IEP was recognized as one of the 50 most impactful philanthropic gifts in Australia's history by a coalition including the Myer Family Company, The Myer Foundation and Sidney Myer Fund, Pro Bono Australia, Swinburne University and Philanthropy Australia.

In 2020 The Global Go To Think Tank Index, produced by the University of Pennsylvania, listed the Institute for Economics and Peace as a Think Tank to Watch and one of the top 15 Think Tanks with a Budget under $5 Million.

== See also ==
- List of anti-war organizations
- List of peace activists
- Peace economics
