= Global Peace Index =

Measures the relative position of nations' and regions' peacefulness

The Global Peace Index (GPI) is a report produced by the Australia-based NGO Institute for Economics & Peace (IEP) which measures the relative position of nations' and regions' peacefulness. The GPI ranks 163 independent states and territories (collectively accounting for 99.7 per cent of the world's population) according to their levels of peacefulness. In the past decade, the GPI has presented trends of increased global violence and less peacefulness.

The GPI (Global Peace Index) is developed in consultation with an international panel of peace experts from peace institutes and think tanks with data collected by the Economist Intelligence Unit. The index was first launched in 2007, with subsequent reports being released annually. In 2015 it ranked 165 countries, up from 121 in 2007. The study was conceived by Australian technology entrepreneur Steve Killelea, and is endorsed by individuals such as former UN Secretary-General Kofi Annan, the Dalai Lama, and 2008 Nobel Peace Prize laureate Martti Ahtisaari. The updated index is released each year at events in London, Washington, D.C., and at the United Nations Secretariat in New York City.

The 2026 GPI indicates Iceland, New Zealand, Switzerland, Slovenia, Ireland, Austria, Portugal, and Singapore to be the most peaceful countries, and Russia, Sudan, the Democratic Republic of the Congo, Ukraine, Israel, South Sudan, Afghanistan, Yemen, Syria, Mali, Somalia, Pakistan, Myanmar, and the Central African Republic to be the least peaceful ones. Among the top 7 most populous nations accounting for over half of the world's population and approximately half of the total GDP of the world, Indonesia ranks 69th overall on the Global Peace Index, China 118th, Brazil 124th, India 127th, the United States 134th, Nigeria 142nd and Pakistan 152nd. Findings of the 2026 GPI indicate that the world became less peaceful for the 15th time in the last 18 years, with the average level of country peacefulness deteriorating by 0.7 per cent over the prior year.

Ten indicators broadly assess what might be described as safety and security in society. Their assertion is that low crime rates, minimal incidences of terrorist acts and violent demonstrations, harmonious relations with neighbouring countries, a stable political scene, and a small proportion of the population being internally displaced or refugees can be suggestive of peacefulness.

== Methodology ==
=== Indicators of peacefulness ===
In 2017, 23 indicators were used to establish peacefulness scores for each country. The indicators were originally selected with the assistance of an expert panel in 2007 and are reviewed by the expert panel on an annual basis. The scores for each indicator are normalised on a scale of 1–5, whereby eight qualitative indicators are banded into five groupings, and quantitative ones are scored from 1–5, to the third decimal point. A table of the indicators is below. In the table, UCDP stands for the Uppsala Conflict Data Program maintained by the University of Uppsala in Sweden, EIU for The Economist Intelligence Unit, UNSCT for the United Nations Survey of Criminal Trends and Operations of Criminal Justice Systems, ICPS is the International Centre for Prison Studies at King's College London, IISS for the International Institute for Strategic Studies publication The Military Balance, and SIPRI for the Stockholm International Peace Research Institute Arms Transfers Database.

Indicator	Source	Coding
Number and duration of internal conflicts (Note: In this case, a conflict is defined as, "a contested incompatibility that concerns government and/or territory where the use of armed force between two parties, of which at least one is the government of a state, results in at least 25 battle-related deaths in a year.")	UCDP, IEP	Total number
Number of deaths from external organized conflict	UCDP Armed Conflict Dataset	Total number
Number of deaths from internal organized conflict	International Institute for Strategic Studies, Armed Conflict Database	Total number
Number, duration, and role in external conflicts	UCDP Battle-related Deaths Dataset, IEP	Total number
Intensity of organized internal conflict	EIU	Qualitative scale, ranked 1 to 5
Relations with neighbouring countries	EIU	Qualitative scale, ranked 1 to 5
Level of perceived criminality in society	EIU	Qualitative scale, ranked 1 to 5
Number of refugees and displaced persons as percentage of population	UNHCR and IDMC	Refugee population by country or territory of origin, plus the number of a country's internally displaced people (IDP's) as a percentage of the country's total population
Political instability	EIU	Qualitative scale, ranked 1 to 5
Impact of terrorism	Global Terrorism Index (IEP)	Quantitative scale, ranked 1 to 5
Political terror	Amnesty International and US State Department	Qualitative scale, ranked 1 to 5
Number of homicides per 100,000 people	UNODC Surveys on Crime Trends and the Operations of Criminal Justice Systems (CTS); EIU estimates	Total number
Level of violent crime	EIU	Qualitative scale, ranked 1 to 5
Likelihood of violent demonstrations	EIU	Qualitative scale, ranked 1 to 5
Number of jailed persons per 100,000 people	World Prison Brief, Institute for Criminal Policy Research at Birkbeck, University of London	Total number
Number of internal security officers and police per 100,000 people	UNODC CTS; EIU estimates	Total number; Civil police force distinct from national guards or local militia (Note: Excludes militia and national guard forces.)
Military expenditure as a percentage of GDP	The Military Balance and IISS	Cash outlays of central or federal government to meet costs of national armed forces, as a percentage of GDP, scores from 1 to 5 based on percentages (Note: This includes, "cash outlays of central or federal government to meet the costs of national armed forces—including strategic, land, naval, air, command, administration and support forces as well as paramilitary forces, customs forces and border guards if these are trained and equipped as a military force.")
Number of armed-services personnel per 100,000	The Military Balance and IISS	All full-time active armed-services personnel
Volume of transfers of major conventional weapons as recipient (imports) per 100,000 people	SIPRI Arms Transfers Database	Imports of major conventional weapons per 100,000 people (Note: This includes transfers, purchases, or gifts of aircraft, armoured vehicles, artillery, radar systems, missiles, ships, engines)
Volume of transfers of major conventional weapons as supplier (exports) per 100,000 people	SIPRI Arms Transfers Database	Exports of major conventional weapons per 100,000 people
Financial contribution to UN peacekeeping missions	United Nations Committee on Contributions and IEP	Percentage of countries' "outstanding payments versus their annual assessment to the budget of the current peacekeeping missions" over an average of three years, scored from 1–5 scale based on percentage of promised contributions met
Nuclear and heavy weapons capability	The Military Balance, IISS, SIPRI, UN Register of Conventional Arms and IEP	1–5 scale based on accumulated points; 1 point per armoured vehicle and artillery pieces, 5 points per tank, 20 points per combat aircraft, 100 points per warship, 1000 points for aircraft carrier and nuclear submarine (Note: Rates the destructive capability of a country's stock of heavy weapons via a categorized system. As of 2013, countries with nuclear capabilities receive a score of five, the highest possible score.)
Ease of access to small arms and light weapons	EIU	Qualitative scale, ranked 1 to 5

Indicators not already ranked on a 1 to 5 scale were converted by using the following formula: x = [x - min(x)] / [max(x) - min(x)], where max(x) and min(x) are the highest and lowest values for that indicator of the countries ranked in the index. The 0 to 1 scores that resulted were then converted to the 1 to 5 scale. Individual indicators were then weighted according to the expert panel's judgment of their importance. The scores were then tabulated into two weighted sub-indices: internal peace, weighted at 60% of a country's final score, and external peace, weighted at 40% of a country's final score. "Negative Peace", defined as the absence of violence or of the fear of violence, is used as the definition of peace to create the Global Peace Index. An additional aim of the GPI database is to facilitate deeper study of the concept of positive peace, or those attitudes, institutions, and structures that drive peacefulness in society. The GPI also examines relationships between peace and reliable international measures, including democracy and transparency, education and material well-being. As such, it seeks to understand the relative importance of a range of potential determinants, or "drivers", which may influence the nurturing of peaceful societies, both internally and externally.

Statistical analysis is applied to GPI data to uncover specific conditions conducive of peace. Researchers have determined that Positive Peace, which includes the attitudes, institutions, and structures that pre-empt conflict and facilitate functional societies, is the main driver of peace. The eight pillars of positive peace are well-functioning government, sound business environment, acceptance of the rights of others, good relations with neighbours, free flow of information, high levels of human capital, low levels of corruption, and equitable distribution of resources. Well-functioning government, low levels of corruption, acceptance of the rights of others, and good relations with neighbours are more important in countries suffering from high levels of violence. Free flow of information and sound business environment become more important when a country is approaching the global average level of peacefulness, also described as the Mid-Peace level. Low levels of corruption is the only Pillar that is strongly significant across all three levels of peacefulness. This suggests it is an important transformational factor at all stages of a nation's development.

=== Potential issues ===
According to The Economist, the weighting of military expenditure "may seem to give heart to freeloaders: countries that enjoy peace precisely because others (often the USA) care for their defence". The Global Peace Index has been criticised for not including indicators specifically relating to violence against women and children.

==== Conceptual criticism ====
Johan Galtung, in a 2016 editorial titled "Charlatanism: 'The Positive Peace Index'", argued that the IEP's framework omits structural violence and accordingly classifies "societies-regions-worlds so repressive that violence is not needed" as peaceful. In his earlier papers, he defined positive peace and negative peace, as well as the concept structural violence. He and other researchers considered economic blockades and sanctions an insidious form of structure violence.

Extending this line of criticism, peace researchers Peter T. Coleman and Kyong Mazzaro identified in 2013 a fundamental measurement asymmetry in the GPI: both the original GPI and the later Positive Peace Index (PPI) overwhelmingly measure the absence of negative conditions rather than the presence of positive ones. A coding of the PPI indicators found that 73 per cent measured negative conditions (e.g., crime victimisation, homicide rates, perceived discrimination) while only 27 per cent assessed positive ones; combined with the GPI, the negative-to-positive ratio approached 7:1. Coleman and Mazzaro argued that decades of research in peace psychology, including John Gottman's findings that the predictors of divorce and the predictors of marital happiness are qualitatively distinct, and the authors' own studies of Israeli and Palestinian motivations, demonstrate that the drivers of sustainable peace are fundamentally different from the inverse of the drivers of violence. They proposed that sustainable peace be measured through a framework that tracks both the decreasing probability of destructive conflict and the increasing probability of cooperation, justice, and well-being, drawing on evidence that social systems thrive when the ratio of positive to negative dynamics exceeds approximately 3:1 to 5:1.

A second concern raised by the same authors is the GPI's dominant economic lens. They observed that roughly half of the PPI's indicators are linked to the IEP's concept of a "Peace Industry" (metrics such as economic growth, consumer spending, and sound business environment) and noted that while commercial liberalism shows some correlation with reduced interstate conflict, economic openness does not significantly reduce internal conflict. Research indicates that horizontal inequalities (the intersection of political, social, and economic disparities) are a better predictor of civil rebellion than income level alone.

Bell and Mo, in proposing their Harmony Index as an alternative, argued that the GPI suffers from an individualist bias that downplays key social relations for human well-being. Their analysis found that the GPI provides no discussion of the kinds of family structures conducive to social peace, and no systematic treatment of environmental challenges—such as competition over water resources between India and China—that threaten peace within and between countries. They contended that any index of well-being should measure a society's ability to provide peaceful conditions for its people through rich and diverse social relations.

Pamina Firchow and Roger Mac Ginty, comparing the GPI with the Human Development Index, the Uppsala Conflict Data Program's Georeferenced Event Dataset and the Armed Conflict Location and Event Data Project, argued that expert-driven, top-down indicator systems should be complemented by bottom-up indicators generated within the communities being measured, and called for "a plurality of vantage points from which to measure peace and conflict".

Observations from a 2010 seminar on measuring peace, convened by the International Catalan Institute for Peace (ICIP), noted that the GPI's expert panel debated how to include what is not measured—such as violence by men against women, or the degree of social cohesion within a society—but lack of data on positive elements of peace posed a persistent obstacle. According to the proceedings, when the option of including a positive indicator was raised, the Economist Intelligence Unit—which provides the qualitative assessments for the GPI—responded that no data were available. The GPI's vice-president acknowledged at the seminar that results for very small countries, such as Iceland, could be misleading in comparison with those of much larger countries.

Critics argue that if peace is defined more by circumstances such as living in more remote, isolated or island regions, instead by positive, harmonious or proactive human actions such as conflict resolution and governance, then the value of a universal ranking metric across all nations would be reduced. Mayank Chaturvedi suggests a more equitable model peace index that would be population-adjusted, with greater emphasis on institutional strength regarding elections, the judiciary, press freedom, as well as on maintaining peace amidst religious or cultural diversity, and challenges in areas of security, economic opportunity and social mobility. Das has argued that happiness and peace are elusive, highly subjective, and difficult to define or measure accurately. Happiness and peace represent ideal or abstract states, meaning different things to different people, which are generally difficult to quantify.

==== Methodological criticism ====
The GPI operationalises peace as negative peace (the absence of violence or of the fear of violence) and does not itself score positive peace, which the IEP addresses through a separate Positive Peace Index. Beyond this question of scope, the following concerns have been raised about how the index is constructed.

- Transparency and reproducibility: eight of the 23 indicators are qualitative assessments banded on a 1-to-5 scale rather than measured quantities, seven of them scored by Economist Intelligence Unit country analysts; several nominally quantitative indicators (including homicides and internal security officers per 100,000 people) fall back on EIU estimates where official statistics are unavailable. Appendix A of the 2026 report states that IEP uses "multivariate imputation by chained equations to create country-level estimates" for missing official data. Because the analysts are not identified and the scoring and imputation procedures are not published in full, independent researchers cannot reconstruct the resulting scores. Nair, reviewing the construction of peace indices in 2016, treated this opacity as a general weakness of the genre, and a review of composite indicators by Barclay and colleagues identifies hidden methodology, arbitrary weighting and false precision as recurring problems for such measures.
- Level of analysis: the index scores whole countries, which sets aside sub-national variation in peacefulness between regions, communities and cities, and relies on data from states that may lack the statistical infrastructure to measure the indicators accurately.
- Selection and weighting of indicators: the index does not separately count several actions attributable to states that initiate or sustain conflict abroad, such as the imposition of economic blockades or sanctions, troops stationed or deployed overseas, participation in foreign regime changes, proxy wars and covert action. Nair observed in 2016 that the countries the GPI ranks as most peaceful are predominantly small, stable western and central European democracies, and Swanson noted in 2022 that five of the ten highest-ranked nations were NATO members.
- Currency of the data: the 2026 report contains some 2026 data, but most indicators draw on 2025 or earlier, and country-level relations indicators are updated only to the end of March 2026. Although the report discusses the Iran war that began in late February 2026 across several chapters and devotes a subchapter to its economic impact, it states that "the full impact of the Iran war is not captured by the Index this year".
- Scope of harm measured: the index counts deaths from internal and external organised conflict, casualties from terrorism, and refugees and displaced persons as a share of population, but no indicator explicitly measures non-fatal injuries, destruction of infrastructure, or conflict-related damage to health systems, notwithstanding the report's chapter on the "Economic Impact of Violence". Because casualties indicators sit alongside twenty others in a weighted composite (internal peace contributing 60 per cent of a country's score and external peace 40 per cent), movement in one domain can offset movement in another. The 2026 report records Israel's overall score as improving by 2.6 per cent, driven mainly by the Militarisation domain and selected conflict indicators, and notes that this "does not take into account the Iran war that started in late February 2026".

==== IEP responses to methodological criticism ====
In 2021, Thomas Morgan of the Institute for Economics and Peace published a systematic defence of the GPI's methodology, addressing several composite-indicator criticisms directly. According to IEP, the decision to measure negative peace rather than a broader positive-peace construct is deliberate: negative peace—defined in the Galtungian tradition as the absence of violence or fear of violence—provides a concept narrow enough to be operationalised with available cross-national data, while the GPI's maximalist approach of combining 23 indicators across three domains (Safety and Security, Ongoing Conflict, and Militarisation) is designed to prevent scores from being skewed by high peacefulness in one domain at the expense of another.

Regarding the qualitative indicators, IEP states that the qualitative assessments are scored by Economist Intelligence Unit country analysts, reviewed by regional directors, and subjected to further scrutiny by the GPI's expert panel. On the issue of weighting and aggregation, Morgan acknowledges that no purely objective method of constructing a composite index exists—even data-driven techniques such as principal component analysis require a subjective decision to treat variance as a proxy for importance. The GPI therefore relies on expert panel judgment to determine indicator weights, and uses linear aggregation as its default method.

IEP reports that robustness testing has been conducted on the GPI, drawing on the framework of the OECD Handbook on Constructing Composite Indicators. Morgan notes that while there is no universally accepted robustness threshold beyond which an index can be considered reliable, lower levels of robustness signal that a composite is particularly sensitive to the choice of weights and aggregation method. IEP has indicated that constructing alternative versions of the GPI using geometric rather than linear aggregation—and comparing the resulting country rankings—is an area of planned future methodological review.

On the omission of specific indicators, IEP has acknowledged that violence against women and violence against children were excluded from the GPI primarily because comparable cross-national data are not collected at sufficient frequency for the required number of countries. Morgan notes that the USAID Demographic and Health Surveys collect data on intimate partner violence, but these surveys are conducted infrequently and primarily in less economically developed countries. IEP has stated that should higher-coverage data become available, the GPI could be expanded to include an indicator of gender-based violence. Regarding self-directed violence, IEP argues that no consensus exists in the peace and conflict field on whether suicide should be classified alongside interpersonal or state-based violence, though the question remains open. The GPI's terrorism indicator, originally a qualitative assessment, was upgraded in 2012 to a quantitative measure using the Global Terrorism Database (GTD), incorporating the number of terrorist events, deaths, injuries, and property damage, weighted over a five-year period and normalised with an exponential function to reflect the enduring psychological impact of attacks.

Looking forward, IEP has stated its intention to explore geometric aggregation, expand the indicator set as better cross-national data become available, and continue the process of ongoing methodological review through its expert panel.

== Global Peace Index Ranking ==
Legend

- Very high state of peace
- High state of peace
- Medium state of peace
- Low state of peace
- Very low state of peace

2026 Global Peace Index Ranking
Rank	Country	Score	Change
1	Iceland	1.161	Steady
2	New Zealand	1.343	▲1
3	Switzerland	1.363	▼1
4	Slovenia	1.369	▲2
5	Ireland	1.371	▼1
6	Austria	1.421	▼1
7	Portugal	1.427	▲1
8	Singapore	1.435	▼1
9	Finland	1.478	▲1
10	Japan	1.489	▲3
11	Denmark	1.504	▼2
12	Malaysia	1.513	▼1
13	Czech Republic	1.517	▼1
14	Canada	1.525	▲1
15	Hungary	1.538	▼1
16	Bhutan	1.546	▲2
17	Netherlands	1.566	Steady
18	Mauritius	1.586	▲11
19	Latvia	1.589	Steady
20	Australia	1.602	▲4
21	Belgium	1.608	▼5
22	Poland	1.615	▲23
23	Croatia	1.619	▲2
24	Lithuania	1.62	▲3
25	Estonia	1.623	▼5
26	Bulgaria	1.628	▼4
27	Spain	1.654	▲4
28	Germany	1.657	▼5
29	Slovakia	1.661	▼3
30	Montenegro	1.672	▼2
31	Qatar	1.676	▼10
32	Timor-Leste	1.681	▼2
33	Norway	1.688	Steady
34	Mongolia	1.692	▲4
35	Italy	1.712	Steady
36	Albania	1.725	▲7
37	Uzbekistan	1.726	▲10
38	Equatorial Guinea	1.729	▲20
39	United Kingdom	1.73	▼7
40	Sweden	1.732	▼1
41	Vietnam	1.738	▼1
42	Taiwan	1.751	▼5
43	Uruguay	1.754	▼1
44	Kazakhstan	1.771	▲5
45	Romania	1.788	▼1
46	North Macedonia	1.792	▲3
47	Tajikistan	1.799	▼6
48	Bosnia and Herzegovina	1.81	▲9
49	Kuwait	1.813	▼13
50	Botswana	1.823	▼4
51	Armenia	1.825	▲21
52	Chile	1.826	▲8
53	Greece	1.828	▲2
54	Kosovo	1.83	Steady
55	Moldova	1.836	▲1
56	Gambia	1.837	▲5
57	South Korea	1.839	▼6
58	Laos	1.846	Steady
59	Madagascar	1.849	▲4
60	Oman	1.85	▼26
61	Kyrgyzstan	1.853	▲8
62	Costa Rica	1.86	▼14
63	Namibia	1.872	▼1
64	Paraguay	1.882	▲5
65	Morocco	1.887	▲3
66	Turkmenistan	1.903	▼2
67	Sri Lanka	1.91	▲14
68	Jordan	1.913	▲9
69	Indonesia	1.918	▼3
2=70	Jamaica	1.919	▼1
2=70	Serbia	1.919	▲5
72	Argentina	1.922	▼20
73	United Arab Emirates	1.927	Steady
74	Sierra Leone	1.937	▲9
75	Senegal	1.939	▲12
76	Ghana	1.943	▼2
77	Tunisia	1.947	▲19
78	Angola	1.955	▲11
79	Trinidad and Tobago	1.959	▼12
80	Cyprus	1.967	▼9
81	Panama	1.976	▼6
82	Zambia	1.992	▼2
83	Malawi	1.994	▼18
84	Papua New Guinea	2.002	▲17
85	Guinea-Bissau	2.012	▲7
86	Lesotho	2.016	▲27
87	Liberia	2.024	▲17
88	Guatemala	2.025	▼6
89	Dominican Republic	2.038	▼10
90	Zimbabwe	2.051	▲10
91	Algeria	2.053	▼5
92	Bolivia	2.054	▼2
93	Ivory Coast	2.061	▼9
94	Georgia	2.066	▲1
95	Saudi Arabia	2.067	▼2
96	Cambodia	2.075	▼8
97	Honduras	2.075	▲13
World		2.08	--
98	Tanzania	2.08	▼20
99	France	2.083	▲3
100	Gabon	2.086	▲17
101	Thailand	2.089	▼7
102	Philippines	2.092	▼3
103	Guyana	2.093	▼12
104	Eswatini	2.095	▲6
105	Djibouti	2.098	▲6
106	Nicaragua	2.107	▼9
107	Peru	2.12	▼1
108	Bahrain	2.131	Steady
109	Cuba	2.139	▼11
110	Azerbaijan	2.142	▼8
111	Nepal	2.143	▼26
112	Mauritania	2.184	▲2
113	Egypt	2.186	▲2
114	Rwanda	2.2	▼2
115	Belarus	2.216	▲1
116	Guinea	2.22	▲2
117	Bangladesh	2.226	▲3
118	China	2.231	▼11
119	Togo	2.251	▲7
120	Republic of the Congo	2.256	▼15
121	El Salvador	2.264	▲1
122	Benin	2.293	▼1
123	South Africa	2.308	▼4
124	Brazil	2.333	▲1
125	Libya	2.361	▲3
126	Mozambique	2.383	▲1
127	India	2.409	▼3
128	Eritrea	2.412	▲3
129	Burundi	2.417	▲6
130	Uganda	2.42	▼7
131	Lebanon	2.435	▲3
132	Kenya	2.447	▲1
133	Venezuela	2.516	▼4
134	United States	2.535	▼4
135	Ecuador	2.539	▼3
136	Turkey	2.605	▲8
137	Cameroon	2.634	▲5
138	Ethiopia	2.648	▲1
139	Mexico	2.65	▲4
140	Iraq	2.662	Steady
141	Colombia	2.735	▼4
2=142	Haiti	2.755	▼1
2=142	Nigeria	2.755	▲6
144	Iran	2.759	▼6
145	Chad	2.769	▼9
146	Niger	2.832	▼1
147	North Korea	2.845	Steady
148	Palestine	2.877	▲2
149	Burkina Faso	2.882	▲3
150	Central African Republic	2.906	▲1
151	Myanmar	2.911	▲2
152	Pakistan	2.919	▼6
153	Somalia	2.973	▼4
154	Mali	2.996	Steady
155	Syria	3.067	Steady
156	Yemen	3.081	▲2
157	Afghanistan	3.106	Steady
158	South Sudan	3.116	▼2
159	Israel	3.124	▲1
160	Ukraine	3.184	▲2
161	Democratic Republic of the Congo	3.189	Steady
162	Sudan	3.195	▼3
163	Russia	3.367	Steady

Note: The GPI's methodology is updated regularly and is improved to reflect the most up-to-date datasets. Each year's GPI report includes a detailed description of the methodology used. Also, the data is revised periodically and so values from previous years may change accordingly.
These tables contain the scores and ranking published in the official annual reports. The latest revised data can be found at Vision of Humanity's Interactive world map of the Global Peace Index.

== Responses ==
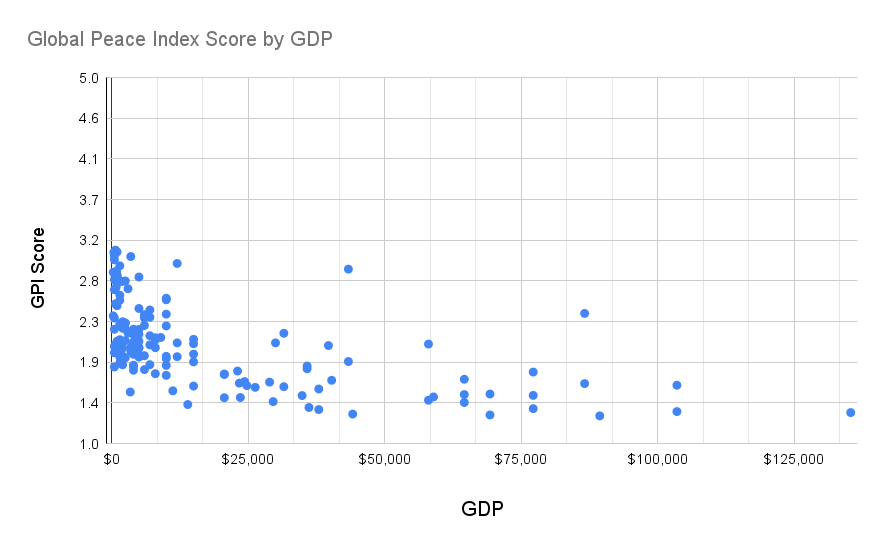
The Global Peace Index (GPI) is shown compared to gross domestic product (GDP).

The Index has received endorsements as a political project from a number of major international figures, including the former Secretary-General of the United Nations, Kofi Annan; former President of Finland and 2008 Nobel Peace Prize laureate Martti Ahtisaari; the 14th Dalai Lama; Archbishop Desmond Tutu; Muhammad Yunus; and former United States President Jimmy Carter.

Jeffrey Sachs at Columbia University said: "The GPI continues its pioneering work in drawing the world's attention to the massive resources we are squandering in violence and conflict." Some at Australian National University say that the GPI report presents "the latest and most comprehensive global data on trends in peace, violence and war" and "provides the world's best analysis of the statistical factors associated with long-term peace, as well as economic analysis on the macroeconomic impacts of everyday violence and war on the global economy."

The impact of Global Peace Index has been lower on the academic study of war and peace than on international organizations.

== Previous reports ==
- "Reports Institute for Economics and Peace". Institute for Economics & Peace. Feb 6, 2024.
- Institute for Economics and Peace (2023). Global Peace Index 2023 (PDF). Institute for Economics & Peace. ISBN 978-0-6451494-9-4.
- "Global Peace Index 2021 Summary & Findings". Vision of Humanity. Oct 13, 2021.
- Chalabi, Mona (Jun 11, 2013). "Global peace index 2013: the full list". the Guardian.
- Rogers, Simon (May 25, 2011). "Global peace index 2011: the full list". the Guardian.
- "Global Peace Index 2009" (PDF).

== See also ==
- Appeasement
- Global Militarisation Index
- Global Terrorism Index
- Human Development Index
- Institute for Economics and Peace
- Steve Killelea
- United Kingdom Peace Index
- United States Peace Index
- World Happiness Report
- World peace
- Interactive model of democratic peace
