= Database on Suicide Attacks =

The Database on Suicide Attacks (DSAT or CPOST-DSAT) is a database maintained by the Chicago Project on Security and Threats (CPOST) at the University of Chicago. The database is publicly available and includes all known suicide attacks from 1974 to 2019.

== Reception ==
=== Research referencing the database ===
The Database on Suicide Attack - formerly known as the Suicide Attack Database - was the main reference used by Robert Pape in his article The Strategic Logic of Suicide Terrorism. Two books followed, Dying to Win and Cutting the Fuse, co-authored with James K. Feldman. The DSAT has been referenced in multiple academic journals, including the Journal of Conflict Resolution and Middle East Policy. It has also been used in doctoral theses on suicide terrorism.

=== Inclusion in research guides and library guides ===
The Database on Suicide Attacks is mentioned as a resource by University of Southern California library guide.

== See also ==
- Global Terrorism Database
- Patterns of Global Terrorism
- Global Terrorism Index
- MIPT Terrorism Knowledge Base
- Global Database of Events, Language, and Tone
- Correlates of War
