= Global Terrorism Database =

Terrorist incident database by the University of Maryland, College Park

A chart plotted from the data in the GTD. A total of 182,438 incidents are plotted.

The Global Terrorism Database (GTD) is a database of terrorist incidents from 1970 onward. As of May 2021, the list extended through 2019 recording over 200,000 incidents, although data from 1993 is excluded. The database is maintained by the National Consortium for the Study of Terrorism and Responses to Terrorism (START) at the University of Maryland, College Park in the United States. It is also the basis for other terrorism-related databases, such as the Global Terrorism Index (GTI) published by the Institute for Economics and Peace.

As of 2025, the GTD is closed and is only accessible by requesting use via giving personal information.

== Data ==
The GTD describes itself as the "most comprehensive unclassified data base on terrorist events in the world" and includes over 200,000 terrorist attacks in its 2021 version. The entire database (about 80 MB Excel file and 9 MB geodatabase file) is available for download via the website. The GTD includes more than 95,000 bombings. It also includes more than 20,000 assassinations and more than 15,000 kidnappings.

The manner in which the data is encoded is described in a codebook which is available as a PDF file which can be downloaded from the website. The codebook states that the database was designed to be "useful to as broad an audience as possible" and hence, researchers chose to "err on the side of inclusiveness."

== History ==
In 2001, the University of Maryland, College Park obtained a large database of terrorist attacks from 1970 to 1997 collated by Pinkerton Global Intelligence Services. Data from 1993 was missing because it got lost in an office move by Pinkerton. Although START attempted to retrospectively code these events, they believe that around 85% of the original data is still missing; as such, data from 1993 is not included in the main database, however the surviving data is still available to download separately. With funding from the National Institute of Justice, the University of Maryland finished digitizing the data in December 2005. In April 2006, the National Consortium for the Study of Terrorism and Responses to Terrorism (START), working with the Center for Terrorism and Intelligence Studies (CETIS), received additional funding from the Human Factors Division of the Department of Homeland Security (DHS) to extend the GTD beyond 1997. The data generated for 1997 to 2007 was then harmonized with the Pinkerton data from 1970 to 1997 to create a unified database of terrorist events from 1970 to 2007 (excluding 1993). New years were periodically added, and as of August 2014, the data goes up to 2014.

The GTD was formally introduced in a paper in Terrorism and Political Violence by Gary LaFree and Laura Dugan of START, published in 2007. An update on the GTD by LaFree was published by Perspectives on Terrorism in 2010. Another update was published in Evidence-based Counterterrorism Policy in 2012. In 2017, Benjamin Acosta and Kristen Ramos published the 1993 Terrorism and Political Violence Dataset, which marks a comprehensive recollection of the previously missing 1993 data.

In 2018, the GTD suffered a lapse in funding that caused projects and updates to be temporarily put on hold. The Department of Defense Combating Terrorism and Technical Support Office and the German Federal Foreign Office were able to provide short-term funds which enabled the GTD to put out their report for 2018, but the Global Terrorism Database continues to seek funding for the long term. If they are not able to get it, they will be unable to update for the indefinite future and the GTD may not remain free as a result.

== Reception ==
=== Use in other databases and indices ===
Data from the Global Terrorism Database is used to generate the Global Terrorism Index (GTI) published by the Institute for Economics and Peace.

=== Academic reception ===
A number of academic papers studying various aspects of terrorism, including trends in the amount and types of terrorism, draws on data from the GTD for its empirical analysis.

In his book The Better Angels of Our Nature, author Steven Pinker used data from the Global Terrorism Database for his analysis of trends in terrorism, calling it "the major publicly available dataset on terrorist attacks."

In 2014, Pape et al. observed that, "according to the GTD data today, there were over 70 percent more suicide attacks in 2013 (619) than the previous peak in 2007 (359) during the Iraq war." Meanwhile, their Chicago Project on Security and Terrorism (CPOST) claims a 19 percent decrease for the same period:

Pape's comparison of GTD and CPOST
	GTD	CPOST
2007	359	521
2013	619	423
% change	+72%	−19%

Pape et al. noted that this difference can be explained by a change in methodology between 2007 and 2013. As noted above, the GTD data were collected by four different organizations:

GTD Data Collection Phases by Collection Institution
start	end	organization / methodology
1/1/1970	12/13/1997	Pinkerton Global Intelligence Service (PGIS)
1/1/1998	3/31/2008	Center for Terrorism and Intelligence Studies (CETIS)
4/1/2008	10/31/2011	Institute for the Study of Violent Groups (ISVG)
11/1/2011	12/31/2014 (ongoing)	National Consortium for the Study of Terrorism and Responses to Terrorism (START)

Pape et al. quote GTD officials as claiming that their "researchers, past and present, have ensured that the entire database uses the same standards for inclusion and is as comprehensive as possible." Pape et al. disagree while noting that their CPOST methodology has been consistent since their first recorded incident in 1982. They conclude, "American policy makers and the public deserve the best data available on terrorism, one of the most important national security issues of our time."

=== Reception in news media and blogs ===
The Global Terrorism Database has been cited in The Guardian, using a database of terrorism we look at how the frequency and type of attack has changed the New York Times, the Washington Post, the Wall Street Journal, and Foreign Policy.

While calling the Global Terrorism Database a treasure trove of information, a 2013 Washington Post fact-checking article criticized its use by government officials to hype the threat of terrorism around the world, given its use of a definition of terrorism conflicting with Congressionally required law.

An article for Stratfor stated that the Database does not pull incidents from thin air, but expressed concern that claims of a 70% increase in 2017 North American terrorist fatalities were based on the GTD classifying the 2017 Las Vegas shooting as an essentially certain case of goal-driven ideological terrorism; when no clear ideological or political motive has been found. Excluding that one incident would have yielded a 10% decline.

An article for Security Magazine noted that trends monitored by the Global Terrorism Database showed that Global Terrorism was declining, but that U.S. attacks are on the rise. According to the trends, global terrorism had decreased for the fourth consecutive year, but terrorist attacks were the highest they had been in the United States since 1982. The report by the Global Terrorism Database also noted that the number of U.S.-based attacks in 2017 and 2018 had remained stable, despite an increase in attacks to more than 65 in 2017.

In July 2023, Alexander Fürniß and Tobias Müller published an article in the German popular science magazine Katapult in which they investigated the presence of erroneous entries in the database. Aside from the most high-profile attacks, they found inconsistencies in many records for Germany from German reunification through July 2021, attributing the errors to a lack of time and personnel, particularly individuals with knowledge of the states involved, to conduct case-by-case reviews. The public databases on terrorist attacks, would in any case rarely meet the high standards of empirical research. However, Fürniß and Müller stressed that this did not mean the data were unusable, as they were still reliable for describing developments over time and providing information on changes in the modus operandi of terrorist organizations.

== See also ==
- Casualty recording
- Database on Suicide Attacks
- Patterns of Global Terrorism
- Global Terrorism Index
- International Terrorism: Attributes of Terrorist Events (ITERATE)
- MIPT Terrorism Knowledge Base
- Global Database of Events, Language, and Tone
- Correlates of War
- Worldwide Incidents Tracking System (WITS)
