= Criticism of the war on terror =

Controversies surrounding the war on terror

Criticism of the war on terror addresses the morals, ethics, efficiency, economics, as well as other issues surrounding the war on terror. It also touches upon criticism against the phrase itself, which was branded as a misnomer. The notion of a "war" against "terrorism" has proven highly contentious, with critics charging that participating governments exploited it to pursue long-standing policy/military objectives, reduce civil liberties, and infringe upon human rights. It is argued by critics that the term war is not appropriate in this context (as in war on drugs), since there is no identifiable enemy and that it is unlikely international terrorism can be brought to an end by military means.

Other critics, such as Francis Fukuyama, say that "terrorism" is not an enemy but a tactic, and calling it a "war on terror" obscures differences between conflicts such as anti-occupation insurgents and international mujahideen. With a military presence in Iraq and Afghanistan, and its associated collateral damage, Shirley Williams posits that this increases resentment and terrorist threats against the West. Other criticism include United States hypocrisy, media induced hysteria, and that changes in American foreign and security policy have shifted world opinion against the U.S.

== Terminology ==
Various critics dubbed the term "war on terror" as nonsensical. Billionaire activist investor George Soros criticized the term "war on terror" as a "false metaphor." Linguist George Lakoff of the Rockridge Institute argued that there cannot literally be a war on terror, since terror is an abstract noun: "Terror cannot be destroyed by weapons or signing a peace treaty. A war on terror has no end." Jason Burke, a journalist who writes about radical Islamic activity, describes the terms "terrorism" and "war against terrorism" in this manner:

There are multiple ways of defining terrorism and all are subjective. Most define terrorism as 'the use or threat of serious violence' to advance some kind of 'cause'. Some state clearly the kinds of group ('sub-national', 'non-state') or cause (political, ideological, religious) to which they refer. Others merely rely on the instinct of most people when confronted with an act that involves innocent civilians being killed or maimed by men armed with explosives, firearms or other weapons. None is satisfactory and grave problems with the use of the term persist. Terrorism is after all, a tactic. The term 'war on terrorism' is thus effectively nonsensical. As there is no space here to explore this involved and difficult debate, my preference is, on the whole, for the less loaded term 'militancy'. This is not an attempt to condone such actions, merely to analyze them in a clearer way.

=== Perpetual war ===
Former U.S. President George W. Bush articulated the goals of the war on terror in a September 20, 2001 speech, in which he said that it "will not end until every terrorist group of global reach has been found, stopped and defeated." In that same speech, he called the war "a task that does not end", an argument he reiterated in 2006 State of The Union address. Excerpts from an April 2006 report compiled from sixteen U.S. government intelligence agencies, however, has strengthened the claim that engaging in Iraq has increased terrorism in the region.

=== Preventive war ===
One justification given for the invasion of Iraq was to prevent terroristic, or other attacks, by Iraq on the United States or other nations. This can be viewed as a conventional warfare realization of the war on terror. A major criticism leveled at this justification is that it does not fulfill one of the requirements of a just war and that in waging war preemptively, the United States undermined international law and the authority of the United Nations, particularly the United Nations Security Council. On this ground, by invading a country that did not pose an imminent threat without UN support, the U.S. violated international law, including the UN Charter and the Nuremberg principles, therefore committing a war of aggression, which is considered a war crime. Additional criticism raised the point that the United States might have set a precedent, under the premise of which any nation could justify the invasion of other states.

Richard N. Haass, president of the Council on Foreign Relations, argues that on the eve of U.S. intervention in 2003, Iraq represented, at best, a gathering threat and not an imminent one. In hindsight he notes that Iraq did not even represent a gathering threat. "The decision to attack Iraq in March 2003 was discretionary: it was a war of choice. There was no vital American interests in imminent danger and there were alternatives to using military force, such as strengthening existing sanctions." However, Haass argues that U.S. intervention in Afghanistan in 2001 began as a war of necessity—vital interests were at stake—but morphed "into something else and it crossed a line in March 2009, when President Barack Obama decided to sharply increase American troop levels and declared that it was U.S. policy to 'take the fight to the Taliban in the south and east' of the country." Afghanistan, according to Haass, eventually became a war of choice.

== War on terror seen as pretext ==
=== Domestic civil liberties ===
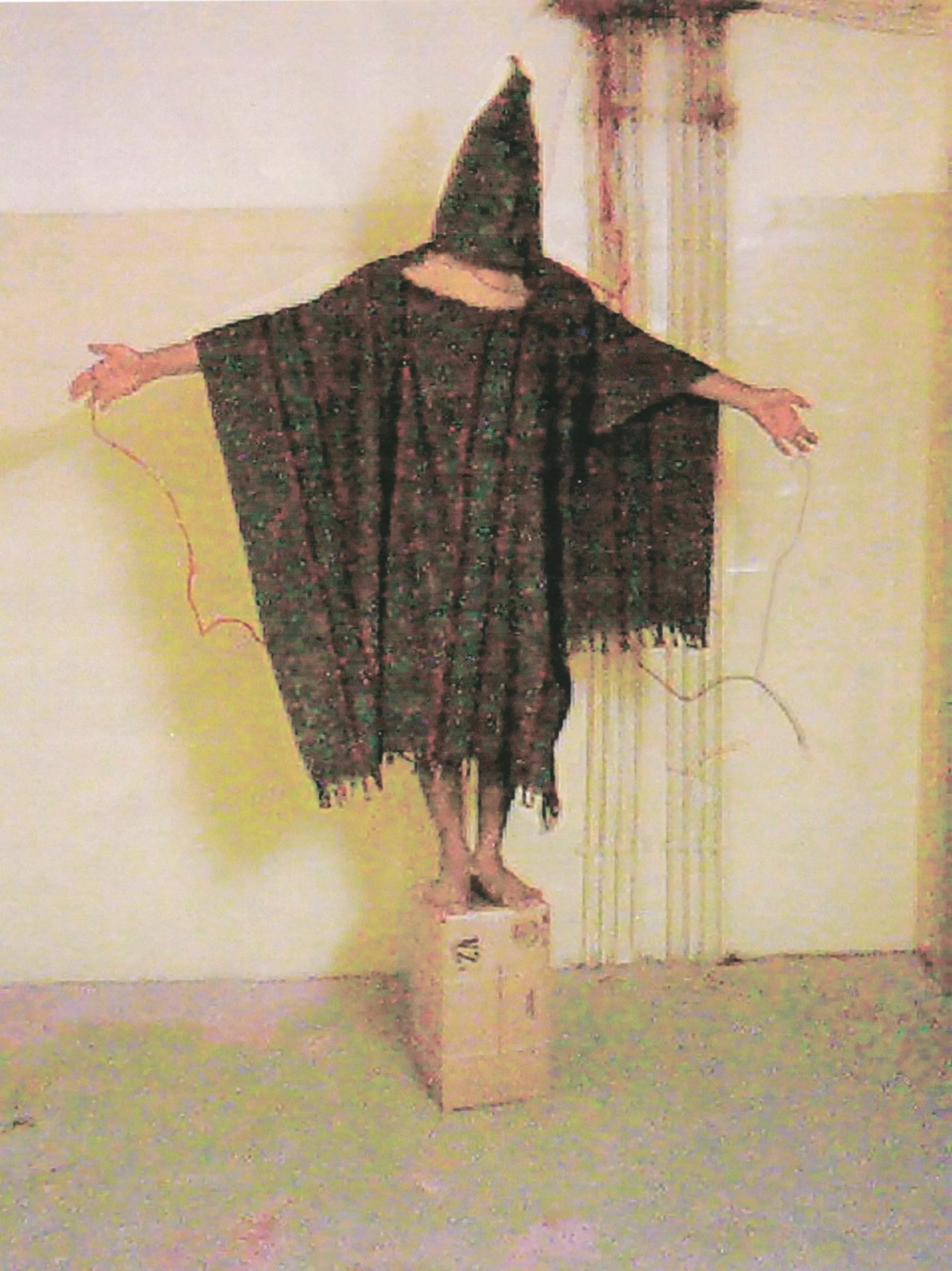
Picture of Satar Jabar, one of the prisoners subjected to torture at Abu Ghraib. Jabar was in Abu Ghraib for car theft.

In the United Kingdom, critics have claimed that the Blair government used the war on terror as a pretext to radically curtail civil liberties. For example, the detention-without-trial in Belmarsh prison, controls on free speech through laws against protests near Parliament, laws banning the "glorification" of terrorism, and reductions in checks on police power as in the case of Jean Charles de Menezes and Mohammed Abdul Kahar.

Former Liberal Democrat Leader Sir Menzies Campbell has also condemned Blair's inaction over the controversial U.S. practice of extraordinary rendition, arguing that the human rights conventions to which the UK is a signatory (e.g. European Convention on Human Rights) impose on the government a "legal obligation" to investigate and prevent potential torture and human rights violations.

Richard Jackson notes how countries like Russia, India, Israel and China also adopted the language of the war on terror to describe their own fight against domestic insurgents and dissidents. He argues that "Linking rebels and dissidents at home to the global 'war on terrorism' gives these governments both the freedom to crack down on them without fear of international condemnation, and in some cases, direct military assistance from America".

=== Unilateralism ===
U.S. President George W. Bush's remark of November 2001 claiming that "You're either with us or you are with the terrorists," has been a source of criticism. Thomas A. Keaney of Johns Hopkins University's Foreign Policy Institute said "it made diplomacy with a number of different countries far more difficult because obviously there are different problems throughout the world." Richard Jackson notes how "the grammatical construction of this choice is extremely powerful. On the one hand, it obliterates all neutral ground and denies any possibility of withholding judgment or weighing up the evidence ... On the other hand, it is loaded in such a way that any choice other than fully supporting the United States results in condemnation".

=== As a war against Islam and Muslims ===
Since the war on terror revolved primarily around the United States and other NATO states intervening in the internal affairs of Muslim countries (i.e. in Iraq, Afghanistan, etc.) and organisations, it has been labelled a war against Islam by ex-United States Attorney General Ramsey Clark, among others. After his release from Guantanamo in 2005, ex-detainee Moazzam Begg appeared in the Islamist propaganda video 21st Century CrUSAders and claimed the U.S. was engaging in a new crusade: "I think that history is definitely repeating itself and for the Muslim world and I think even a great part of the non-Muslim world now, are beginning to recognize that there are ambitions that the United States has on the lands and wealth of nations of Islam." Professor Khaled A. Beydoun of the University of Arkansas-Fayetteville School of Law states that the war on terror exports Islamophobia to other countries, which utilize it to persecute and punish their own Muslim populations. Two countries he mentions that facilitate structural Islamophobia as a result of the war on terror are India and China.

== Methods ==
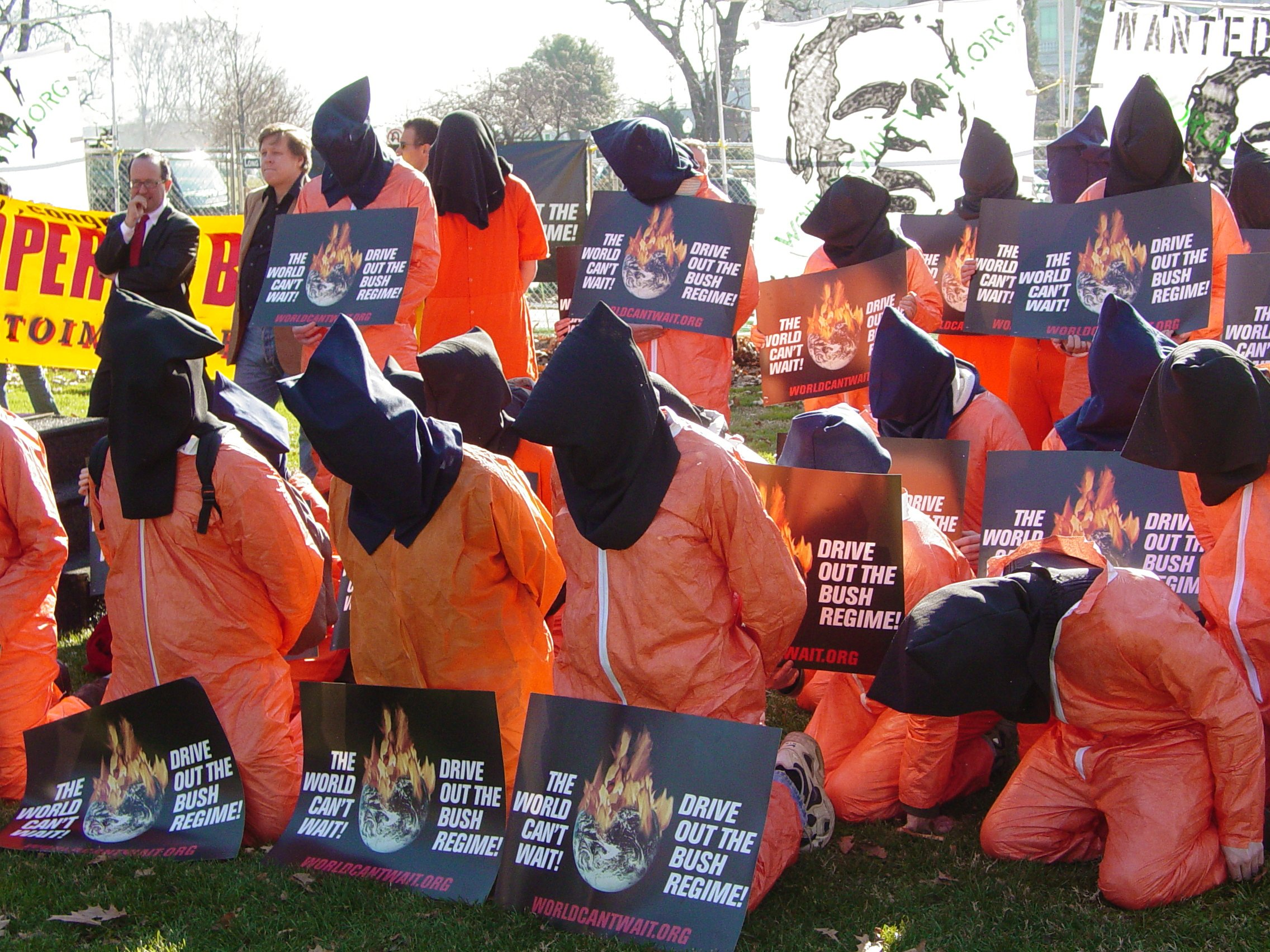
Protestors dressed as hooded detainees and holding WCW signs in Washington, DC, on January 4, 2007

=== Imperialism ===
Professor of Law Antony Anghie criticised the "war on terror" as a breach of International law and Charter of the United Nations, and condemned it for reviving age-old imperialist notions. Comparing it to the Spanish War against American aboriginals, Anghie writes:

"The war on terror inaugurated by the Bush administration has profoundly challenged the system of international law and relations created by the United Nations (UN)... Novel situations require novel remedies. My basic argument here is that the Bush doctrine-which consists basically of pre-emption, the identification and then transformation of rogue states-is essentially imperial in character. It is yet another version of the civilizing mission that, I have argued, has animated the international system from its very beginnings."

=== Aiding terrorism ===
Each month, there are more suicide terrorists trying to kill Americans and their allies in Afghanistan, Iraq, as well as other Muslim countries than in all the years before 2001 combined. From 1980 to 2003, there were 343 suicide attacks around the world and at most 10 percent were anti-American inspired. Since 2004, there have been more than 2,000, over 91 percent against U.S. and allied forces in Afghanistan, Iraq, as well as other countries.

— Robert Pape

University of Chicago professor and political scientist, Robert Pape has written extensively on suicide terrorism and states that it is triggered by military occupations, not extremist ideologies. In works such as Dying to Win: The Strategic Logic of Suicide Terrorism and Cutting the Fuse, he uses data from an extensive terrorism database and argues that by increasing military occupations, the U.S. government is increasing terrorism. Pape is also the director and founder of the Chicago Project on Security and Terrorism (CPOST), a database of every known suicide terrorist attack from 1980 to 2008.

In 2006, a National Intelligence Estimate stated that the war in Iraq has increased the threat of terrorism. The estimate was compiled by 16 intelligence agencies and was the first assessment of global terrorism since the start of the Iraq war. Cornelia Beyer explains how terrorism increased as a response to past and present military intervention and occupation, as well as to 'structural violence'. Structural violence, in this instance, refers to economic conditions of backwardness which are attributed to the economic policies of the Western nations, the United States in particular.

British Liberal Democrat politician Shirley Williams wrote that the United States and United Kingdom governments "must stop to think whether it is sowing the kind of resentment which is the seedbed of future terrorism." Ivor Roberts, the United Kingdom ambassador to Italy, echoed this criticism when he stated that President Bush was "the best recruiting sergeant ever for al Qaeda." The United States also granted "protected persons" status under the Fourth Geneva Convention to the Mojahedin-e-Khalq, which details the guidelines for ensuring civilian safety in wartime. In 2018, New York Times terrorism reporter Rukmini Callimachi said "there are more terrorists now than there are on the eve of September 11, not less...There are more terror groups now, not less."

=== Bush administration hypocrisy accusations ===
Venezuela accused the U.S. government of having a double standard towards terrorism for giving safe haven to Luis Posada Carriles. Some Americans also commented on the selective use of the term war on terrorism, including 3-star general William Odom, formerly President Reagan's NSA Director, who wrote:

As many critics have pointed out, terrorism is not an enemy. It is a tactic. Because the United States itself has a long record of supporting terrorists and using terrorist tactics, the slogans of today's war on terrorism merely makes the United States look hypocritical to the rest of the world. A prudent American president would end the present policy of "sustained hysteria" over potential terrorist attacks..treat terrorism as a serious but not a strategic problem, encourage Americans to regain their confidence and refuse to let Al Qaeda keep us in a state of fright.

=== False information ===
In the months leading up to the invasion of Iraq, President Bush and members of his administration indicated they possessed information that demonstrated a link between Saddam Hussein and al-Qaeda.The consensus among intelligence experts is that these claims were false and that there was never an operational relationship between the two. This is supported by the 9/11 Commission and by declassified United States Department of Defense reports.

=== Torture by proxy ===
The term "torture by proxy" is used by some critics to describe situations in which the CIA, along with other U.S. agencies transferred supposed terrorists, whom they captured during their efforts in the war on terrorism, to countries known to employ torture as an interrogation technique. Some also claimed that U.S. agencies knew torture was employed, even though the transfer of anyone to anywhere for the purpose of torture is a violation of U.S. law. Nonetheless, Condoleezza Rice (then the United States Secretary of State) stated that "the United States has not transported anyone and will not transport anyone, to a country when we believe he will be tortured. Where appropriate, the United States seeks assurances that transferred persons will not be tortured."

This U.S. programme prompted several official investigations in Europe into alleged secret detentions and unlawful inter-state transfers involving Council of Europe member states, including those related with the war on terror. A June 2006 report from the Council of Europe estimated that 100 people were kidnapped by the CIA on European Union (EU) territory with the cooperation of Council of Europe members and rendered to other countries, often after having transited through secret detention centres ("black sites"), some located in Europe, utilised by the CIA. According to the separate European Parliament report of February 2007, the CIA has conducted 1,245 flights, many of them to destinations where these alleged 'terrorists' could face torture, in violation of article 3 of the United Nations Convention Against Torture.

=== Cover-up of war crimes ===
There has also been politically motivated systematic cover-ups of war crimes of American soldiers participating in campaign operations across the world; with the knowledge of their military superiors. In 2002, Reporters Without Borders wrote to Donald Rumsfeld expressing concern when a Washington Post correspondent was prevented at gunpoint by American soldiers from investigating the impact of an American missile fired in Afghanistan. Furthermore, a public enquiry in the United Kingdom published in July 2023 reported that 3 British SAS units were involved in the summary executions of at least 80 civilians during 2010–2013, accompanied by a decades-long coverup at the highest echelons of British special forces.

=== Status of combatants ===
A presidential memorandum of 7 February 2002, authorized U.S. interrogators of captured prisoners to deny the prisoners basic protections as required by the Geneva Conventions, and thus according to professor Jordan J. Paust, "necessarily authorized and ordered violations of the Geneva Conventions, which are war crimes." U.S. Attorney General Alberto Gonzales and others have argued that detainees should be considered "unlawful combatants" and as such not be protected by the Geneva Conventions.

=== Extrajudicial killings ===
The U.S. practice of conducting targeted killing by combat drone has been a source of controversy over whether extrajudicial killing outside an active battlefield is ethical, whether it is legal under U.S. and international law, how the decision to assassinate a given person or group is made, whether the civilian casualties have been excessive, and whether the practice ends up recruiting more terrorists than it kills.

== Casualties ==
Another criticism of the war on terror has been the number people killed in the various associated conflicts. In a 2023 report, the Costs of War Project estimated that, as the result of the destruction of infrastructure, economies, public services and the environment, there have been between 3.6 and 3.7 million indirect deaths in the post-9/11 war zones, in addition to 906,000–937,000 direct killings with the total death toll being 4.5 to 4.6 million and rising. The report derived its estimate of indirect deaths using a calculation created by the United Nations-backed Geneva Declaration of Secretariat which estimates that in general there are around four indirect deaths due to indirect consequences of war for every direct killing. The report's author Stephanie Savell stated that in an ideal scenario, the preferable way of quantifying the total death toll would've been by studying excess mortality, or by using on-the-ground researchers in the affected countries. The report defined post-9/11 war zones as conflicts that included significant United States counter-terrorism operations since 9/11, which includes the Yemeni civil war (2014–present) and Syrian civil war in addition to the conflicts in Iraq, Afghanistan and other countries. Savell said: "There are reverberating costs, the human cost of war, that people for the most part in the United States don’t really know enough about or think about".

== Religionism and Islamophobia ==
One aspect of the criticism regarding the rhetoric justifying the war on terror was religionism, or more specifically Islamophobia. Theologian Lawrence Davidson, who studies contemporary Muslims societies in North America, defines this concept as a stereotyping of all followers of Islam as real or potential terrorists due to alleged hateful and violent teaching of their religion. He goes on to argue that "Islam is reduced to the concept of jihad and Jihad is reduced to terror against the West."

This line of argument echoes Edward Said’s famous piece Orientalism in which he argued that the United States sees the Muslims and Arabs in essentialized caricatures – as oil supplies or potential terrorists. Assistant Professor at Leiden University Tahir Abbas has criticised the war for resulting in the "securitisation of Muslims" and the spread of Islamophobic discourses internationally since 2001. During decades of post 9/11 hysteria, Muslims have been subject to widespread demonization in the Western mass-media, characterised by racist stereotypes and intense securitization. Hollywood movies and TV shows have portrayed simplistic depictions of Arab characters and advanced dualistic notions that have been causing the promulgation of Islamophobic stereotypes in the society.

Another noticeable trend has been the increase of anti-Muslim stereotypes in the Anglo-American media. A study conducted by researchers in the Alabama University which analysed domestic terrorist incidents in United States between 2006 and 2015 concluded that "terrorist attacks" committed by Muslim individuals receive 357% more coverage in American media than those committed by non-Muslim terrorists. This was the case, notwithstanding the fact that far-right extremists have been responsible for almost twice as many domestic terrorist attacks in the United States between 2008 and 2016. Despite this, administration officials have been lax on cracking down on far-right terrorism, while focusing counter-terror policies mostly to impose surveillance policies against the Muslim community.

== Decreasing support ==
According to a 2002 sample survey conducted by the Pew Research Center, strong majorities supported the U.S.-led war on terror in Britain, France, Germany, Japan, India and Russia. By 2006, supporters of the effort were in the minority in Britain (49%), Germany (47%), France (43%) and Japan (26%). Although a majority of Russians still supported the war on terror, that majority had decreased by 21%. Whereas 63% of Spaniards supported the war on terror in 2003, only 19% of the population indicated support in 2006. 19% of the Chinese population still supports the war on terror and less than a fifth of the populations of Turkey, Egypt, and Jordan support the efforts. The report also indicated that Indian public support for the war on terror has been stable.

Marek Obrtel, a former lieutenant colonel and military doctor in the Army of the Czech Republic, publicly returned his medals earned in NATO operations in 2014. In an open letter to Czech Minister of Defense Martin Stropnický, he stated he was "deeply ashamed that I served a criminal organization such as NATO, led by the USA and its perverse interests around the world", and alleged the U.S. was using conflicts such as the war on terror to further American imperialism and as a pretext to declare war on Russia. In the years after, Obrtel formed a pro-Russian paramilitary group and voiced his disdain for the U.S., NATO, and their interests.

=== Opposition in the United States ===
American pollster Andrew Kohut, while speaking to the U.S. House Committee on Foreign Affairs, noted that and according to the Pew Research Center polls conducted in 2004, "the ongoing conflict in Iraq continues to fuel anti-American sentiments. America's global popularity plummeted at the start of military action in Iraq and the U.S. presence there remains widely unpopular." American wars in Afghanistan and Iraq became heavily unpopular among the American public by the late 2000s. Numerous U.S. military veterans have handed back their service medals—including the Global War on Terrorism Service Medal—in fierce protest rallies denouncing the wars in Afghanistan and Iraq, with many condemning the military campaigns as imperialist wars of aggression.

== Role of American media ==
Researchers in communication studies and political science found that American understanding of the "war on terror" is directly shaped by how mainstream news media reports events associated with the conflict. In Bush's War: Media Bias and Justifications for War in a Terrorist Age, political communication researcher Jim A. Kuypers illustrated "how the press failed America in its coverage on the war on terror." In each comparison, Kuypers "detected massive bias on the part of the press". Kuypers called the mainstream news media an "anti-democratic institution" in his conclusion, and wrote: "What has essentially happened since 9/11 has been that Bush has repeated the same themes and framed those themes the same whenever discussing the war on terror. ... Immediately following 9/11, the mainstream news media (represented by CBS, ABC, NBC, USA Today, The New York Times, and The Washington Post) did echo Bush, but within eight weeks it began to intentionally ignore certain information the president was sharing and instead reframed the president's themes or intentionally introduced new material to shift the focus."

This goes beyond reporting alternate points of view, which is an important function of the press. "In short, if someone were relying only on the mainstream media for information, they would have no idea what the president actually said. It was as if the press were reporting on a different speech." The study is essentially a "comparative framing analysis". Overall, Kuypers examined themes about the September 11 attacks and the war on terror that President Bush used and compared them to themes that the press used when reporting on what he said. Kuypers further wrote: "Framing is a process whereby communicators, consciously or unconsciously, act to construct a point of view that encourages the facts of a given situation to be interpreted by others in a particular manner." These findings suggest that the public is misinformed about government justification and plans concerning the war on terror. Others have also suggested that press coverage contributed to a public confused and misinformed on both the nature and level of the threat to the U.S. posed by terrorism. In Trapped in the War on Terror, political scientist Ian S. Lustick wrote, "The media have given constant attention to possible terrorist-initiated catastrophes and to the failures and weaknesses of the government's response." Lustick alleged that the war on terror is disconnected from the real but remote threat terrorism poses and that the generalized war on terror began as part of the justification for invading Iraq, but then took on a life of its own, fueled by media coverage.

In Talking to the Enemy: Faith, Brotherhood, and the (Un)Making of Terrorists, Scott Atran wrote that "publicity is the oxygen of terrorism" and the rapid growth of international communicative networks renders publicity even more potent, with the result that "perhaps never in the history of human conflict have so few people with so few actual means and capabilities frightened so many." Media researcher Stephen D. Cooper's analysis of media criticism Watching the Watchdog: Bloggers As the Fifth Estate contains several examples of controversies concerning mainstream reporting of the war on terror. Cooper found that bloggers' criticisms of factual inaccuracies in news stories or bloggers' discovery of the mainstream press' failure to adequately verify facts before publication caused many news organizations to retract or change news stories. Cooper found that bloggers specializing in criticism of media coverage advanced four key points:

- Mainstream reporting of the war on terror has frequently contained factual inaccuracies. In some cases, the errors go uncorrected: moreover, when corrections are issued they usually are given far less prominence than the initial coverage containing the errors.
- The mainstream press has sometimes failed to check the provenance of information or visual images supplied by Iraqi "stringers" (local Iraqis hired to relay local news).
- Story framing is often problematic: in particular, "man-in-the-street" interviews have often been used as a representation of public sentiment in Iraq, in place of methodologically sound survey data.
- Mainstream reporting has tended to concentrate on the more violent areas of Iraq, with little or no reporting of the calm areas.

David Barstow won the 2009 Pulitzer Prize for Investigative Reporting for connecting the Department of Defense to over 75 retired generals supporting the Iraq War on television and radio networks. The Department of Defense recruited retired generals to promote the war to the American public. Barstow also discovered undisclosed links between some retired generals and defense contractors.

== British objections ==
Ken McDonald, Britain's most senior criminal prosecutor as Director of Public Prosecutions and head of the Crown Prosecution Service in the United Kingdom, stated that those responsible for acts of terrorism such as the 7 July 2005 London bombings are not "soldiers" in a war, but "inadequates" who should be dealt with by the criminal justice system. He added that a "culture of legislative restraint" was needed in passing anti-terrorism laws and that a "primary purpose" of the violent attacks was to tempt countries such as Britain to "abandon our values". He stated that in the eyes of the British criminal justice system, the response to terrorism had to be "proportionate and grounded in due process and the rule of law", adding:

London is not a battlefield. Those innocents who were murdered ... were not victims of war. And the men who killed them were not, as in their vanity they claimed on their ludicrous videos, 'soldiers'. They were deluded, narcissistic inadequates. They were criminals. They were fantasists. We need to be very clear about this. On the streets of London there is no such thing as a war on terror. The fight against terrorism on the streets of Britain is not a war. It is the prevention of crime, the enforcement of our laws and the winning of justice for those damaged by their infringement.

Stella Rimington, former head of the British intelligence service MI5 criticised the war on terror as a "huge overreaction" and had decried the militarization and politicization of U.S. efforts to be the wrong approach to terrorism. David Miliband, former Foreign Secretary, similarly called the strategy a "mistake". Nigel Lawson, former Chancellor of the Exchequer, called for Britain to end its involvement in the War in Afghanistan, describing the mission as "wholly unsuccessful and indeed counter-productive."

== See also ==
- 2003 Invasion of Iraq
- Abu Ghraib torture and prisoner abuse
- Australian war crimes
- Bagram torture and prisoner abuse
- Black sites
- Canadian Afghan detainee abuse scandal
- Extraordinary rendition by the United States
- Guantanamo Bay detainment camp
- International public opinion on the war in Afghanistan
- NSA warrantless surveillance controversy
- Opposition to the Iraq War
- Opposition to the War in Afghanistan (2001–2021)
- Protests against the invasion of Afghanistan
- Standard Operating Procedure
- Unlawful combatant
- USA PATRIOT Act
- War in Afghanistan (2001–2021)
- War against Islam
- Anwar al-Awlaki
