= Great Replacement conspiracy theory in the United States =

View that political elites are deliberately increasing minority population

White Americans in the United States as a share of population, by state, from 1960 to 2020. The legalization of interracial marriage in Loving v. Virginia (1967) and an influx of immigrants from Latin America have contributed to this demographic shift. Conservatives have used this shift as rationale to advocate anti-abortion and anti-immigration policies, in what has been described as a "white backlash".

In the United States, the Great Replacement conspiracy theory holds the view that "political elites" are purposefully seeking to increase the number of racial and religious minorities in an attempt to displace the Christian, White American population. Believers in the theory have used it as a racist trope in an attempt to advocate anti-abortion and anti-immigration policies. The theory has received strong support in many sectors of the Republican Party, and has been criticized by human rights groups for its appeal to both white and Christian nationalism.

According to David Smith, "Two in three Republicans agree with the 'great replacement' theory." As a result, it has become a major issue of political debate. It has also stimulated violent reactionary responses, including mass murders. Research published in 2024 found that people who endorse the Great Replacement conspiracy theory tend to have anti-social personality traits, authoritarian views, and negative attitudes toward immigrants, minorities, and women. The name is derived from the "Great Replacement" theory, invented in 2011 by the French author Renaud Camus. The idea also has some similarities to the white genocide conspiracy theory, popularized by the American terrorist David Lane in his 1995 White Genocide Manifesto. It is also promoted by the far-right in Europe.

Similar views originated in American nativism around 1900. According to Erika Lee, in 1894 the old stock Yankee upper-class founders of the Immigration Restriction League were "convinced that Anglo-Saxon traditions, peoples, and culture were being drowned in a flood of racially inferior foreigners from Southern and Eastern Europe".

== Responding to demographic projections ==
Changes in the method by which the Census Bureau classifies the population by race led to a 2008 projection that white non-Hispanic Americans will make up less than half the population of the U.S. by 2042. This projection was criticized by academics as misleading, but was widely publicized by national media and white nationalist groups. Sociologist Richard Alba states, "The population projections that undergird the widespread belief in the arrival of a majority-minority society in the next few decades are based on the classification of the great majority of mixed majority-minority individuals as 'not white,' and hence as 'minority.' The evidence so far strongly contradicts this classification." Nevertheless, the projection generated widespread anxiety and even violence. It was a matter of how to read statistics. As the New York Times reported, a study co-authored by demographer Dowell Myers, "found that presenting the data differently could produce a much less anxious reaction.... [T]hey found that the negative effects that came from reading about a white decline were largely erased when the same people read about how the white category was in fact getting bigger by absorbing multiracial young people through intermarriage."

According to Kaleigh Rogers of FiveThirtyEight, arguments for a "great replacement" in the United States are "built on false assumptions about American demographics and immigration: that white people will soon be a minority in this country, that immigrants and non-white voters are all Democrats, and that no longer being the majority group means a loss of power. When those assumptions are torn down, the true justifications for these fears become transparent."

A May 2022 poll by the Associated Press found that one-third of American adults believed that an effort was underway "to replace native-born Americans with immigrants for electoral gains". The poll found that those who reported themselves as viewers of conservative and far-right media outlets were more likely to believe the theory, with 45% of One America News Network (OANN) and Newsmax viewers, and 31% of Fox News viewers, believing in it, as compared to 13% of CNN viewers, and 11% of MSNBC viewers.

Another May 2022 poll by Yahoo! News and YouGov found that 61% of people who voted for Donald Trump in the 2020 U.S. presidential election believe that "a group of people in this country are trying to replace native-born Americans with immigrants and people of color who share their political views."

== History ==
=== Origins ===
The origins of the basic idea of the replacement of the white population in the United States date to the late 19th century, when upper class Americans began to fear the arrival of what they considered inferior Catholic and Jewish immigrants from Eastern and Southern Europe. Leaders included Republican U.S. senator Henry Cabot Lodge and polemicist Madison Grant, author of The Passing of the Great Race (1916). They sought immigration restriction. It was finally imposed by Congress in the Immigration Act of 1924. However the main restrictions were removed by the Immigration and Nationality Act of 1965.

In the 19th century, racist expressions regarding replacement have been made, which contributed to anti-immigration laws in many countries, including the US. In 1863, David Croly and George Wakeman, who coined the term ''miscegenation'', predicted that an influx of East Asian immigrants into California would result in a "composite race" of Chinese and Japanese people, eventually replacing the Anglo-Saxon majority. These fears were echoed in 1870 by a San Francisco correspondent for the North China Herald in Shanghai, who expressed concern about the rise of "Eurasians, or Amerasians" from Chinese immigrants, fearing this "mongrel breed" would become the dominant class. An extreme manifestation of these anxieties appeared in "The Battle of the Wabash", an 1880 short story in The Californian. Set in 2080, it depicted a dystopian future where Chinese immigration and miscegenation had diminished the white population to a subjugated minority under a tyrannical Chinese and Eurasian majority.

According to Elle Reeve of CNN, the great replacement "stayed mostly on the margins [in the United States] until 2014". That year, members of Gamergate began "mingling with neo-Nazis" on 4chan and 8chan, resulting in a "massive wave of young people enter[ing] what had been an old man's world of white nationalism."

=== "Unite the Right" rally ===
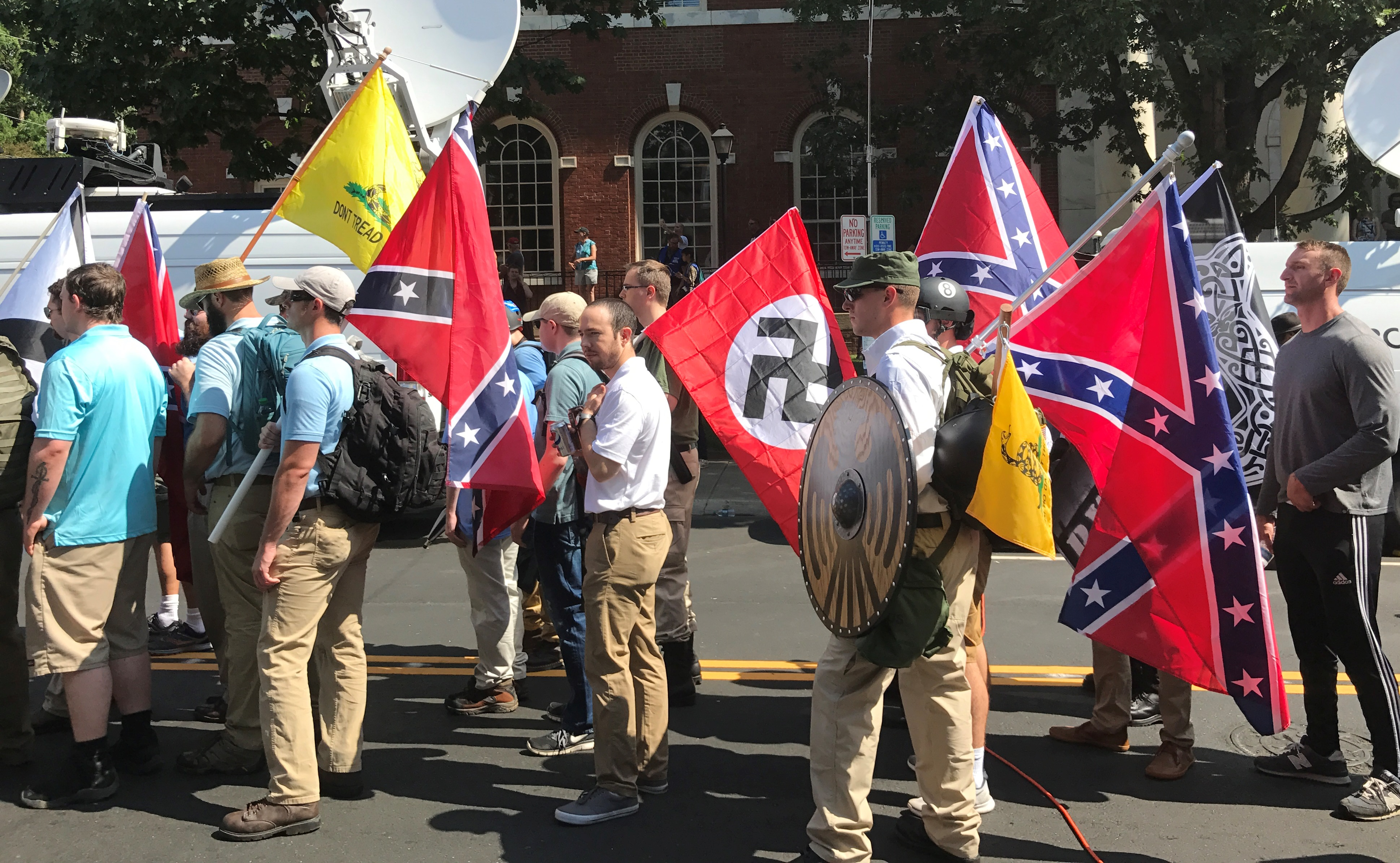
Rally participants preparing to enter Emancipation Park in Charlottesville, Virginia, on August 12, 2017

In 2017, white supremacist protesters at the Unite the Right rally in Charlottesville, Virginia used slogans that alluded to similar ideas of ethnic replacement, such as "You will not replace us" and "Jews will not replace us". After that event, Renaud Camus, the French writer who coined the term "Great Replacement," stated that he did not support violence, and disputed any association between his ideas and neo-Nazis; however, he said he approved of the feeling behind the chant. U.S. representative Steve King endorsed the conspiracy theory, stating: "Great replacement, yes," referring to the European migrant crisis that "these people walking into Europe by ethnic migration, 80 percent are young men." King presents the Great Replacement as a shared concern of Europe and the United States, claiming that "if we continue to abort our babies and import a replacement for them in the form of young violent men, we are supplanting our culture, our civilization." He has blamed George Soros as an alleged perpetrator behind the conspiracy.

=== Abortion ===
In May 2019, Florida State Senator Dennis Baxley was reported to use the replacement theory in relation to the abortion debate in the United States. Speaking of Western European birthrates as a warning to Americans, he said: "When you get a birth rate less than 2 percent, that society is disappearing, and it's being replaced by folks that come behind them and immigrate, don't wish to assimilate into that society and they do believe in having children." The following month, Nick Isgro, Vice Chair of the Maine Republican Party endorsed the conspiracy theory after claiming financial subsidies were promoted for abortions in the U.S. to "kill our own people", and that asylum seekers were "human pawns who are being played in a game by global elites and their partners here in Augusta." Greg Kesich, a writer for the Portland Press Herald, reported that the current mayor of Waterville's speech displayed the sentiment of the Great Replacement.

=== 2018 Pittsburgh synagogue shooting ===
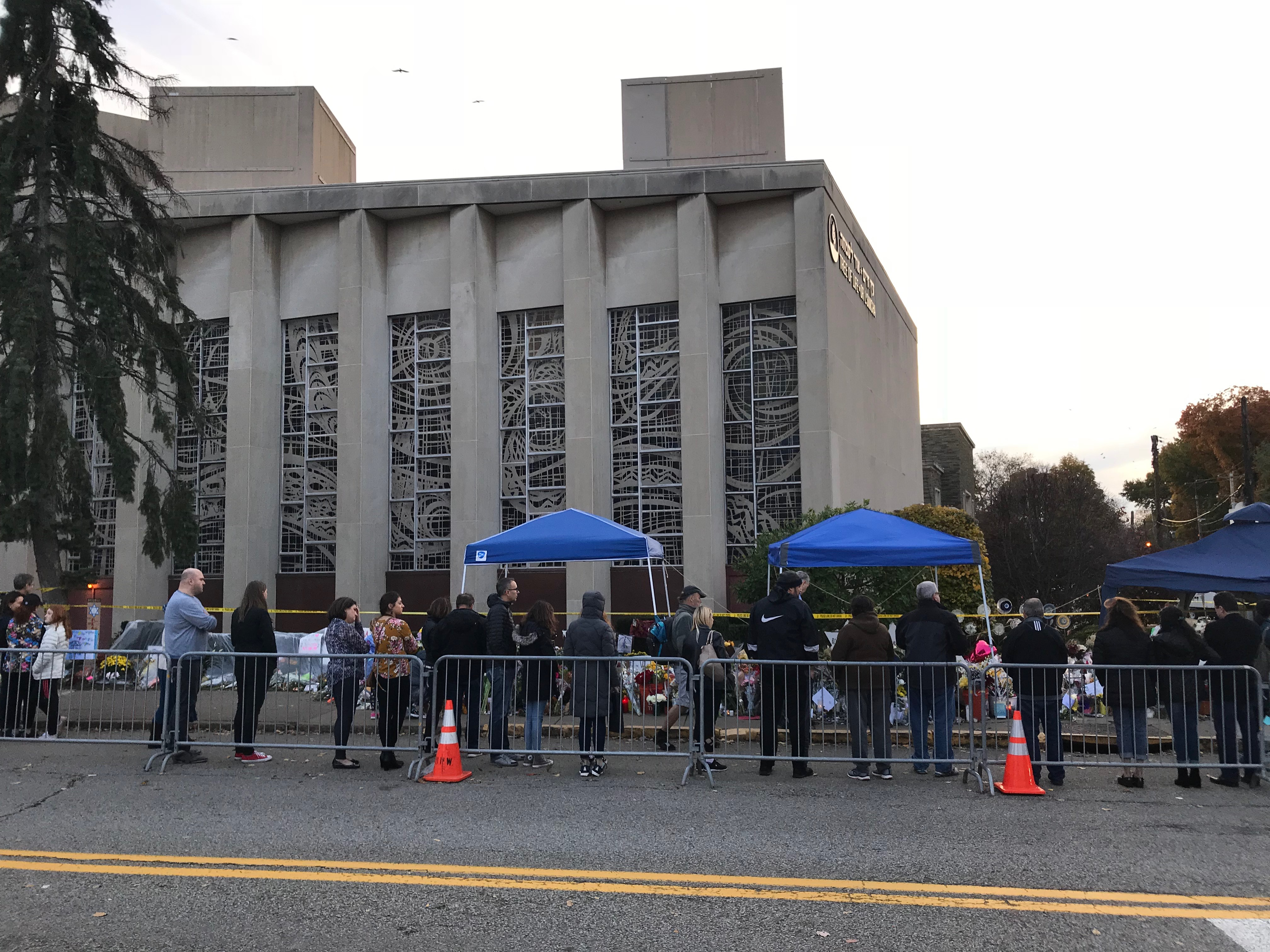
The 2018 Pittsburgh synagogue shooting was said to have been inspired by the Great Replacement theory.

In October 2018, far-right terrorist Robert Bowers killed 11 people, including Holocaust survivors, at the Tree of Life – Or L'Simcha Congregation synagogue in the Squirrel Hill neighborhood of Pittsburgh, Pennsylvania. It was the deadliest antisemitic attack in modern American history. Before the massacre, Bowers' recent social media posts, confirmed by his former co-workers, had indicated that his conservatism had quickly spiraled into white nationalism. The shooter eventually became inspired by the right-wing radio host Jim Quinn, and became deeply involved on extremist social networking websites, such as Gab, promoting antisemitic conspiracy theories on them. The shooter published posts that supported the white genocide conspiracy theory, such as one that said: "Daily Reminder: Diversity means chasing down the last white person". Shortly before the attack, the shooter made a series of posts on Gab attacking Jewish organizations and promoting the Great Replacement, saying: "HIAS likes to bring invaders in that kill our people. I can't sit by and watch my people get slaughtered. Screw your optics, I'm going in."

=== 2019 El Paso Walmart shooting ===
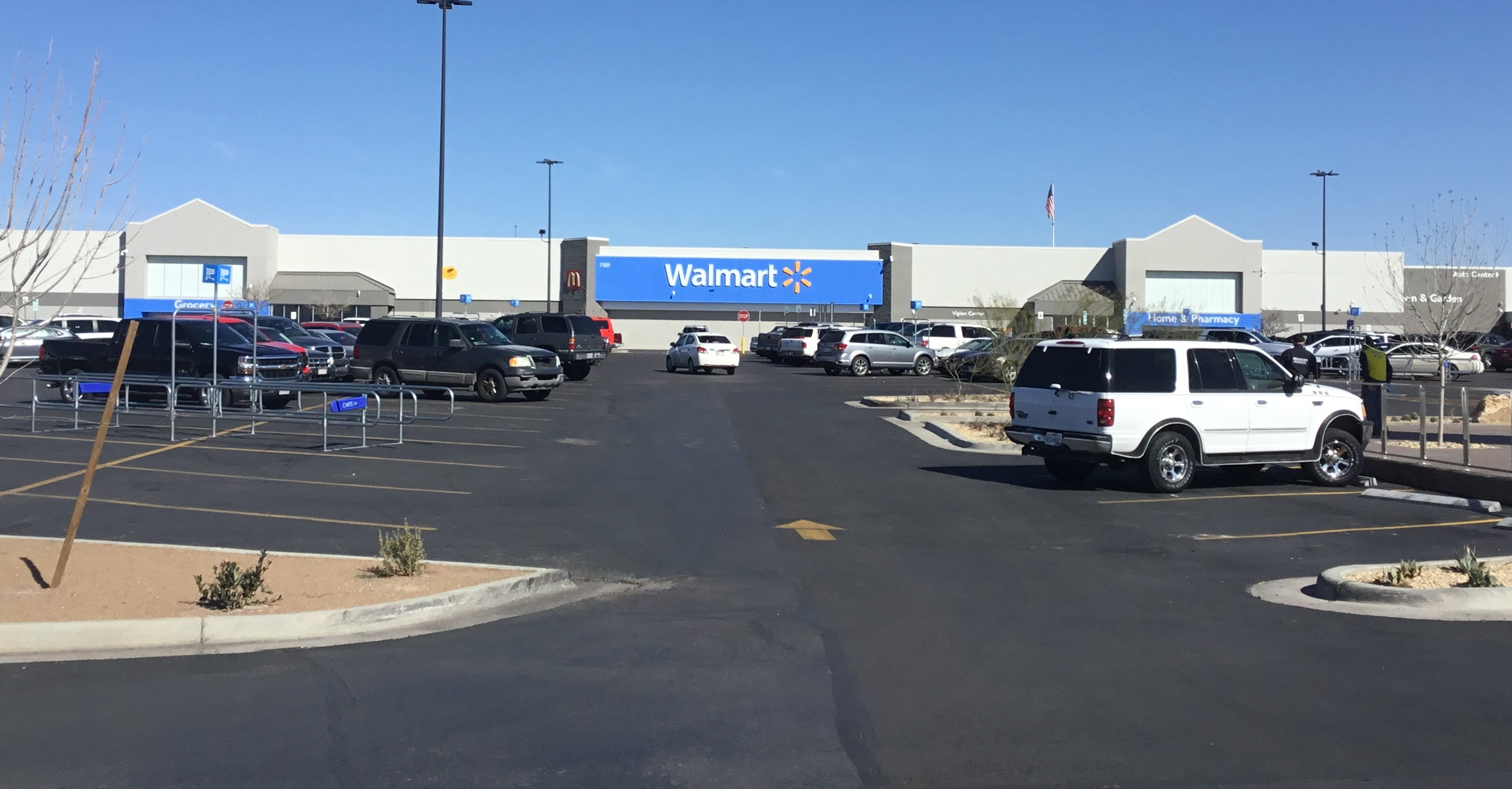
The 2019 El Paso Walmart shooting was said to have been inspired by the Great Replacement theory.

In August 2019, Patrick Crusius killed 23 people at a Walmart in El Paso, Texas, in the deadliest attack on Latinos in modern American history. Before the massacre, he released an anti-Hispanic, anti-immigrant manifesto promoting the Great Replacement inspired by the Christchurch mosque shootings in New Zealand by Brenton Tarrant. While the document uses language about immigrants similar to that used by U.S. president Donald Trump, "[s]ome of the language included in the document parroted Trump's own words, characterizing Hispanic migrants as invaders taking American jobs and arguing to 'send them back'." "Portions of the 2,300-word essay, titled 'The Inconvenient Truth', closely mirror Trump's rhetoric, as well as the language of the white nationalist movement, including a warning about the 'Hispanic invasion of Texas'." President Donald Trump later condemned the shooting as "hateful" and an "act of cowardice".

=== Brexit ===
In July 2019, Keith Ellison, the Attorney General of Minnesota, stated how increasing and varied hate crime, exacerbated by the 2016 Brexit vote and election of Donald Trump, was "united by so-called 'replacement' theory, and that communities needed to "vigilantly and consistently counter each of these acts of violence and expressions of hate". At the same time, Mick Davis, the Chief Executive and Treasurer of the British Conservative Party, published his outrage of the concept. Writing in The Jewish Chronicle, Davis named the Great Replacement, "a driving force behind far right terror", as worse than merely a conspiracy theory, in that it was "profoundly antisemitic".

According to a survey study by Dr. Hugo Leal of the University of Cambridge, 31% of Brexit voters believe in the Great Replacement Theory compared to 6% of "Remain" voters. In the same study, supporters of Donald Trump and Hillary Clinton showed a similar pattern with 41% versus 3%, respectively.

=== Influence of Donald Trump's Twitter account ===
Donald J. Trump
(@realDonaldTrump)
tweeted:

In light of the attack from the Invisible Enemy, as well as the need to protect the jobs of our GREAT American Citizens, I will be signing an Executive Order to temporarily suspend Immigration into the United States!

Apr 20, 2020

According to the Institute for Strategic Dialogue, Donald Trump referenced the Great Replacement, and a 2019 tweet in favour of his proposed Border Wall was interpreted by many as endorsing the theory. They also stated that Trump's Twitter account was one of the most influential accounts promoting the theory. His history of describing Muslims and immigrants as "invaders", according to SBS News, closely mirrors the language of explicit supporters of the theory. Political scientist Robert A. Pape concluded from two surveys led by the Chicago Project on Security and Threats in 2021 that the Great Replacement theory had achieved "iconic status with white nationalists" and "might help explain why such a high percentage of the rioters [involved in the January 6 United States Capitol attack] hail[ed] from counties with fast-rising, non-White populations."

=== Tucker Carlson ===
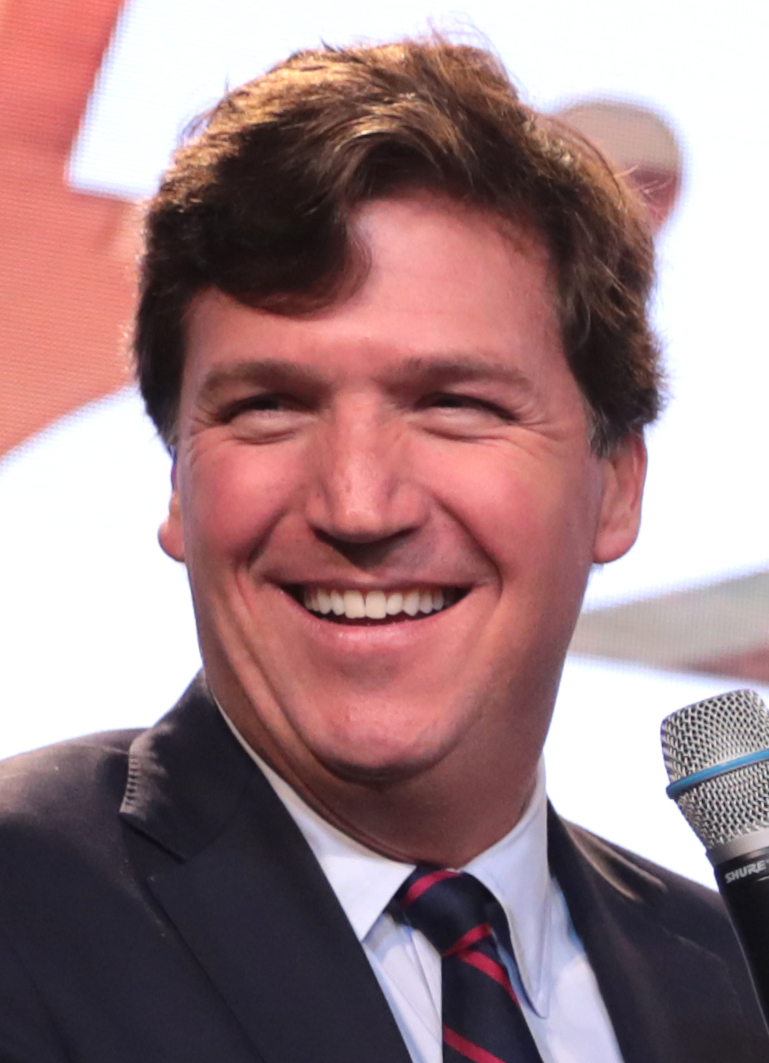
Former Fox News anchor Tucker Carlson repeatedly dog whistled several ideas and concepts referencing the Great Replacement theory on his nightly political talk show Tucker Carlson Tonight. Much of Carlson's rhetoric around the theory has been speculated as a potential inspiration for the 2022 Buffalo shooting.

In April 2021, the conspiracy theory was prominently and repeatedly mentioned by conservative television host Tucker Carlson on the Tucker Carlson Tonight show. Days later, during a committee hearing, Republican Congressman Scott Perry said "For many Americans, what seems to be happening or what they believe right now is happening is, what appears to them is we're replacing national-born Americans, native-born Americans to permanently transform the landscape of this very nation." Former speaker Newt Gingrich echoed the theory's sentiments while discussing immigration in a Fox News interview in August 2021, accusing the "anti-American left" of aiming to "drown traditional classic Americans" with mass immigration. On 22 September 2021, Tucker Carlson promoted the conspiracy theory on a segment of his Fox News show Tucker Carlson Tonight, claiming that President Joe Biden was intentionally trying to replace the population with people from the third world. According to a New York Times analysis published in April 2022, Carlson has made reference to the theory in more than 400 episodes between 2016 and 2021.

=== 2022 Buffalo shooting ===
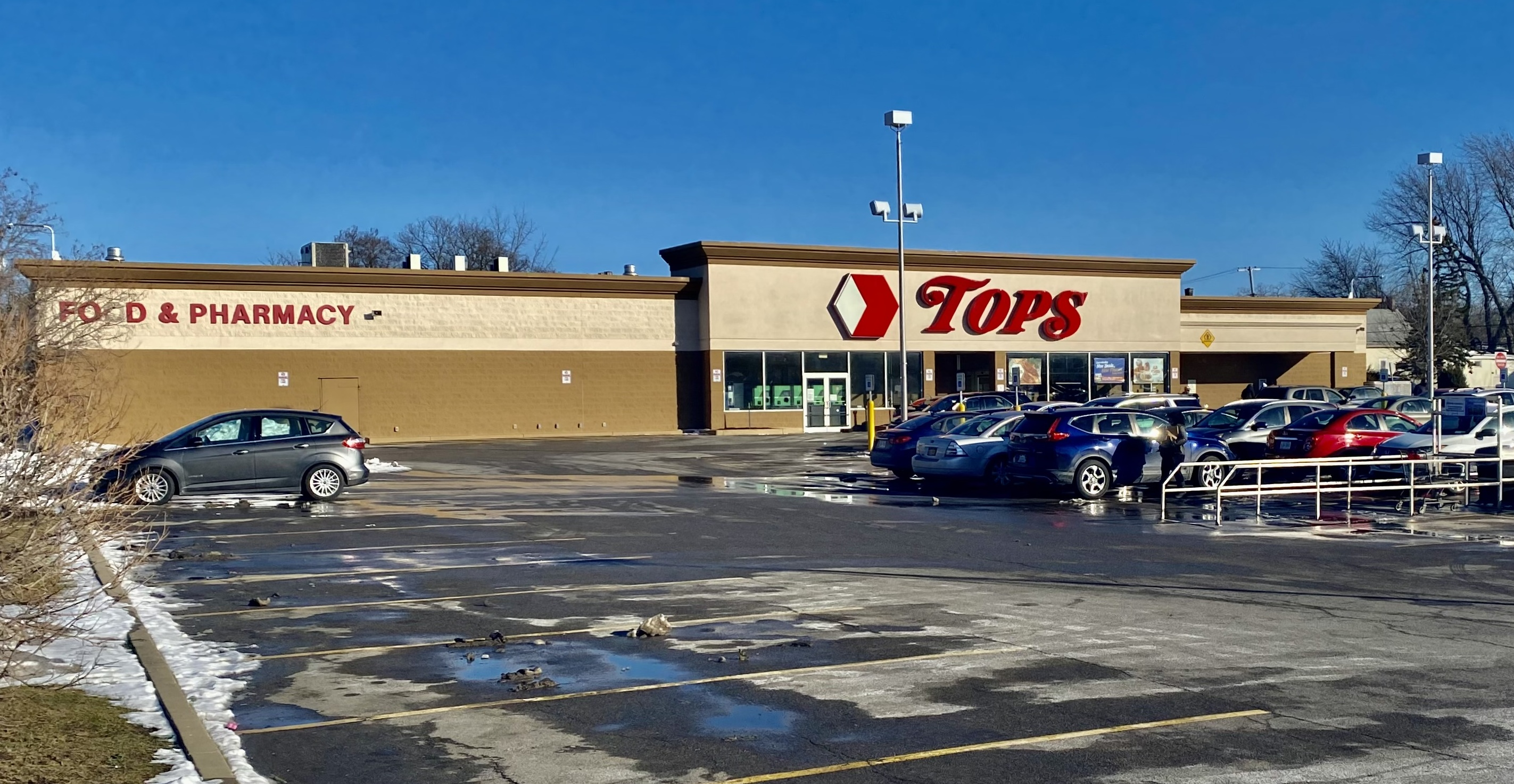
The 2022 Buffalo shooting at a Tops supermarket was said to have been inspired by the Great Replacement theory.

One day after the 2022 Buffalo shooting by Payton Gendron, avowed Christian nationalist Andrew Torba, a proponent of far-right accelerationism and the CEO of alt-tech platform Gab, posted on his own platform that "The best way to stop White genocide and White replacement, both of which are demonstrably and undeniably happening, is to get married to a White woman and have a lot of White babies". Following the mass shooting in Buffalo, U.S. Representative for New York Elise Stefanik, the third-highest ranking Republican official in the House of Representatives, faced scrutiny for past campaign ads that traffic in language similar to that used by Great Replacement conspiracy theorists. In one attack ad, she falsely accused "radical Democrats" of planning to permanently undermine elections by "grant[ing] amnesty to 11 million illegal immigrants [who] will overthrow our current electorate and create a permanent liberal majority in Washington". During the 2022 United States infant formula shortage, Stefanik accused President Biden of withholding formula from American mothers while providing it to undocumented immigrants. In response to criticism following the shooting, she refused to repudiate replacement theory, and defended using language reminiscent of QAnon conspiracy theory tropes aimed at the LGBTQ community.

=== Robert F. Kennedy Jr. COVID-19 conspiracy theory ===
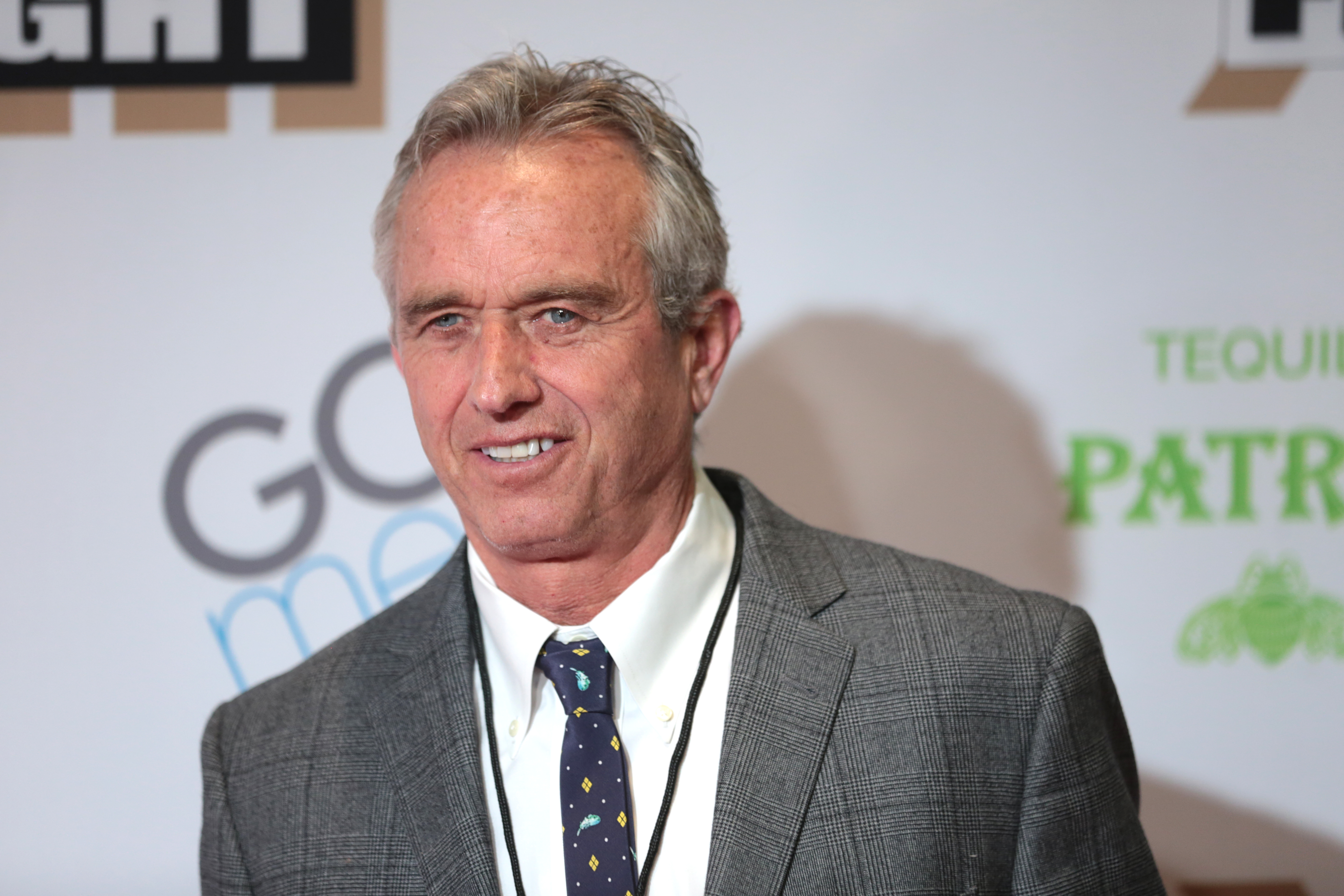
2024 U.S. presidential candidate Robert F. Kennedy Jr.'s COVID-19 immunity conspiracy theory has drawn parallels to the Great Replacement theory, in the idea that the virus was used as a "bioweapon" against white and black Americans, while "sparing" Ashkenazi Jews and Chinese people.

In July 2023, Robert F. Kennedy Jr., a candidate in the 2024 U.S. presidential election, promoted a conspiracy theory during a press event in New York City. According to a New York Post article by Jon Levine, Kennedy promoted the conspiracy that the novel coronavirus (COVID-19) was a genetically engineered bioweapon that may have been "ethnically targeted" to disproportionally affect white and black Americans, while simultaneously sparing Ashkenazi Jews and Chinese people.

During the press event, Kennedy stated:

COVID-19. There is an argument that it is ethnically targeted. COVID-19 attacks certain races disproportionately... COVID-19 is targeted to attack Caucasians and black people. The people who are most immune are Ashkenazi Jews and Chinese... We don’t know whether it was deliberately targeted or not but there are papers out there that show the racial or ethnic differential and impact.

Several news media outlets and Jewish organizations have labeled Kennedy's remarks as antisemitic, and that they promoted anti-Chinese sentiment. The Anti-Defamation League publicly responded to Kennedy's remarks, stating:

The claim that COVID-19 was a bioweapon created by the Chinese or Jews to attack Caucasians and black people is deeply offensive and feeds into sinophobic and anti-semitic conspiracy theories about COVID-19 that we have seen evolve over the last three years.

=== Republican Party ===
Since Donald Trump entered American politics as a presidential candidate in 2015, the Great Replacement conspiracy theory has become increasingly mainstream, and Republicans have embraced the conspiracy theory in various forms. Prior to this, embrace of the Great Replacement conspiracy theory was largely confined to the fringes of the party. This development represents a shift for the party, which, after the 2012 election defeat, issued a report that came to the conclusion that appealing to minorities is essential for the Republican Party to succeed in the future. Republican politicians have used the conspiracy theory to discredit the Democrats, falsely accusing them of inviting migrants to the country who would then give the Democratic Party an electoral edge.

During the 2022 Senate elections, several Republican candidates such as JD Vance campaigned using Great Replacement theory rhetoric. Other Republicans that have promoted the conspiracy theory include Matt Gaetz and Elise Stefanik.

==== 2024 Republican Party presidential debates ====
On 6 December 2023, Vivek Ramaswamy, one of four candidates participating in the fourth Republican primary debate in Tuscaloosa, touted the Great Replacement theory alongside other fringe far-right conspiracy theories. These included saying that the January 6 United States Capitol attack was "an inside job" and that the 2016 and 2020 elections were stolen from Trump by "Big Tech" and the elites. Ramaswamy claimed that the Great Replacement was not a conspiracy, but instead a "basic statement of the Democratic Party's platform". Afterwards, white supremacists such as Nick Fuentes celebrated Ramaswamy's statements.

== See also ==
- Great Replacement theory
- Christian nationalism
- Demographic threat
- Disappearing blonde gene hoax
- Eurabia conspiracy theory
- Kalergi Plan
- Love jihad conspiracy theory
- Nativism in United States politics
- Palingenetic ultranationalism
- Racial views of Donald Trump
- Racism in the United States
- Replacement migration
- The Camp of the Saints
- White nationalism
- White supremacy
- Xenophobia
