= Laura Dugan =

American criminologist and academic

- Education: Edinboro University of Pennsylvania (BFA); Carnegie Mellon University (MS, PhD)
- Known for: Co-founding the Global Terrorism Database
- Scientific career
- Fields: Criminology, Sociology
- Institutions: Ohio State University; University of Maryland; Georgia State University

Laura Dugan is an American criminologist and sociologist. She is the Ralph D. Mershon Professor of Human Security and Professor of Sociology at Ohio State University. She is one of the co-founders of the Global Terrorism Database maintained by the National Consortium for the Study of Terrorism and Responses to Terrorism based at the University of Maryland, College Park.

== Early life and education ==
Laura Dugan received a Bachelor of Fine Arts in Applied Media Arts from Edinboro University of Pennsylvania in 1987. She worked as a medical photographer at the Children's Hospital of Pittsburgh for five years. She subsequently earned a Master of Science in Public Policy and Management in 1995 and a Master of Science in Statistics in 1998 from Carnegie Mellon University. She received a PhD in Public Policy and Management from the same university in 1999. Dugan identifies as part of the LGBTQ community.

== Academic career ==
Following the completion of her doctorate, Dugan joined Georgia State University as Assistant Professor of Criminal Justice in 1999. In 2001, she joined as Assistant Professor in the Department of Criminology and Criminal Justice at the University of Maryland, College Park. She was promoted to Associate Professor in 2007 and Professor in 2014. She later served as the Director of Graduate Studies at the university.

In 2021, Dugan joined Ohio State University as Ralph D. Mershon Professor of Human Security and Professor of Sociology, and Senior Faculty Fellow at the Mershon Center for International Security Studies. In 2023, she was elected a Fellow of the American Society of Criminology.

== Global Terrorism Database ==
Dugan's early research examined violence between partners and the effectiveness of policies intended to reduce domestic violence and homicide. She subsequently focused on the study of terrorism, violence, and counter terrorism methods. Dugan was a founding co-principal investigator of Global Terrorism Database (GTD), an open-source database documenting terrorist incidents worldwide since 1970, that is maintained by the National Consortium for the Study of Terrorism and Responses to Terrorism based at the University of Maryland. The GTD was formally introduced in a 2007 paper by Dugan and Gary LaFree in the journal Terrorism and Political Violence. She was also a principal investigator of the Government Actions in Terrorist Environments (GATE) project, which records government responses to terrorist organisations from 1987.

== Works and publications ==
Dugan has authored numerous articles and publications on terrorism. Her work has been published in peer-reviewed journals such as Journal of Quantitative Criminology, Criminology, American Sociological Review, Law & Society Review, Terrorism and Political Violence, and Journal of Peace Research. She co-authored the book Putting Terrorism into Context: Lessons Learned from the World's Most Comprehensive Terrorism Database. She was one of the editors of the Criminology and The Causes, Conduct, and Consequences of Terrorism book series published by Oxford University Press.
