= 1991 Lolotique U.S. Army helicopter shootdown =

1991 incident in the Salvadoran Civil War

Coordinates: 13.556°N 88.349°W

On January 2, 1991, a U.S. Army helicopter carrying three American soldiers was shot down by the Farabundo Martí National Liberation Front (FMLN) nearby the village of Lolotique, San Miguel Department, El Salvador. The two surviving soldiers were summarily executed by FMLN forces in one of the most infamous incidents during El Salvador's civil war.

The incident occurred during the 1979–1992 Salvadoran Civil War, pitted between government forces and left-wing guerillas. Mass killings of civilians, especially by the military, were widespread during the conflict.

Around 2:15 p.m., a Bell UH-1 Iroquois making its way to Honduras was shot down by the FMLN using small arms fire. Pilot Chief Warrant Officer Four Daniel Scott was killed in the crash on the controls, but two other servicemen, Lieutenant Colonel David Pickett (copilot) and Specialist Earnest Dawson (the crew chief), managed to survive.

FMLN militants stole all the equipment from the helicopter and ordered locals to relocate the officers as the aircraft would be set on fire. A farmer told that the United Press International that he had left for an hour to get water for the survivors but they were already dead by time he came back.

An autopsy by an American forensic team, led by U.S. Navy Capt. (Dr.) Glenn N. Wagner, found that Pickett and Dawson had been murdered by the guerillas, each with gunshot wounds in the head. Wagner confirmed that Scott died in the crash from injuries consistent with a pilot on the controls of an aircraft and stated Scott had no gunshot wounds. Pickett was alive at the time and seemed to have been raising his left arm to defend himself when he was shot.

The FMLN's initial stance was that it had shot down the helicopter without knowing it was American, and that Dawson and Pickett had died of their injuries later on. The FMLN later changed the narrative to one where the two soldiers were killed in a fight with guerillas.

On January 18 the FMLN put two guerrillas on trial for the incident. The Salvadoran government criticized the group for not letting the trial happen at a government tribunal.

Human Rights Watch and the Truth Commission for El Salvador both identified the FMLN as the perpetrator. Human Rights Watch said that of all FMLN war crimes during the conflicts, there was "perhaps none so infamous as the January 2 execution of two injured U.S. servicemen after their helicopter was shot down over eastern El Salvador." Edward Mickolus described the shootdown as a terrorist incident in 1997.

In 1992, after the war had ended, former rebels Severiano Fuentes and Fernan Fernandez turned themselves in and admitted responsibility for the killings. An amnesty law in 1993 pardoned all fighters in the conflict from being prosecuted for war crimes, setting them free. The law was eventually reversed and in 2020, ex-guerrilla Santos Guevara was arrested by Salvadoran police for his role in the shootdown.

== See also ==
- 1980 murders of U.S. missionaries in El Salvador
- 1985 Zona Rosa attacks
