= International Terrorism: Attributes of Terrorist Events =

Terrorism database

The International Terrorism: Attributes of Terrorist Events project, commonly known as ITERATE, records data regarding transnational terrorist groups and their activities. It is one of the most comprehensive databases of its type; most academic research in the field stems from either ITERATE or the Global Terrorism Database. Published by Vinyard Software, it is available as a qualitative textual chronology from 1960–present and a quantitative numerically coded database from 1968–present.

== Data ==
The quantitative data set contains one main file and three complementary files. The main file ("Common File") is the most extensive, recording 42 different variables such as location, type of attack, perpetrator(s), and casualties. The "Fate File" records 14 variables relating to the fate of the terrorist group(s) involved where at least one failed to escape. The "Hostage File" records 41 variables specific to events involving hostage-taking. The "Skyjack File" records 27 variables specific to instances of skyjacking. The files are designed to be used together with almost all incidents recorded in the Common File and supplementary variables recorded where appropriate.

The qualitative file provides a textual account of each incident. All files in both qualitative and quantitative data sets utilize the same incident codes for cross-referencing.

Each data set is updated daily.

ITERATE predominately utilises open-source data collection such as academic research and media articles. It also uses intelligence from government agencies as well as interviews with academics, government officials, and victims

== History ==
ITERATE was originally created by CIA analyst Dr Edward Mickolus who co-founded Vinyard Software, ITERATE's publisher, with Dr Calvin Andrus.

== Strengths and Limitations ==
=== Definition of terrorism ===
The definition of terrorism used by ITERATE differs to that used by other databases. This is not unique to ITERATE as all 5 of the most prominent terrorism databases utilize their own definition. ITERATE defines terrorism as:

"...the use, or threat of use, of anxiety-inducing, extra-normal violence for political purposes by any individual or group, whether acting for or in opposition to established governmental authority, when such action is intended to influence the attitudes and behavior of a target group wider than the immediate victims and when, through the nationality or foreign ties of its perpetrators, its location, the nature of its institutional or human victims, or the mechanics of its resolution, its ramifications transcend national boundaries."

ITERATE does not record instances of domestic terrorism, focusing exclusively on international/transnational terrorism, thus excluding the majority of terrorist incidents. It differentiates between these as follows.

"International terrorism is such action when carried out by individuals or groups controlled by a sovereign state, whereas transnational terrorism is carried out by basically autonomous non-state actors, whether or not they enjoy some degree of support from sympathetic states."

That said, the same definition of terrorism has been use throughout the ITERATE project avoiding inconsistencies in data recording, unlike several other databases.

=== Open-source data collection ===
The use of open-source data collection methods has both pros and cons:

- Unlike criminals, terrorists rely on publicity for success meaning that terror events are highly likely to be recorded in the media.
- Low profile or unsuccessful terror attacks are less likely to be reported by media, creating a bias towards more newsworthy attacks.
- The data may have a Western bias due to under-reporting of attacks in foreign regions as a result of language barriers and lack of press freedom in certain countries.

== Data on Terrorist Subjects (DOTS) Database ==
The Data on Terrorist Subjects (DOTS) Database was later introduced to supplement ITERATE. It contains biographical information on every terrorist and person of interest included in ITERATE.
