= MIPT =

MIPT can refer to:

- Moscow Institute of Physics and Technology
- National Memorial Institute for the Prevention of Terrorism
- MiPT, N-Methyl-N-isopropyltryptamine
- Male Iron Pipe Thread, see Gender of connectors and fasteners
