= Worldwide Incidents Tracking System =

The Worldwide Incidents Tracking System (WITS) was the US government's database on tracking acts of terrorism. It contained details about incidents of violence against civilians and non-combatants (including military personnel and assets outside of war-like settings) from publicly viewable information.

The National Counterterrorism Center (NCTC) discontinued WITS in 2012 and was merged into the Global Terrorism Database (GTD), which can be downloaded from the National Consortium for the Study of Terrorism and Responses to Terrorism (START) website at the University of Maryland.

== Data collection ==
When collecting data WITS addressed two areas of concern: it practiced basic knowledge management techniques to ensure consistency in data collection and it cast a wider net on political violence than what may be considered terrorism. Casting a wider net ensured all candidate events are given fair consideration. Data was collected in a variety of ways. The NCTC gathered data from open sources manually using commercial subscription news services, the USG's Open Source Center (OSC), local news websites reported in English, and, as permitted by the linguistic capabilities of the team, local news websites reported in foreign languages. Team members on the NCTC read and reviewed each article. A senior intelligence analyst provided quality control over his or her team. The senior analyst reviewed each article to maintain consistency before publishing to the database.

To reduce interpretation bias further (or increase inter-rater reliability), NCTC has analysts maintained account notes of commonly used terms and phrases found in the press, recurring political and ethnic issues, terrain notes, weather related trends, and other factors that influence a mastery of context surrounding acts of violence in countries assigned to their area of responsibility.

To ensure WITS would give fair and proper consideration to all the events available in open source, WITS collected information on attacks that have any indications of terrorism.

== Humans and computers ==
NCTC designed the WITS data coding process to make the best use of humans and computers. There is evidence to suggest that statistical models based on expert human judgment in older cases tend to outperform the same expert human judgment in newer cases. John Wiggle says, "Studies show that humans are good at categorizing and recognizing discrete objects and concepts, but often lack the ability to make effective aggregate judgments." Being able to use humans and computers allows analysts to separate data quickly and effectively to determine what is or is not an act of violence. Analysts can then code them into the database, and the WITS system then made a logical decision on whether the act meets the criteria for terrorism. Having the computer assist NCTC with what is or is not terrorism allowed an analyst to compare the computer’s answer with human thinking about the attack.

== Content ==
As of September 2010, WITS contained over 68,939 records.

The database was organized in the following dimensions:

- City
- Country
- Damage
- Event Type
- Facilities Type
- Geocode Anchor
- Geocode Country
- Geocode Province
- Group Type
- ICN: An incident number of form YYYYMMDDXX
- Incident Group Type
- Incident Subject
- Incident Summary
- Incident Year
- Included Facility Defining Characteristics
- Included Facility Nationalities
- Included Facility Targeted Characteristics
- Included Group Nationalities
- Perpetrator Confidence
- Provinces States
- Related Term
- Victim Incident Country
- WITS Child Record ParentID
- Weapon
