= Chicago Project on Security and Threats =

Research institute based at the University of Chicago

Coordinates: 41.78894°N 87.59825°W

The Chicago Project on Security and Threats (CPOST) describes itself as an "international security affairs research institute based at the University of Chicago." Formerly known as the Chicago Project on Security and Terrorism, and the Chicago Project on Suicide Terrorism, it was founded in 2004 by Robert Pape, professor of political science at the University of Chicago and author of Dying to Win, a book about suicide terrorism. It compiles, maintains and publishes the Database on Suicide Attacks, a comprehensive dataset of suicide terrorism around the world that covers attacks from 1974 to 2019. CPOST frequently works closely with the United States government, particularly the Department of Defense.

== Media coverage ==
The work of CPOST has been covered in The New York Times, The Washington Post, The Boston Globe, Foreign Policy, and ABC News.

CPOST members have appeared on C-SPAN shows discussing terrorism as well as on CNN. CPOST recently released its first report titled "The American Face of ISIS" in partnership with the Australian Strategic Policy Institute.

The Chicago Project on Security and Threats (CPOST) has contributed to the analysis and development of security policies for places of worship. In 2024, the federal government announced a $400 million increase in funding to enhance security at these locations. This initiative supports non-profit organizations, including religious institutions, in implementing vital security measures to protect against various threats.

== CPOST and GTD ==
Pape et al. reported major differences in the numbers of suicide terrorist incidents by year between CPOST and the Global Terrorism Database (GTD). For 2008 and 2013 they reported the following:

Pape's comparison of GTD and CPOST
	GTD	CPOST
2007	359	521
2013	619	423
% change	72%	-19%

Pape et al. quote GTD officials as claiming that their “researchers, past and present, have ensured that the entire database uses the same standards for inclusion and is as comprehensive as possible.” Pape et al. disagree, noting that the difference between the GTD and CPOST counts is easily explained by a change in GTD methodology that occurred 11/1/2011. Meanwhile, they claim their CPOST methodology has been consistent since their first recorded incident in 1982. They conclude, “American policy makers and the public deserve the best data available on terrorism, one of the most important national security issues of our time.”
