= National Memorial Institute for the Prevention of Terrorism =

Oklahoma-based non-profit research organization

Memorial Institute for the Prevention of Terrorism (MIPT)
- Founded: April 19, 2000
- Location: 621 N. Robinson Avenue, Suite 400, Oklahoma City, Oklahoma 73102
- Coordinates: 35.4732°N 97.5168°W
- Key people: David Edger, Chairman; David Cid, Executive Director

The Memorial Institute for the Prevention of Terrorism (MIPT) was a non-profit organization founded in response to the 1995 Oklahoma City bombing. Supported by Department of Homeland Security and other government grant funds, it conducted research into the causes of terrorism and maintained the MIPT Terrorism Knowledge Base — which was an online database of terrorist incidents, groups, and other information. MIPT also worked in conjunction with RAND, for some of its research and analysis. The institute provided training and professional development dedicated to improving the skills of law enforcement officers.

== Role and focus ==
MIPT provided training to the 800,000 uniformed officers of US domestic police forces through its training model, Information Collection on Patrol (InCOP). InCOP was a series of workshops that enhanced departmental intelligence capacity, both in traditional crime and terrorism prevention, by progressively improving the collection skills of the line officer, improving the quality, quantity and timeliness of reporting.

InCOP course offerings included InCOP 1 which highlighted the importance of the line officers role in the Nationwide Suspicious Activity Reporting Initiative. This offering included the Hypervigilance Process, a way of scanning the patrol environment as well as The 2-Minute Interview technique. In InCOP 2, participants learned the importance of cultivating community contacts. InCOP 3 began an open facilitated dialogue between officers and crime analysts, while InCOP 4 taught the evolution and changes of the terrorism threat, the current terrorist threat, terrorist tactics and operations and how to develop warnings and indicators as well as detect them.

== History ==
MIPT was founded by the survivors and family members of the Oklahoma City bombing in 1995. It was their intention to establish an institute dedicated to terrorism prevention. The first Board of Directors was appointed in 2000 by then Oklahoma Governor Frank Keating. The institute soon began operations conducting research and funding a wide array of projects, both hard and soft science, developing advanced tools such as explosive detection devices, and new work on the biology of anthrax.

In 2004, MIPT conceptualized, developed and launched three knowledge bases: Lessons Learned Information Sharing, the Responder Knowledge Base and the Terrorism Knowledge Base.

In 2007, MIPT became a national training center. MIPT's training model and content is recognized by both the United States Department of Justice and the Department of Homeland Security as a part of the National Suspicious Activity Reporting Initiative.

In August 2014, MIPT closed after losing federal funding.

== MIPT's Lawson Library ==
MIPT's Lawson Library built a collection of online law enforcement resources and as of 2013 housed the largest collection of terrorism and homeland security related resources outside the Library of Congress.

=== Physical artifacts ===
MIPT housed the Terrorism Memorial Flag. The flag is 63 feet (19m) long, 35 feet (11m) tall and contains the names of over 4,000 U.S. citizens who were victims of terrorism since 1970. The flag, and its accompanying database were housed on the MIPT website.

== MIPT achievements ==
Incorporated in 2000 with funding through the National Institute of Justice's Office of Science and Technology, early research focused primarily on technical and applied projects including: detectors for explosives and chemical and biological weapons; personal protective equipment; forensics; and critical infrastructure protection to name a few.

MIPT developed and provided oversight for three knowledge bases: Lessons Learned Information Sharing (LLIS), the Responder Knowledge Base (RKB) and the Terrorism Knowledge Base (TKB).

== Parent agencies and partners ==
MIPT was supported by the Department of Homeland Security (DHS) through a cooperative agreement with the Federal Emergency Management Association National Preparedness Directorate, Training Division.

== Closure of MIPT ==
In August 2014, MIPT closed after losing federal funding. The MIPT and TKB websites were shut down and the database is currently not accessible to the public.
