= National Consortium for the Study of Terrorism and Responses to Terrorism =

Homeland Security Center of Excellence at the University of Maryland, College Park

The National Consortium for the Study of Terrorism and Responses to Terrorism (START) is an emeritus Homeland Security Centers of Excellence at the University of Maryland, College Park that researches terrorism in the United States and around the world. It maintains the Global Terrorism Database, which includes over 200,000 terrorist attacks and which it describes as the "most comprehensive unclassified data base on terrorist events in the world."

== Activities ==
=== Teaching ===
START has several education programs for undergraduate and graduate students, including a paid internship program, online courses, a minor in Global Terrorism Studies, a Graduate Certificate in Terrorism Analysis, and a Master of Professional Studies (MPS) in Security and Terrorism Studies.

=== Data ===
START offers a number of datasets related to terrorism. The most important of these is the Global Terrorism Database, a database of over 200,000 terrorist attacks from 1970 till 2019, excluding the year 1993 (as of July 2016). The GTD is the most comprehensive unclassified database on terrorist attacks in the world, containing information on over 200,000 terrorist attacks, including 95,000 bombings, 20,000 assassinations, and 15,000 kidnappings and hostage events. Over 4 million news articles were reviewed to collect the data to build the GTD.

START also hosts the MIPT Terrorism Knowledge Base, now known as the Terrorist Organization Profiles, but does not actively maintain or take responsibility for the data.

== Major projects ==
=== Social Media Use during disasters ===
Social Media Use during Disasters is a research project that was conducted from July 2012 to October 2013, and it is one of the major contributions by the START research center to the risk communication field. Sites such as Facebook and Twitter are used to collect and distribute information quickly and easily. Because of this function of social media, it is being used as a tool to communicate about disasters. "Given the growing importance of social media as a disaster communication tool, it is vital to understand how individuals use, behave, and interpret information on social media sites to better inform policy, guidance, and operations and to ensure that emergency managers, first responders, and policy makers can best optimize how they use these tools."

A random sample of 2,015 U.S. residents participated in this study. The participants were asked to imagine that a disaster involving multiple terrorist attacks was unfolding. The participants were then presented with information from both local and national sources about the disaster through Facebook posts and tweets. Participants were then asked to complete a questionnaire assessing their responses to the information.

The study found that the source of the information impacted its perceived credibility. However, the source alone did not influence participants’ likelihood of taking recommended action. The study also showed that after participants were exposed to the information they were more likely to communicate that information through interpersonal channels rather than through organizational media channels. Finally, the study also showed that demographics such as gender and age affected how participants responded to the information.

=== Training in risk and crisis communication ===
Training in Risk and Crisis Communication (TRACC) is another major contribution by START to the risk communication field. TRACC is a curriculum presented by the START research center for the benefit of organizations. TRACC is separated into 3 modules that aim to train organizations on how to properly communicate crisis information before, during, and after the crisis situation. "TRACC is a unique curriculum that is research-based and covers the entire life-cycle of a crisis including preparation, response and recovery."

=== Organizational dimensions of risk communication during homeland security crises ===
The START research center also completed a project titled Organizational Dimensions of Risk Communication during Homeland Security Crises. This project focuses on risk communication at the organizational level by "exploring how communications within and among organizations affect risk management and risk communication about bioterrorism." This project aims to improve communication about bioterrorism between organizations and their public. For this study, researchers focused on the anthrax attacks of 2001. The researchers conducted over 50 interviews with local people who were in positions with agency such as law enforcement officers, elected officials, and health professionals. Researchers asked the participants to describe how decisions were made in their organizations and how information was communicated from their organizations. Forms of written communication such as electronic correspondence and reports were also analyzed.

This study produced 5 major findings. The first is "Organizations faced both technical and social uncertainties." These uncertainties included that the authorities in the situation were unclear, and these uncertainties negatively affected risk communication. The second major finding of this study is "Organizational networks were essential for risk communication to the public and workers." This means that successful risk communication depends on how effective the communication process is between agencies. The third major finding is "Relationships among local professional first responders and public health agencies were often constructive." Informal methods of communication between law enforcement officers and health professionals help facilitate communication to the public. The fourth major finding is, "Communication problems resulted from lack of communication triage." This means that organizations did not prioritize their many audiences or their channels for reaching those audiences. The fifth and final major finding is, "The concept of elite panic needs further conceptualizing and research." Researchers noticed the concept of elite panic during the interview analysis process. Elite panic is the idea that the unfounded fears felt by the social and financial elite, such as the fear that working-class people will commit violent crimes during a disaster rather than helping their neighbors, drives some responses to disasters. This concept needs to be better understood to improve crisis communication.

=== Profiles of Individual Radicalization in the United States (PIRUS) ===
The Profiles of Individual Radicalization in the United States (PIRUS) dataset contains information about more than 2,200 violent and non-violent extremists who hold far right, far left, Islamist, or single issue ideologies in the United States, from 1948-2018.

== Media coverage ==
The work at START has been cited and quoted in the Huffington Post, the New York Times, The Guardian, and the Wall Street Journal.
