= Institute for the Study of Violent Groups =

American research institute

The Institute for the Study of Violent Groups (ISVG) is a research institute focused on insurgency, terrorism, and transnational organized crime located at the University of New Haven in West Haven, Connecticut.

The organization's main mission is to aggregate, code, and analyze data. The organization claims to have built the largest and most comprehensive open-source database on violent extremism and transnational threats, which can be accessed via the DAVE Data Access and Visualization Environment (D.A.V.E. ISVG provides this open-source data and analysis to federal, state, and local law enforcement agencies in support of counter-terrorism.

== History ==
ISVG was established in 2002 at Sam Houston State University in Texas by Dr. Richard Ward, then dean of the College of Criminal Justice, through a grant from the Bureau of Justice Assistance at the United States Department of Justice. ISVG was originally created to test the feasibility of using a relational database to identify trends, relationships, and tactics of terrorist groups using only open source information.

In 2008, Ward moved ISVG to the University of New Haven and began distributing its data collection efforts. In 2011, the ISVG launched its Violent Extremism Knowledge Base (VKB). The same year, it announced the Homeland Security Open Source Solution (HSOSS) with i2 Group, Inc.

The original staff consisted of seven data collectors. Currently, ISVG has more than 90 personnel involved in collecting and analyzing open source information.
