= Edward Mickolus =

Edward Francis Mickolus, Jr.
- Born: December 28, 1950 (age 75)
- Citizenship: USA
- Education: Georgetown University; Yale University
- Occupation: counter-terrorism analysts
- Spouse(s): Susan Schjelderup (m. January 15, 1983.)
- Writing career
- Genre: counter-terrorism

Edward Francis Mickolus, Jr. (born December 28, 1950) is an author and counter-terrorism expert, and formerly an officer in the Central Intelligence Agency, from which he retired in 2008. Mickolus is the author or co-author of a number of books on counter-terrorism.

== Personal life ==
Born to Catherine Teresa (née Lawlor; 1916–1995) and Edward Francis Mickolus (1911–1996), he is of Irish and Lithuanian ethnic descent, and he was raised and is a practicing Catholic.

Mickolus married Susan Schjelderup, daughter of Maria (née Giuliano; 1922–2006) and John Rost Schjelderup (1917–2005), on January 15, 1983.

He is an avid collector of neckties with around 1700 of them.
