= Robert Pape =

American political scientist (born 1960)

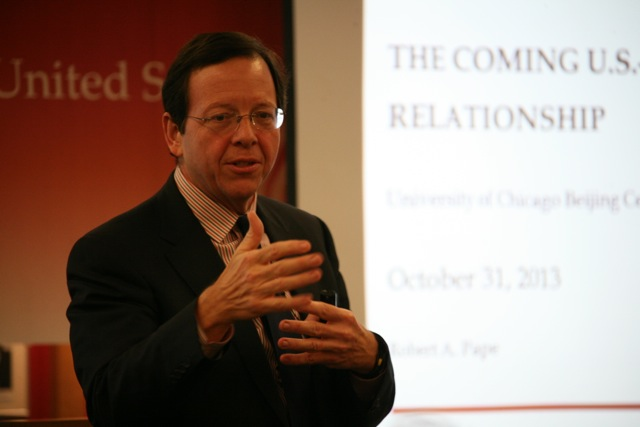
- Pape in 2013
- Born: Robert Anthony Pape; April 24, 1960 (age 66)
- Education: University of Pittsburgh (BA, MA); University of Chicago (PhD)
- Occupations: Political scientist; professor; author
- Notable credit(s): Bombing to Win, Dying to Win, Cutting the Fuse, with James K. Feldman
- Website: Page at the University of Chicago

Robert Anthony Pape ([peɪp]; born April 24, 1960) is an American political scientist who studies national and international security affairs, with a focus on air power, political violence, social media propaganda, and terrorism. He is a professor of political science at the University of Chicago and the founder and director of the Chicago Project on Security and Threats (CPOST).

== Career ==
Pape graduated with a bachelor's degree in political science from the University of Pittsburgh in 1982 as a Harry S. Truman Scholar. He earned his Ph.D. from the University of Chicago in 1988 in the same field. He taught international relations at Dartmouth College from 1994 to 1999 and at the United States Air Force's School of Advanced Airpower Studies from 1991 to 1994. Since 1999, he has taught at the University of Chicago, where he is now tenured.

Pape has been the director of the graduate studies department of political science as well as the chair of the Committee on International Relations at the University of Chicago. During the 2008 presidential campaign, Pape served as an advisor to Democratic Party Senator and later president, Barack Obama. During the same campaign cycle, he was also briefly an advisor on Iraq to Republican Congressman Ron Paul.

=== CPOST ===
After presenting preliminary data on his research into suicide terrorism in the American Political Science Review in 2003, Pape founded the Chicago Project on Security and Threats (originally, Chicago Project on Suicide Terrorism), which he directs. The project is funded by the Carnegie Corporation, the Pentagon's Defense Threat Reduction Agency, the University of Chicago, and the Argonne National Laboratory. In December 2009, Security Studies published an issue on terrorism featuring content exclusively from CPOST.

== Research ==
=== Bombing to Win ===
Pape published his first full-length book in 1996, Bombing to Win: Air Power and Coercion in War, which assesses the efficacy of different airpower strategies. It questions the conventional wisdom that coercive air power (i.e. bombing, etc.) is both effective and relatively cheap. Rather than motivating citizens of a bombed nation to rise up against their government, coercive air power often backfires, resulting in a citizenry that is more resilient and loyal. Pape also argues that air power and land power should be integrated and used together in a "hammer and anvil" fashion.

A 1999 RAND Corporation report funded by the U.S. Air Force (USAF) "explored the role of air power as a coercive instrument", contesting Pape's argument. They concluded that, "Although the United States and the USAF have scored some notable successes, the record is mixed." Horowitz and Reiter applied "multivariate probit analysis [to] all instances of air power coercion from 1917 to 1999", and which matched Pape's qualitative assessment that attacking military targets has improved the chances of success, but "higher levels of civilian vulnerability have no effect on the chances of coercion success".

=== Economic sanctions ===
In 1997 and 1998, Pape published two articles examining the efficacy of economic sanctions. Pape contests the validity of international economic sanctions in achieving policy goals, judging that only 5% can legitimately be considered successes, as opposed to 34% claimed in the work of other scholars. One of these scholars, Kimberly Ann Elliot, responded to Pape's initial piece, suggesting that Pape had mischaracterized the data, and that his views on economic sanctions and Elliot's views on economic sanctions were "not terribly different." Pape's response, in the same issue of 'International Security', insisted that he had not mischaracterized the data, and that his view of economic sanctions is meaningfully different from the picture put forth by Elliot and others. Pape also published several articles analyzing the Arab Spring in 2013.

=== Terrorism ===
Pape's Dying to Win: The Strategic Logic of Suicide Terrorism (2005) challenges claims that suicide terrorism is irrational. Pape argues instead that there is a strategic logic to suicide terrorism: suicide terrorism is an effective way to attain significant concessions from modern liberal democracies on issues that are not a vital interest to those democracies. Pape argues that there is "little connection between suicide terrorism and Islamic fundamentalism, or any one of the world's religions... Rather, what nearly all suicide terrorist attacks have in common is a specific secular and strategic goal: to compel modern democracies to withdraw military forces from territory that the terrorists consider to be their homeland". Pape also presents evidence that the majority of suicide terrorists do not come from impoverished or uneducated backgrounds, but rather have middle class origins and a significant level of education.

In a criticism of Pape's link between occupation and suicide terrorism, Scott Ashworth and coauthors from Princeton charged Pape with "sampling on the dependent variable" by limiting research only to cases in which suicide terror was used. Similar criticisms were made by Michael C. Horowitz, who concludes the presence of an occupying power is not a statistically significant indicator of likelihood to incite suicide terrorism. In response, Pape argues that his research design is sufficient because it collected the universe of known cases of suicide terrorism. In a rejoinder, Ashworth et al. discuss how even large samples of the dependent variable cannot be used to explain variation in outcomes, why suicide terrorism in some places but not others, if the sample does not vary. Assaf Moghadam has also criticized Pape's conclusions.

Pape's Cutting the Fuse: The Explosion of Global Suicide Terrorism and How to Stop It is co-authored with James K. Feldman, was published in 2010. Cutting the Fuse evaluates more than 2100 suicide attacks (6 times the number evaluated in Dying to Win) in an attempt to identify key factors that explain the ebb and flow of suicide terrorist campaigns. The book recommends that nations avoid stationing troops where they will be perceived as occupiers threatening local culture and institutions or coercing the government of an occupied state to do things that would be perceived as benefiting the occupiers at the expense of the local population. When occupation is necessary, minimize the threat to local culture by helping local officials to do things they might otherwise want to do but didn't previously have the ability and by treating collateral damage with great sensitivity. Pape also edited the special issue, “What’s New about Research on Terrorism,” Security Studies (18.4), a leading peer-reviewed journal in international relations.

In 2015, Pape and neuroscientist Jean Decety received a $3.4 million grant from the Department of Defense's Minerva Research Initiative to study the social and neurological construction of martyrdom. In May 2019, Pape participated in the Christchurch Call, a plan launched by Prime Minister of New Zealand Jacinda Ardern and French President Emmanuel Macron to end the promotion of extremist content online. Pape also presented his research on ISIS propaganda videos to organizations such as the FBI, BOP, SSCI, NCTC, NSC, and SOCOM. In February 2020, Pape and CPOST received a $1.5 million grant to study Arabic-language propaganda.

=== Political violence internationally and in the United States ===
Pape began studying the causes and viable solutions to political violence in the 1990s, focusing on the 1992-1995 Bosnian War and the 1999 War in Kosovo. His work on suicide terrorism (2003, 2005, 2010) explained that it is mainly a form of political violence, while his work on humanitarian intervention (2012) centered on appropriate international responses to political violence related to the Arab Spring in Libya and Syria. In 2017, Pape published an analysis of political violence in Iraq, Afghanistan, Pakistan. In January 2018, Pape testified before the House Subcommittee on National Security on the military defeat of ISIS.

In August 2019, Pape briefed the National Security Council on an "over-the-horizon" counter-terrorism strategy to end the War in Afghanistan. In November 2019, Pape and the UN Counter-Terrorism Executive Directorate (CTED) co-hosted a colloquium at the University of Chicago discussing ways to improve responses to future terrorist attacks and advance academic research on the impact of militant political violence and terrorism.

Since 2020, Pape has focused increasingly on American political violence while maintaining his research on international terrorism. In 2020, Pape published the results of his analysis of the impact of the deployment of US Department of Homeland Security agents on political violence in Portland and conducted research studies of the demographic profile of right wing extremists in the US from 2015-2020. In 2021, Pape published the first systematic study of the demographic profile and political geography of individuals arrested for assaulting the US Capitol on January 6, 2021, which received significant attention in the media in the U.S. and internationally.

His 2020s research includes: "Understanding Campus Fears After October 7 and How to Reduce Them" (CPOST Research Report, March 2024); "The Political Geography of the January 6 Insurrectionists," with Kyle Larson and Keven Ruby, PS: Political Science and Politics (April 2024); “Hamas is Winning: Why Israel’s Failing Strategy Makes the Enemy Stronger,” Foreign Affairs (June 21, 2024): “Understanding the Impact of Military Service on Support for Political Violence,” with Keven Ruby, Kyle Larson, and Kentaro Nakamura, Journal of Conflict Resolution (August 2024).

== Selected publications ==
=== Books ===
- Bombing to Win: Air Power and Coercion in War. Cornell University Press, 1996. ISBN 0-8014-3134-4 (hardcover). ISBN 0-8014-8311-5 (paperback). Debated in Security Studies 7.2 (Winter 1997/98) p. 93-214 and 7.3 (Spring 1998) p. 182-228.
- Dying to Win: The Strategic Logic of Suicide Terrorism. New York: Random House, 2005. ISBN 1-4000-6317-5 (hardcover). London: Gibson Square 2006 (updated). ISBN 1-903933-78-1 (hardcover).
- with James K. Feldman, Cutting the Fuse: The Explosion of Global Suicide Terrorism and How to Stop It. University of Chicago Press, 2010. ISBN 978-0-226-64560-5
- Our Own Worst Enemies: America in the Age of Violent Populism The New Press, 2026. (forthcoming)

=== Academic articles ===
- “Coercive Air Power in the Vietnam War,” International Security, 15.2 (Fall 1990).
- "Why Economic Sanctions Do Not Work," International Security 22.2 (Fall 1997).
- "The Strategic Logic of Suicide Terrorism," American Political Science Review 97.3 (August 2003).
- The True Worth of Air Power,” Foreign Affairs 83.2 (March/April, 2004).
- "Empire Falls" The National Interest (Jan/Feb 2009)
- “Reconsidering the Cases of Humanitarian Intervention,” International Security 38.2 (Fall 2013).
- “Solving the Problem of Missing Perpetrator Information,” Journal of Conflict Resolution with Vincent Bauer and Keven Ruby (2015).
- "The American face of ISIS: Analysis of ISIS–related terrorism in the US March 2014–August 2016" Australian Strategic Policy Institute (2017).
- "Days of Action or Restraint? How the Islamic Calendar Impacts Violence," American Political Science Review 111.3 (2017).
- "A Multilevel Social Neuroscience Perspective on Radicalization and Terrorism," Social Neuroscience 13.5 (2018).
- "EEG Distinguishes Heroic Narratives in ISIS Online Video Propaganda," Scientific Reports 10, 19593 (2020).
- "Introducing the new CPOST dataset on suicide attacks", Journal of Peace Research, forthcoming (2021).
- “Bombing to Lose: Why Air Power Can’t Salvage Russia’s Doomed War in Ukraine,” Foreign Affairs (October 2022)
- “A Slow-Rolling Disaster: Assessing the Impact of the Covid-19 Pandemic on Militant Violence,” with Christopher Price, Journal of Conflict Resolution (June 2023)
- “Israel’s Failed Bombing Campaign in Gaza,” Foreign Affairs (December 2023)
- “Understanding Campus Fears After October 7 and How to Reduce Them” (CPOST Research Report, March 2024)
- "The Political Geography of the January 6 Insurrectionists," with Kyle Larson and Keven Ruby, PS: Political Science and Politics (April 2024)
- “Hamas is Winning: Why Israel’s Failing Strategy Makes the Enemy Stronger,” Foreign Affairs (June 21, 2024)
- “Understanding the Impact of Military Service on Support for Political Violence,” with Keven Ruby, Kyle Larson, and Kentaro Nakamura, Journal of Conflict Resolution (August 2024)
