= Gender Development Index =

Index designed to measure gender equality

The Gender Development Index (GDI) is an index designed to measure gender equality.

GDI, together with the Gender Empowerment Measure (GEM), was introduced in 1995 in the Human Development Report written by the United Nations Development Program. These measurements aimed to add a gender-sensitive dimension to the Human Development Index (HDI). The first measurement that they created was the Gender Development Index (GDI). The GDI is defined as a "distribution-sensitive measure that accounts for the human development impact of existing gender gaps in the three components of the HDI" (Klasen 243). Distribution sensitivity means that the GDI takes into account not only the average or general level of well-being and wealth within a given country but focuses also on how this wealth and well-being is distributed between different groups within society. The HDI and the GDI (as well as the GEM) were created to rival the more traditional general income-based measures of development such as gross domestic product (GDP) and gross national product (GNP).

== Definition and calculation ==
The GDI is often considered a "gender-sensitive extension of the HDI" (Klasen 245). It addresses gender gaps in life expectancy, education, and income. It uses an "inequality aversion" penalty, which creates a development score penalty for gender wander gaps in any of the categories of the Human Development Index (HDI) which include life expectancy, adult literacy, school enrolment, and logarithmic transformations of per-capita income. In terms of life expectancy, the GDI assumes that women will live an average of five years longer than men. Additionally, in terms of income, the GDI considers income gaps in terms of actual earned income.

== Gender Development Index (2018) ==
Below is a list of countries by their Gender Development Index, based on data collected in 2018, and published in 2019. Countries are grouped into five groups based on the absolute deviation from gender parity in HDI values, from 1 (closest to gender parity) to 5 (furthest from gender parity). This means that grouping takes equally into consideration gender gaps favouring males, as well as those favouring females.

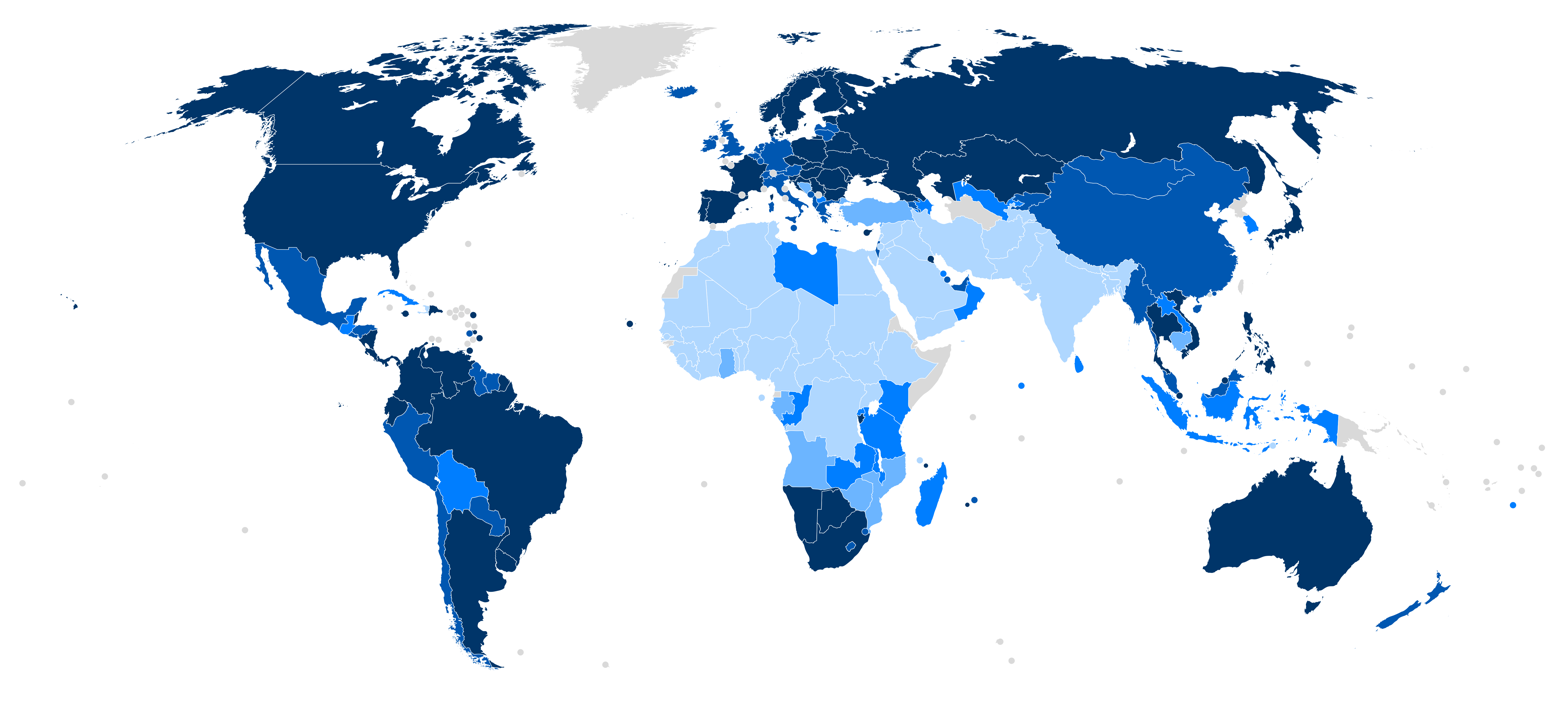
World map showing countries in Group 1 to 5 of the Gender Development Index (based on 2018 data, published in 2019). Countries in Group 1 are closest to gender parity, while those in Group 5 are furthest (i.e. have the greatest gender disparity).: Group 1 Group 2 Group 3 / Group 4 Group 5 Data unavailable

2018 rank	Country	Gender Development Index	Group	Human Development Index (women)	Human Development Index (men)
1	Kuwait	0.999271313598908	1	0.802241545091312	0.802826553883562
2	Kazakhstan	0.998616111258415	1	0.814121946939387	0.815250162460792
3	Trinidad and Tobago	1.00211774602851	1	0.797989701033099	0.796303332812547
4	Slovenia	1.00257442927832	1	0.901787072451453	0.899471446823739
5	Vietnam	1.00272297523169	1	0.693389879484458	0.691506923259876
6	Burundi	1.00324890931813	1	0.421654103634997	0.420288624008154
7	Dominican Republic	1.00339001174288	1	0.744042111285307	0.741528321567516
8	Philippines	1.00369597615498	1	0.712223593546365	0.709600925446362
9	Thailand	0.995480861692473	1	0.762715746885023	0.766178212194142
10	Panama	1.00461251995559	1	0.793862458409325	0.790217564125534
11	Ukraine	0.995122669191676	1	0.745224174704749	0.748876694076404
12	Brazil	0.995109362655928	1	0.757109191363106	0.760830135636948
13	Moldova	1.00705674095832	1	0.713558080174709	0.70855797012558
14	Bulgaria	0.992621622836447	1	0.811903568014688	0.817938627706547
15	Slovakia	0.992371676979385	1	0.852080306845641	0.858630215484618
16	Poland	1.00854973881397	1	0.874194924380356	0.86678414632122
17	United States	0.99144743381844	1	0.914844606387427	0.922736370262227
18	Namibia	1.0094706476123	1	0.647427874518634	0.641353838321097
19	Norway	0.990437581014824	1	0.94564679665501	0.954776772187986
20	Finland	0.989817373600636	1	0.919751993696064	0.929213830982077
21	Barbados	1.01032361432783	1	0.816388101546477	0.808046144788592
22	Belarus	1.010339927488	1	0.819686875325532	0.811298111679611
23	Botswana	0.989531869461814	1	0.723041706146159	0.730690671478228
24	Canada	0.989058149729888	1	0.915888363975847	0.926020744307072
25	Croatia	0.98859213038971	1	0.832316431348996	0.841920955835336
26	Singapore	0.98814794506132	1	0.929356109430028	0.940503002687878
27	Argentina	0.987919014775328	1	0.817640023795134	0.827638714880978
28	Venezuela	1.01272311153934	1	0.728475070383083	0.719323043073244
29	Brunei	0.986891147195856	1	0.836720430865344	0.847834569438376
30	Nicaragua	1.01321583363332	1	0.654849103183038	0.646307609342023
31	Colombia	0.986296673191879	1	0.754714364824177	0.765200152588724
32	Romania	0.986261546538915	1	0.809420161886165	0.820695245319724
33	Jamaica	0.986030910048998	1	0.718965693897112	0.729151273626285
34	Russia	1.01499805083001	1	0.828317933961805	0.816078349396287
35	France	0.98439750467821	1	0.883037148032378	0.897033102822659
36	Estonia	1.01574985871536	1	0.885869263158098	0.872133287105225
37	South Africa	0.984153359434317	1	0.698296318804934	0.709540146473014
38	Portugal	0.984006569463407	1	0.842559344988258	0.856253780345916
39	Uruguay	1.01607193850868	1	0.809691228698831	0.79688376187934
40	Hungary	0.983855072217788	1	0.836374771060734	0.850099567180554
41	Cape Verde	0.98384439453558	1	0.644164225448235	0.654741978534431
42	Cyprus	0.983090727880394	1	0.864740933228215	0.879614575444782
43	Czech Republic	0.983021479607738	1	0.881578351276749	0.896804769340881
44	Belize	0.982811514946144	1	0.712983445231243	0.725452881237674
45	Sweden	0.981817713523961	1	0.927549412691099	0.944726704269694
46	Spain	0.98068365758681	1	0.881897607495364	0.899268179573288
47	Denmark	0.980461996197969	1	0.920118047343707	0.938453556498605
48	Ecuador	0.979876022499264	1	0.747701339556282	0.763057083128946
49	Georgia	0.978843828928938	1	0.774556381501532	0.791297200442139
50	Costa Rica	0.977136852016496	1	0.781504112645575	0.799789825788274
51	Japan	0.976487130681848	1	0.901210670433948	0.92291095511383
52	Serbia	0.976372480770375	1	0.789117394155053	0.808213473542829
53	Australia	0.975113503181452	1	0.925664958786577	0.949289447604262
54	Ireland	0.974930720274505	2	0.928842297989999	0.9527264642235
55	Saint Lucia	0.974776845288729	2	0.734104181262105	0.753099732323518
56	Lesotho	1.02554956311433	2	0.522151801801454	0.50914341011059
57	Mauritius	0.973598560971563	2	0.781958849986583	0.803163522762666
58	Guyana	0.973439493655793	2	0.655984723050024	0.673883407572098
59	Armenia	0.972097105538784	2	0.745713315885668	0.767118132166803
60	Lithuania	1.02801557456846	2	0.880350319739633	0.856358932216745
61	Belgium	0.971637285832976	2	0.904498199776896	0.93090108105668
62	Suriname	0.971619589838185	2	0.710079630808469	0.730820619751736
63	Israel	0.971565636624078	2	0.89085212219952	0.916924280375936
64	Malaysia	0.971535181068249	2	0.791500865872141	0.814690894674394
65	Albania	0.971302380112087	2	0.778864159321813	0.801876094684266
66	Honduras	0.970407383075693	2	0.611426703399936	0.630072188303048
67	Luxembourg	0.970263947573514	2	0.893206480322808	0.920580922909261
68	Latvia	1.03040141727652	2	0.86528356437401	0.839753856959034
69	Mongolia	1.03051247212425	2	0.745684609993285	0.723605613871095
70	El Salvador	0.969303900072772	2	0.65414310778579	0.67485863591045
71	Germany	0.968046731183915	2	0.922788125514936	0.953247499102003
72	Paraguay	0.968014313475195	2	0.710081665159304	0.733544592548527
73	Italy	0.967274986133354	2	0.865859235918938	0.895153134663575
74	United Kingdom	0.96671693364499	2	0.903526469774669	0.934633953672392
75	Netherlands	0.966586563190941	2	0.915682504422063	0.94733626484437
76	Iceland	0.966035360302579	2	0.921422694662473	0.953818806771077
77	Montenegro	0.965505839872185	2	0.800863981950797	0.829476062057601
78	United Arab Emirates	0.965148016786254	2	0.831679159131191	0.861711514364929
79	Malta	0.964573668396	2	0.867003905508653	0.898846748481537
80	New Zealand	0.963450079812055	2	0.901877659315533	0.936091737613916
81	Switzerland	0.963384994370094	2	0.924302891740428	0.959432518818482
82	Hong Kong	0.96331458591632	2	0.91883629861405	0.953827868951074
83	Austria	0.962992625875126	2	0.894949094941461	0.929341586731435
84	Greece	0.96272210220035	2	0.854140900297802	0.887214387563783
85	Swaziland	0.962280698092814	2	0.594969468404531	0.618290972253447
86	Chile	0.961896022109213	2	0.827637034592205	0.860422556668226
87	China	0.960737178700119	2	0.7411723134053	0.771462091649362
88	Kyrgyzstan	0.959354156976191	2	0.655758696158308	0.683541830084114
89	Mexico	0.957251775460597	2	0.747167434728433	0.780533871947035
90	Qatar	1.04338023447896	2	0.87328373892252	0.836975543588494
91	Myanmar	0.953281245175706	2	0.566167394183869	0.593914332259327
92	Peru	0.951068629111926	2	0.73835574021778	0.776343281249042
93	Zambia	0.949346763894446	3	0.575199531528163	0.60588981118823
94	Cuba	0.94847909440168	3	0.752740766990656	0.793629265456294
95	North Macedonia	0.946858477421388	3	0.736774749145141	0.778125524261687
96	Madagascar	0.946436637249011	3	0.504225253132795	0.532761764800671
97	Tonga	0.944301733548051	3	0.691914784976437	0.732726373779583
98	Guatemala	0.943001743676744	3	0.628457412659945	0.666443531917134
99	Rwanda	0.942983702163843	3	0.519691032216798	0.551113482687214
100	Oman	0.942644918586126	3	0.792879654368817	0.841122291899752
–	World average	0.941430799701876	–	0.706980962068851	0.750964343096414
101	Azerbaijan	0.94043401604125	3	0.728006586417231	0.774117666948894
102	Maldives	0.938974186367784	3	0.689217295551526	0.734010908454909
103	Uzbekistan	0.938530667537194	3	0.685437015702195	0.730329907599989
104	Sri Lanka	0.937501402709405	3	0.749425007262443	0.799385478354042
105	Indonesia	0.937278216882204	3	0.681319036769408	0.726912270548411
106	Bahrain	0.936580181665306	3	0.799753662146286	0.853908376242029
107	Bolivia	0.936071128421922	3	0.677681643411889	0.723963834408994
108	Tanzania	0.93556520183438	3	0.509116716427692	0.54418090308346
109	South Korea	0.933514804909621	3	0.869859990274136	0.931811671008637
110	Kenya	0.93334124890745	3	0.553446092043308	0.592972926773739
111	Libya	0.930834633256552	3	0.670350699455828	0.720160891640427
112	Republic of the Congo	0.930508381323755	3	0.590608226344738	0.63471564383389
113	Malawi	0.929979500928547	3	0.466256425669024	0.501362046371437
114	Laos	0.929388949637999	3	0.580896379268115	0.625030434775856
115	Zimbabwe	0.924865126473049	4	0.540217146902477	0.584103704896499
116	Turkey	0.923845887665176	4	0.770530112179602	0.834046156904971
117	Bosnia and Herzegovina	0.92376150833791	4	0.735305564655512	0.795990694587958
118	Cambodia	0.919132552991075	4	0.556669111249323	0.605646170879042
119	Gabon	0.917044836281997	4	0.668897563298245	0.72940551741197
120	Ghana	0.912066262295093	4	0.567120060412223	0.621796994206474
121	Angola	0.901852522177659	4	0.545524138209497	0.60489284533157
122	Mozambique	0.901399241057088	4	0.42171001631638	0.467839329243092
123	São Tomé and Príncipe	0.899721720272795	5	0.571432940029916	0.635121868411333
124	East Timor	0.899338643290567	5	0.589475390655512	0.655454310846352
125	Liberia	0.898619930984625	5	0.437938141035413	0.487345234548226
126	Tunisia	0.898516211947261	5	0.68930089658175	0.767154657218593
127	Nepal	0.897374748629354	5	0.548886325033576	0.611657867431575
128	Bangladesh	0.895463713494037	5	0.574538067712771	0.64160954715961
129	Bhutan	0.893345815434905	5	0.580503137357053	0.649807865361129
130	Lebanon	0.890577064263023	5	0.678454800871403	0.761814814344947
131	Haiti	0.890365827551326	5	0.477397671690552	0.536181485090781
132	Comoros	0.888069540927266	5	0.504017390629825	0.567542706288025
133	Benin	0.883486835760026	5	0.485715005319931	0.549770506656267
134	Sierra Leone	0.882483208929897	5	0.410599830153055	0.465277782056556
135	Saudi Arabia	0.879136805709795	5	0.784333088515893	0.892162725325372
136	Egypt	0.878316588012583	5	0.64266778257163	0.731704024884503
137	Burkina Faso	0.874690316250611	5	0.403149171515835	0.460905035789063
138	Iran	0.873999741121421	5	0.726849370286313	0.831635681440477
139	Senegal	0.87347139391351	5	0.475960252557682	0.544906514253643
140	Palestine	0.871346924588787	5	0.623519218495938	0.71558090227976
141	Cameroon	0.86892158600649	5	0.522007757584777	0.600753584663367
142	Jordan	0.868301159101109	5	0.654288917853024	0.753527633811249
143	Nigeria	0.867675972564795	5	0.491676192340555	0.566658761896094
144	Algeria	0.864588565403417	5	0.684971930096163	0.792251895879002
145	Uganda	0.86268775649487	5	0.48376445336274	0.56076425070444
146	Mauritania	0.852934961025278	5	0.479113168207732	0.561722980181056
147	Democratic Republic of the Congo	0.844045244422387	5	0.418857464866842	0.496250014599019
148	Ethiopia	0.843899175273984	5	0.42770052294657	0.506814718485429
149	South Sudan	0.838915228792041	5	0.368735499184939	0.439538449809623
150	Sudan	0.836500123073206	5	0.456500034277483	0.545726200972158
151	Morocco	0.832807050749792	5	0.602993983556629	0.724050046182658
152	Gambia	0.832110339375305	5	0.415697194375194	0.499569798264101
153	India	0.828659271423645	5	0.573650381208353	0.692263275136976
154	Togo	0.817890855118709	5	0.458991965749326	0.561189751513615
155	Mali	0.807099598839839	5	0.380140424771307	0.470995680480746
156	Guinea	0.80606657004618	5	0.41342656240414	0.512893820147453
157	Tajikistan	0.798555909314393	5	0.561341006774011	0.702945154154523
158	Ivory Coast	0.796251100904936	5	0.445376820642565	0.559342172508641
159	Central African Republic	0.795444752528615	5	0.335149259100481	0.421335684263534
160	Syria	0.79532319946114	5	0.457372222910504	0.57507718022106
161	Iraq	0.789324230426714	5	0.587352897134761	0.744121204561571
162	Chad	0.774452360811538	5	0.347398235861034	0.448572763723
163	Pakistan	0.746878273640409	5	0.464284284133844	0.621633136911112
164	Afghanistan	0.722861973965333	5	0.410756365978411	0.568236234263597
165	Yemen	0.457536126892644	5	0.244873082377673	0.5351994476168
166	Niger	0.298179843688684	5	0.129771161871938	0.435211046684383

== Controversies ==
=== General debates ===
In the years since its creation in 1995, much debate has arisen surrounding the reliability, and usefulness of the Gender Development Index (GDI) in making adequate comparisons between different countries and in promoting gender-sensitive development. The GDI is particularly criticized for being often mistakenly interpreted as an independent measure of gender gaps; it is not, in fact, intended to be interpreted in that way, because it can only be used in combination with the scores from the Human Development Index (not on its own). Additionally, the data that is needed in order to calculate the GDI are not always readily available in many countries, making the measure very hard to calculate uniformly and internationally. There is also worry that the combination of so many different developmental influences in one measurement could result in muddled results and that perhaps the GDI (and the GEM) actually hide more than they reveal.

=== Criticism on Life Expectancy adjustment ===
More specifically, there has been a lot of criticism over the Life-Expectancy component of the GDI. The GDI life expectancy section is adjusted by assuming that women will live five years longer than men. This provision has been criticized on multiple grounds; e.g. it has been argued that if the GDI was really looking to promote true equality, it would strive to attain the same life expectancy for women and men, despite what might be considered a "normalized" advantage. In terms of policy, this could be achieved through providing better treatment to men, which women's rights organizations sometimes argue to be discriminatory against women. Critics also argue that the UN provides a number of strategies and plans giving preferential treatment to women and girls that are not seen as discriminatory towards men ─ not only for health issues but also for education and job opportunities. Furthermore, it has been argued that the GDI does not account for sex-selective abortion, meaning that the penalty levied against a country for gender inequality is smaller as it affects less of the population (see Sen, Missing Women).

=== Debates surrounding income gaps ===
Another area of debate surrounding the GDI is in the area of income gaps. The GDI considers income-gaps in terms of actual earned income. This has been said to be problematic because often, men may make more money than women, but their income is shared. Additionally, the GDI has been criticized because it does not consider the value of care work as well as other work performed in the informal sector (such as cleaning, cooking, housework, and childcare). Another criticism of the GDI is that it only takes gender into account as a factor for inequality; it does not, however, consider inequality among class, region or race, which could be very significant. Another criticism with the income-gap portion of the GDI is that it is heavily dependent on gross domestic product (GDP) and gross national product (GNP). For most countries, the earned-income gap accounts for more than 90% of the gender penalty.

== Suggested alternatives ==
As was suggested by Halis Akder in 1994, one alternative to the Gender Development Index (GDI) would be the calculation of a separate male and female Human Development Index (HDI). Another suggested alternative is the Gender Gap Measure which could be interpreted directly as a measure of gender inequality, instead of having to be compared to the HDI as the GDI is. It would average the female-male gaps in human development and use a gender-gap in labour force participation instead of earned income. In the 2010 Human Development Report, another alternative to the GDI, namely, the Gender Inequality Index (GII) was proposed in order to address some of the shortcomings of the GDI. This new experimental measure contains three dimensions: Reproductive Health, Empowerment, and Labour Market Participation.

== See also ==
Indices

- American Human Development Report
- Bhutan GNH Index
- Broad measures of economic progress
- Disability-adjusted life year
- Economics
- Full cost accounting
- Gender Parity Index
- Genuine Progress Indicator (GPI)
- Global Peace Index
- Green gross domestic product (Green GDP)
- Green national product
- Gross National Happiness
- Gross National Well-being (GNW)
- Happiness economics
- Happy Planet Index (HPI)
- Human Development Index (HDI)
- Human Poverty Index
- ISEW (Index of sustainable economic welfare)
- Legatum Prosperity Index
- Leisure satisfaction
- Living planet index
- Millennium Development Goals (MDGs)
- National Human Development Report
- OECD Better Life Index BLI
- Post-materialism
- Progress (history)
- Progressive utilization theory
- Psychometrics
- Subjective life satisfaction
- Where-to-be-born Index
- Wikiprogress
- World Happiness Report (WHR)
- Women Peace and Security Index (WPS)
- World Values Survey (WVS)
