= Gender Parity Index =

Socioeconomic index

Percentage of countries that have achieved gender parity in the gross enrolment ratio, by education level, 2000 and 2017

UNESCO defined the Gender Parity Index (GPI) as a socioeconomic index usually designed to measure the relative access to education of males and females. It is used by international organizations particularly in measuring the progress of developing countries. For example, some UNESCO documents consider gender parity in literacy.

UNESCO describes attempts to eliminate gender disparities in primary and secondary education and emphasize on the plight of girls in unequal access in third world countries.

GPI is often used in order to identify nations and regions that are in need of economic development and equality.

The World Economic Forum's Global Gender Gap Report 2022 allows users to look at and compare country GPI data, calculate their own country's gender parity and explore global patterns.

World GPI has consistently increased toward parity since 1980.

== Definition and calculation ==
The Institute for Statistics of UNESCO also uses a more general definition of GPI: for any development indicator one can define the GPI relative to this indicator by dividing its value for females by its value for males.

In its simplest form, GPI is calculated as the quotient of the number of females by the number of males enrolled in a given stage of education (primary, secondary, etc.).

A GPI value that is less than one is an indication that gender parity favor males while a GPI value greater than one designates that gender parity is in favor of females. The closer a GPI is to one, the closer a country is to achieving equality of access between males and females. A nation is said to have achieved gender parity when its GPI value falls within the range of 0.97 and 1.03.

== Application ==
=== Economics ===
The utilization of Gender Parity Index (GPI) by economists enables comprehensive monitoring and assessment of a nation's economic progress from a gender equality perspective. It is believed by many economists that gender inequality results in economic consequences such as increased unemployment, decreased output, and vast income inequality. As such, the monitoring of GPI by international organizations, such as UNESCO and the World Bank, serves the purpose of discerning the economic development deficiencies in nations and regions that are caused by gender inequality.

There is a present link between low-income countries a low GPI, particularly in secondary education and tertiary education. For example, many low-income, sub-Saharan countries have large gaps between male and female access to education.

Household income level is also a determining factor in secondary and tertiary GPI. In underdeveloped countries such as Cameroon, Guinea, Pakistan, and Yemen, gender parity existed among the top 20% of earners; yet low GPI levels were present among the bottom 20% of earners. As such, policymakers and other stakeholders utilize GPI in order to target regions in which economic development is a primary cause of gender disparity.

==== Education ====
In the education space, GPI is used to measure gender equality in education access. Governments and international organizations such as UNESCO and the United Nations monitor the gender gap in education access, using GPI to identify sectors where intervention is needed to address gender disparities.

A low GPI at the primary education level is an indication of economic, cultural, or other structural barriers that prevent women from receiving education, and a low GPI at the tertiary education level is an indication of structural barriers preventing women from breaking into specialized, advanced career fields.

GPI is also used to measure literacy equality, particularly by UNESCO. Gender disparities, specifically in primary education, have a drastic effect on literacy rates. For example, a low primary GPI is an indication that women in a particular nation or region are restricted from acquiring basic literacy skills.

== World gender parity index (1970–2020) ==
World gender parity index (as reported by World Bank)
Year	World GPI
1970	0.8
1971	0.8
1972	0.8
1973	0.8
1974	0.8
1975	0.82
1976	0.84
1978	0.85
1979	0.84
1980	0.85
1981	0.85
1982	0.85
1983	0.84
1984	0.85
1985	0.85
1986	0.87
1987	0.87
1988	0.87
1989	0.88
1990	0.88
1991	0.89
1992	0.9
1993	0.9
1994	0.91
1995	0.91
1996	0.91
1997	0.92
1998	0.92
1999	0.92
2000	0.92
2001	0.93
2002	0.93
2003	0.95
2004	0.95
2005	0.95
2006	0.96
2007	0.96
2008	0.97
2009	0.97
2010	0.97
2011	0.98
2012	0.98
2013	1
2014	1
2015	1
2016	1.01
2017	1
2018	0.98
2019	0.98
2020	0.98

== By country ==
Gender parity index by country (as reported by World Bank)
Country	Most recent year of calculation	Most recent value
Afghanistan	2017	0.42
Albania	2021	1.02
Algeria	2020	0.97
Andorra	1983	0.96
Angola	2018	0.94
Antigua and Barbuda	2019	0.98
Argentina	2020	1.01
Armenia	2021	1.01
Austria	2020	0.99
Azerbaijan	2021	1.01
Bahrain	2019	0.99
Bangladesh	2021	1.02
Barbados	2021	0.97
Belarus	2021	1
Belgium	2020	1.01
Belize	2021	0.96
Benin	2021	0.93
Bhutan	2021	1.04
Bolivia	2020	1
Bosnia and Herzegovina	N/A	No Data
Botswana	2021	0.98
Brazil	2020	0.95
Brunei	2020	1
Bulgaria	2020	0.99
Burkina Faso	2021	1.02
Burundi	2020	1.01
Cabo Verde	2019	0.94
Cambodia	2021	0.98
Cameroon	2019	0.9
Canada	2020	0.97
Central African Republic	2017	0.77
Chad	2021	0.8
Channel Islands	N/A	No Data
Chile	2020	0.97
China	2021	1.01
Colombia	2020	0.97
Comoros	2018	1
Congo	2018	0.97
Costa Rica	2021	0.99
Côte d'Ivoire	2021	0.95
Croatia	2020	1
Cuba	2021	0.98
Cyprus	2020	0.99
Czech Republic	2020	1
Denmark	2020	1
Djibouti	2021	0.92
Dominica	2021	0.95
Dominican Republic	2021	0.97
DR Congo	2020	0.95
Ecuador	2021	1.02
Egypt	2019	1.01
El Salvador	2014	0.96
Equatorial Guinea	2015	0.99
Eritrea	2019	0.86
Estonia	2020	1
Eswatini	2019	0.92
Ethiopia	2021	0.91
Fiji	2021	0.96
Finland	2020	1
France	2020	0.94
French Guiana	No Data	No Data
Gabon	2019	0.97
Gambia	2021	1.13
Georgia	2021	1.01
Germany	2020	1.03
Ghana	2020	1.02
Gibraltar	2021	1.12
Greece	2020	1.01
Grenada	2018	0.98
Guatemala	2021	0.98
Guinea	2020	0.85
Guinea-Bissau	2020	0.73
Guyana	2019	0.99
Haiti	1998	0.97
Holy See	No Data	No Data
Honduras	2012	1
Hong Kong	2021	1.08
Hungary	2020	0.98
Iceland	2020	1.01
India	2021	1.04
Indonesia	2018	0.99
Iran	2020	1.06
Iraq	2007	0.84
Ireland	2020	1.01
Isle of Man	No Data	No Data
Israel	2020	
Italy	2020	1.01
Jamaica	2007	1
Japan	2019	1.02
Jordan	2021	0.99
Kazakhstan	2020	1
Kenya	2020	1
Kuwait	2019	1.25
Kyrgyzstan	2021	1
Laos	2021	0.97
Latvia	2020	1
Lebanon	1985	0.91
Lesotho	2019	0.95
Liberia	2020	1
Libya	2006	0.96
Liechtenstein	2020	0.97
Lithuania	2020	1
Luxembourg	2020	0.99
Macao	2021	0.98
Madagascar	2019	1.02
Malawi	2019	1.03
Malaysia	2019	1.03
Maldives	2019	1.01
Mali	2020	0.91
Malta	2020	1
Mauritania	2020	1.07
Mauritius	2021	1.02
Mayotte	No data	No data
Mexico	2020	1.02
Moldova	2021	0.99
Monaco	No Data	No Data
Mongolia	2021	0.98
Montenegro	2021	1
Morocco	2021	0.97
Mozambique	2020	0.94
Myanmar	2018	0.96
Namibia	2021	0.97
Nepal	2021	0.97
Netherlands	2020	1
Nicaragua	2020	0.99
Niger	2021	0.91
Nigeria	2019	1.01
North Korea	2019	1.01
North Macedonia	2020	1
Norway	2020	1
Oman	2021	1
Pakistan	2019	0.88
Panama	2021	0.99
Paraguay	2015	0.97
Peru	2021	0.97
Philippines	2021	0.98
Poland	2020	0.96
Portugal	2020	0.99
Qatar	2021	1.02
Réunion	No Data	No Data
Romania	2020	0.99
Russia	2019	0.99
Rwanda	2021	0.99
Saint Helena	No Data	No Data
Saint Kitts and Nevis	2020	1
Taiwan	2021	0.90

== See also ==
=== Indices ===
- Bhutan GNH Index
- Broad measures of economic progress
- Disability-adjusted life year
- Full cost accounting
- Green national product
- Green gross domestic product (Green GDP)
- Gender-related Development Index
- Genuine Progress Indicator (GPI)
- Global Peace Index
- Gross National Happiness
- Gross National Well-being (GNW)
- Happiness economics
- Happy Planet Index (HPI)
- Human Development Index (HDI)
- ISEW (Index of sustainable economic welfare)
- Legatum Prosperity Index
- Leisure satisfaction
- Living planet index
- Millennium Development Goals (MDGs)
- OECD Better Life Index BLI
- Subjective life satisfaction
- Where-to-be-born Index
- Wikiprogress
- Women Peace and Security Index (WPS)
- World Happiness Report (WHR)
- World Values Survey (WVS)

=== Other ===
- Economics
- Democracy Ranking
- Demographic economics
- Economic development
- Ethics of care
- Human Development and Capability Association
- Human Poverty Index
- Progress (history)
- Progressive utilization theory
- Post-materialism
- Psychometrics
- International Association for Feminist Economics
- International development
- Sustainable development
- System of National Accounts
- Welfare economics
- Gender Empowerment Measure
- Gender-related Development Index
- Gender equality
- Gender inequality
