= Human Poverty Index =

Former indication of the poverty of community in a country

The Human Poverty Index (HPI) was an indication of the poverty of community in a country, developed by the United Nations to complement the Human Development Index (HDI) and was first reported as part of the Human Development Report in 1997. It is developed by United Nations Development Program which also publishes indexes like HDI. It was considered to better reflect the extent of deprivation in deprived countries compared to the HDI. In 2010, it was supplanted by the UN's Multidimensional Poverty Index.

The HPI concentrates on the deprivation in the three essential elements of human life already reflected in the HDI: longevity, knowledge and a decent standard of living. The HPI is derived separately for developing countries (HPI-1) and a group of select high-income OECD countries (HPI-2) to better reflect socio-economic differences and also the widely different measures of deprivation in the two groups.

== For developing countries (HPI-1) ==
The Human Development Reports website summarizes this as "A composite index measuring deprivations in the three basic dimensions captured in the human development index—a long and healthy life, knowledge and a decent standard of living." The formula for calculating it is:

- HPI-1 = $\left[\frac{1} {3}\left(P_1^\alpha+P_2^\alpha+P_3^\alpha\right)\right]^{\frac{1} {\alpha}}$
$P_1$: Probability at birth of not surviving to age 40 (times 100)

$P_2$: Adult illiteracy rate
$P_3$: Arithmetic average of 3 characteristics:

- The percentage of the population without access to safe water.
- The percentage of population without access to health services.
- The percentage of malnourished children under five.
$\alpha$: 3

== For selected high-income OECD countries (HPI-2) ==
The Human Development Reports website summarizes this as "A composite index measuring deprivations in the four basic dimensions captured in the human development index—a long and healthy life, knowledge and a decent standard of living—and also capturing social exclusion." The formula for calculating it is:

- HPI-2 = $\left[\frac{1} {4}\left(P_1^\alpha+P_2^\alpha+P_3^\alpha+P_4^\alpha\right)\right]^{\frac{1} {\alpha}}$
$P_1$: Probability at birth of not surviving to age 60 (times 100)

$P_2$: Adults lacking functional literacy skills
$P_3$: Population below income poverty line (50% of median adjusted household disposable income)
$P_4$: Rate of long-term unemployment (lasting 12 months or more)

$\alpha$: 3

The last report, 2007–2008, only has a ranking for 19 of the 22 countries with the highest Human Development Index. The ranking is as follows (with the country with the lowest amount of poverty at the top):

Ranking	Country	HPI-2	Probability at birth of not surviving to age 60 (%)	People lacking functional literacy skills (%)	Long-term unemployment (%)	Population below 50% of median income (%)
1	Sweden	6.3	6.7	7.5	1.1	6.5
2	Norway	6.8	7.9	7.9	0.5	6.4
3	Netherlands	8.1	8.3	10.5	1.8	7.3
4	Finland	8.1	9.4	10.4	1.8	5.4
5	Denmark	8.2	10.3	9.6	0.8	5.6
6	Germany	10.3	8.6	14.4	5.8	8.4
7	Switzerland	10.7	7.2	15.9	1.5	7.6
8	Canada	10.9	8.1	14.6	0.5	11.4
9	Luxembourg	11.1	9.2	—	1.2	6.0
10	Austria	11.1	8.8	—	1.3	7.7
11	France	11.2	8.9	—	4.1	7.3
12	Japan	11.7	6.9	—	1.3	11.8
13	Australia	12.1	7.3	17.0	0.9	12.2
14	Belgium	12.4	9.3	18.4	4.6	8.0
15	Spain	12.5	7.7	—	2.2	14.2
16	United Kingdom	14.8	8.7	21.8	1.2	12.5
17	United States	15.4	11.6	20.0	0.4	17.0
18	Ireland	16.0	8.7	22.6	1.5	16.2
19	Italy	29.8	7.7	47.0	3.4	12.7

The countries ranked in the top 22 by HPI that are not on this list are Iceland, New Zealand and Liechtenstein.

Not all countries are included in this ranking because data are not always available. The ranks of many countries, especially those at the bottom, could drop considerably if the list included more countries. For information about the component values for countries other than the ones on the list, see source links below.

Indicators used are:

- Probability at birth of not surviving to age 60 (% of cohort), 2000–2005. Varies from 7.1% for Japan to 11.8% for the USA. This is the indicator that is best known for all countries (including the ones not on the list). The US has specific values associated with disease characteristics of poverty. Worse values start only at position 35 of the HDI, indicating that many countries could climb on an extended list based on this, knocking down lower ranked countries on the above list.
- People lacking functional literacy skills (% of people scoring in the range called "Level 1" in the International Adult Literacy Survey, age 16–65, 1994–2003). Varies from 7.5% for Sweden to 47.0% for Italy. These figures are higher than most commonly cited illiteracy rates due to the choice of the literacy test.
- Long-term unemployment (12 months or more, % of labour force), 2005. Varies from 0.4% for the United States to 5.0% for Germany. This indicator has by far the greatest variation, with a value as high as 9.3% at HDI position 37.
- Population below 50% of median adjusted household disposable income (%), 1994–2002. Varies from 5.4% for Finland to 17% for the US.

== See also ==
Indices

- Bhutan GNH Index
- Broad measures of economic progress
- Disability-adjusted life year
- Full cost accounting
- Green national product
- Green gross domestic product (Green GDP)
- Gender-related Development Index
- Genuine Progress Indicator (GPI)
- Global Peace Index
- Gross National Happiness
- Gross National Well-being (GNW)
- Happiness economics
- Happy Planet Index (HPI)
- Human Development Index (HDI)
- Human Poverty Index country ranking in 2000
- ISEW (Index of sustainable economic welfare)
- Legatum Prosperity Index
- Leisure satisfaction
- Living planet index
- Millennium Development Goals (MDGs)
- OECD Better Life Index BLI
- Subjective life satisfaction
- Where-to-be-born Index
- Wikiprogress
- World Happiness Report (WHR)
- World Values Survey (WVS)

Other

- Economics
- Democracy Ranking
- Demographic economics
- Economic development
- Ethics of care
- Human Development and Capability Association
- Progress (history)
- Progressive utilization theory
- Post-materialism
- Psychometrics
- International Association for Feminist Economics
- International development
- Sustainable development
- System of National Accounts
- Welfare economics
