= Gender parity =

Statistical measure

Gender parity is a statistical measure used to describe ratios between men and women, or boys and girls, in a given population. Gender parity may refer to the proportionate representation of men and women in a given group, also referred to as sex ratio, or it may mean the ratio between any quantifiable indicator among men against the same indicator among women.

The terms gender parity and gender equality are sometimes used interchangeably but gender parity differs from gender equality in that it is a descriptive measure only and does not involve value judgments or argue for policy changes in the way gender equality. Gender parity is a goal of substantive gender equality, but not of formal gender equality. Gender parity may be one of the important metrics used to assess the state of substantive gender equality within a group or organization.

Within the field of sociology, gender parity is generally understood to refer to a binary distinction between people based in identity and sex differences. Though the word "gender" is part of the term, the meaning as it is used is closer to assigned sex than to gender identity.

== Health and survival ==
According to the World Economic Forum's Global Gender Gap Report 2020 global human health and survival is fairly close to gender parity at 95.7%. Irregularities in gender parity in health and survival over time and space make it difficult to draw statistically meaningful conclusions. On a global average, men die younger and experience greater rates of illness than women, but gender parity scores become irregular when calculated on the basis of a particular disease or cause of death. On average, gender parity scores for cardiovascular disease, suicide, certain cancers, and accidents fall below 1, meaning that these indicators are observed at greater rates among men. Global scores for stroke, lower respiratory infections, and breast cancer fall above 1, indicating that these are more often observed in women. The lower life expectancy among men is largely due to disproportionate rates of male infant mortality versus female.

== In education ==
Percentage of countries that have achieved gender parity in their gross enrollment ratio, by education level, 2000 and 2017

Gender parity in education can be calculated by dividing the number of female students at a given level of education by the number of male students at the same level. The resulting value is called a gender parity score. A gender parity score between 0 and 1 shows a greater number of male students and any number over 1 indicates a greater number of female students in the population of interest. A population is considered to have achieved gender parity if it scores between .97 and 1.03.

UNESCO gathers international gender parity scores relating to relative access to education among male and female individuals and compiles this data into the Gender Parity Index. This index is used by many organizations to assess gender parity and to monitor it over time.

=== Primary and secondary school ===
==== Enrollment rates ====
About 60% of countries have achieved gender parity in the enrollment rates of boys and girls between the ages of five and eighteen. The regions of the Middle East/North Africa, Eastern/Southern, and South Asia score lowest in this area, with far fewer girls enrolling in elementary and high school than boys.

=== Higher education ===
==== Enrollment rates ====
According to data from the World Bank, as of 2013 more women than men were enrolled in institutions of tertiary education globally. Africa was the only continent where more men than women were found to be enrolled but this is with only of 25 of 54 countries reporting. Mexico, Pakistan, Switzerland, and Greece have gender parity in tertiary education enrollment.

In the United States, the average enrollment rate of female students has steadily increased over the past 30 years, from 63% up to 71%, while the average enrollment rate of male students has remained steady at 61%.

The importance of gender parity in developing countries with mixed economies is evident in the relationship between the female-to-male enrollment ratio at the tertiary level of education, national economic prosperity, and the frequency of micro-, small-, and medium-sized enterprises (MSMEs) in the Philippines. In a 14-year study from 2008 to 2021, gender parity was found as a significant driver of social and governance factors, which positively affects the country's macroeconomic construct.

==== Graduation rates ====
Gender parity in graduation rates from colleges and universities varies widely from region to region and a global average cannot be assessed at this time due to lack of data. The Organization for Economic Co-operation and Development (OECD) does aggregate this data and across its 37 member countries more women hold tertiary degrees than do men. For the OECD countries, across the 25-34 age group, 39% of men and 51% of women hold tertiary degrees for a gender parity score of 1.3. Compare this to the US tertiary degree attainment gender parity score of 1.1, with 63% of female students and 57% for male students completing their degrees.

== In scientific authorship ==
Authorship of scientific research publications is a marker of academic achievement. Hence, gender parity in the scientific authorship is imperative but it varies between disciplines. However, there is marked gender disparity in STEM where women scientists are under represented. In translational and biomedical research, the proportion of men scientists at three prestigious author positions i.e. first, corresponding and last (mostly considered as a senior) authors is higher than women scientists; however, the representation of women scientists at these authorship positions in increasing.

== In the workplace ==
Women are employed at lower rates than men all over the world and on average they enjoy less job security. Globally, men are unemployed at a rate of 5.5% while 6.2% of women are unemployed, although regional gender parity averages vary widely. Women are especially underrepresented in leadership positions and in higher wage jobs and they are overrepresented in lower wage jobs. Globally, wage increases have stagnated in lower wage sectors and this disproportionately affects female workers who are more likely to be employed in these jobs. This difference is less pronounced in the higher income countries of the global north.

Worldwide, 63% of the informal or self-employed work is done by women. On average such jobs are lower paid, and have lower job security and safety than formal employment. Globally, women perform the vast majority of all unpaid labor such as care work, cooking, and cleaning. According to data from UN Women, women perform 2.5 times as much unpaid labor as men, averaging 4:11 hours a day compared with men's 1:31 in lower-income countries and 3:30 hours to men's 1:54 in high-income countries.

=== Representation in STEM ===
Women are underrepresented in the fields of science, technology, engineering, and mathematics (STEM). This trend can be seen globally although the variations in terminology that exist make it impossible to make precise comparisons. Jobs in STEM tend to be among the highest paying and because women are underrepresented in these fields, the average wage for men and women is affected resulting in a lower overall gender parity score.

=== Average income ===
On average, female workers in a given field are given lower pay than their male counterparts, averaging 77 cents for every dollar earned by men. Movement towards gender parity in pay has stagnated in lower-income countries since 2010 although it saw a modest increase from 2018 to 2019. High-income countries have historically seen lower gender parity in pay as compared to that of lower-income countries. Over the past twenty years, high-income have seen a steady progression towards gender parity and now match the average for lower-income countries.

The gender pay gap is calculated in two ways: the adjusted pay gap takes into account differences in hours worked, occupations chosen, level of education, and particular job, while the non-adjusted pay gap does not take any of these factors into its calculations and therefore demonstrates greater stratification.

Race, age, marital status, parenthood status, and other factors also play important compounding roles in pay inequality between men and women. Because women are less well represented in STEM fields which are experiencing the most job and wage growth, the global average wage parity statistics are further skewed in favor of men.

== In government and politics ==
Globally, men are more likely be involved in politics and to hold office than are women. According to the World Economic Forum's Global Gender Gap Report 2020, of all professions they assess, politics is the furthest from achieving gender parity. Progress is being made towards gender parity but it is happening more slowly than other sectors.

=== Women in executive government positions ===
The UN Women Facts and Figures on Women's Leadership and Political Participation, states that there are only 21 countries in which women serve as Heads of State or Government and 119 countries have never had a woman leader. Should we continue on this current trajectory, gender parity in the highest sectors of power will not be reached for another 130 years

As of 2021, there are 10 countries who have a woman as Head of State, and 13 countries who have a woman as Head of Government. Women make up only 21 percent of government ministers and only 14 countries have achieved 50 per cent or more women in cabinets. With an annual increase of just 0.52 percentage points, gender parity in ministerial positions will not be achieved before 2077. There is tremendous regional variation in gender parity: Nordic countries score 0.73; the Americas score 0.44; Europe excluding Nordic countries scores 0.37; sub-Saharan Africa scores 0.31; Asia scores 0.24; Arab states score 0.23; the Pacific scores 0.19.

=== Women in national parliaments ===
As of 2025, women make up 27.2 percent of all national parliamentarians, which is up from 11 percent in 1995. There are only 6 countries with 50 per cent gender parity in 2025 in single or lower houses; Rwanda, Cuba, Nicaragua, Mexico, Andorra and the United Arab Emirates. Globally, there are 21 States in which women account for less than 10 per cent of parliamentarians in single or lower houses, including three lower chambers with no women.

In June 2025, there were 27 countries (14%) that had reached or surpassed the 40 per cent goal.

=== Gender quotas ===
The purpose of implementing gender quotas, is to recruit women into political positions and to ensure that there is equal representation in policy Gender quotas rule that women must constitute a certain number or percentage of a body of government. According to International Idea's Gender Quota Database, there are three types of gender quotas: Reserved seats, Legal candidate quotas and Political party quotas. The quota system places the responsibility of creating more diversity on those doing the recruiting rather than on individual women. The main goal of this is to ensure that there is more equity and diversity in politics, so that governments better reflect the population they are representing.

=== United Nations ===
The U.N. declaration of human rights specifies that men and women are of equal worth. The UN is one of the political bodies that has explicitly expressed that gender parity in the participation at all levels of the UN system is a goal. To achieve this, the UN has a Strategy on Gender Parity that identifies and tracks gender balance in the following areas: leadership and accountability, senior management, hiring and retention, and qualitative social experience of men and women.

The United Nations is striving for gender parity in UN senior leadership by the year 2030. Some departments/agencies of the UN include the Food and Agriculture Organization, World Health Organization, UN Secretariat, World Food Programme, UNESCO, UN High Commission for Refugees, International Labour Organization, UNICEF, and UN Women. Out of these departments only UN Women has a greater percentage of women (75%) than men (25%) at the D1 Level management and above. As of 2015, the departments that are the closest to gender parity at D1 level management is UNICEF at 49% women, 51% men, and UNESCO at 47% women, 53% men.

Although gender parity has not yet been achieved, the United Nations have been adding women to the UN Peacekeeping missions. As of 2018, women made up 3% of UN Peacekeeping force in Mali, 4% of the peacekeeping force in Central African Republic, Democratic Republic of the Congo and Golan Heights, 5% in Darfur, Lebanon and South Sudan, 7% in Haiti, 8% in Cyprus and Somalia, and 10% in Liberia and Sudan.

== Global Gender Gap Index ==
The Global Gender Gap Index finds gender parity by country as a whole using a variety of measures including health and survival rates, education rates/levels, opportunity to participate and engagement in politics and pay gap.

The Global Gender Gap Index of 2017 shows that the most gender parity in the world is in Canada, Nicaragua, Bolivia, Norway, Sweden, Finland, Latvia, Germany, France, UK, Ireland, Iceland, Slovakia, Bulgaria, Namibia, Rwanda, Philippines, and New Zealand. Countries with the least gender parity in the world are Morocco, Algeria, Mauritania, Mali, Côte d'Ivoire, Chad, Turkey, Syria, Iran, Pakistan, Egypt, Jordan, Kuwait, Qatar, Saudi Arabia and Yemen.

== Indices ==
- Gender Parity Index
- Gender Development Index
- Gender Empowerment Measure
- Global Gender Gap Report
- Measures of gender equality

== See also ==
- Gender diversity
- Gender equality
- Gender inequality
- Women in the workforce

== Bibliography ==
- United for Gender Parity – un.org
- Gender Inequality Index. United Nations Development Programs. Retrieved 2 October 2020.
- Global Gender Gap 2020 (PDF). World Economics Forum insight Report. Retrieved 2 October 2020.
- Universal Declaration of Human Rights. Retrieved 2 October 2020.
- Geiger, A.W., Parker, Kim (March 15, 2018). "For Women's History Month, a look at gender gains – and gaps – in the U.S." Pew Research. Retrieved 2 October 2020.
- "Gender Equality Index 2019 in brief: Still far from the finish line." European Institute for Gender Equality. Retrieved 2 October 2020.
- "Women Making Progress in U.S. But Gaps Remain." Population Reference Bureau. Retrieved 2 October 2020.
- Reeves, Richard V. (June 2020). "100 years on, politics is where the U.S. lags most on gender equality." Brookings Institution. Retrieved 2 October 2020.
