= Projet PIBien-être =

The "Projet PIBien-être" is the first official initiative for measuring well-being and quality of life in Luxembourg.

In 2013, a joint commission led by the Conseil économique et social, the Conseil supérieur pour un développement durable and the Observatoire de la Compétitivité introduced a set of indicators measuring the quality of life in Luxembourg. The conclusions of the commission were summarised in a document titled "Projet PIBien-être", which identified 64 indicators belonging to 11 different domains to assess quality of life in Luxembourg.

In 2015, within the "Projet PIBien-être", STATEC (National Institute of Statistics and Economic Studies of the Grand Duchy of Luxembourg) presented a preliminary analysis of the "Luxembourgish Index of Well-being" (LIW), a first proposal of synthetic indicator measuring the quality of life in Luxembourg. The presentation entitled "Preliminary Assessment of Quality of Life in Luxembourg" was delivered by Marcin Piekałkiewicz on 16 December 2015.

The results were published by STATEC in 2016 in "Rapport travail et cohésion sociale".

== Quality of life domains ==
The quality of life domains identified in the "Projet PIBien-être" are as follows:

1. Income and wealth;
2. Occupation;
3. Housing;
4. Health;
5. Private and working life balance;
6. Education and skills;
7. Social relationships;
8. Governance;
9. Environment;
10. Safety and physical integrity;
11. Subjective well-being.

In total the "Projet PIBien-être" includes 63 indicators calculated based on international surveys – e.g. European Union Statistics on Income and Living Conditions (EU-SILC), European Union Labour Force Survey (EU-LFS), European Value Study (EVS), Eurobarometer – as well as administrative data available at STATEC and in other Luxembourgish institutes, such as the IGSS (L'Inspection générale de la sécurité sociale).

== See also ==
- Happiness economics
- OECD Better Life Index
- Gross National Happiness
- Happy Planet Index
