= Index of Sustainable Economic Welfare =

Economic indicator

The Index of Sustainable Economic Welfare (ISEW) is an economic indicator intended to replace the gross domestic product (GDP), which is the main macroeconomic indicator of System of National Accounts (SNA). Rather than simply adding together all expenditures like the GDP, consumer spending is balanced by such factors as income distribution and cost associated with pollution and other unsustainable costs. The calculation excludes defence expenditures and considers a wider range of harmful effects of economic growth. It is similar to the genuine progress indicator (GPI).

The Index of Sustainable Economic Welfare (ISEW) is roughly defined by the following formula:

ISEW = personal consumption
+ public non-defensive expenditures
- private defensive expenditures
+ capital formation
+ services from domestic labour
- costs of environmental degradation
- depreciation of natural capital

== History ==
GDP is misleading as an indicator or even as a proxy of the welfare of a nation, let alone as a measure of people's well-being, although the makers of economic policy commonly think to the contrary. This problem already became apparent in practical economic policies in most industrialised countries in the early 1970s. The most famous examples of this development are the MEW index developed by William Nordhaus and James Tobin in their Measure of Economic Welfare (MEW) in 1972, the Japanese Net National Welfare (NNW) indicator in 1973, the Economic Aspects of Welfare index (EAW) index of Zolatas in 1981, the ISEW indicator of Daly and Cobb in 1989 and the UN's human development index (HDI) in 1990. They are all based on neoclassical welfare economics and use as the starting point the System of National Accounts (SNA). The basic idea behind all these approaches is the inclusion of nonmarket commodities, positive and negative, to yield an aggregated macroindicator in monetary terms.

The EAW index, applied to the United States for the period from 1950 to 1977, showed that the economic aspects of social welfare are a diminishing function of economic growth in industrially mature, affluent societies. The percentage increases in social welfare over time are smaller than the corresponding increases in the GDP, and are diminishing. When the elasticity of the EAW/GDP ratio reaches zero, economic welfare will have attained its maximum value. Beyond that point any further increase in the GDP would lead to an absolute decline in economic welfare.

The ISEW was originally developed in 1989 by leading ecological economist and steady-state theorist Herman Daly and theologian John B. Cobb, but later they went on to add several other "costs" to the definition of ISEW. This later work resulted in yet another macroeconomic indicator Genuine Progress Indicator (GPI): see sustainability measurement. The GPI is an extension of ISEW that stresses genuine and real progress of the society and seeks especially to monitor welfare and the ecological sustainability of the economy. The ISEW and GPI summarise economic welfare by means of a single figure according to the same logic by which GDP summarises economic output into a single figure. Beside economic issues, social and environmental issues in monetary terms are included in the calculation.

== Trend of ISEW in the United States ==
The calculation of the ISEW in the United States from 1950 to 1986 was done by Cobb and Daly in 1989. The results reveal that the increase in economic welfare of an average American has stabilised after the 1970s although the economy, measured by GDP, has continued to grow. According to Cobb and Daly's calculations the external effects of production and the inequity of income distribution are the main reasons for this development in which an increase in production does not necessarily lead to an increase in welfare.

== Other countries and regions to calculate ISEW ==
Besides the USA there have been at least seven other countries or regions which have compiled the ISEW, namely the UK (Jackson & Marks 1994), Germany (Diefenbacher 1994), The Netherlands (Rosenberg & Oegema 1995), Austria (Stockhammer et al. 1995), British Columbia (Gustavson & Lonergan 1994), Sweden (Jackson & Stymne 1996), Chile (Castaneda 1999), Finland (Hoffrén 2001), Poland (Gil & Śleszyński 2003), Belgium (Bleys, 2008), Flanders (Bleys & Van der Slycken, 2019), Pakistan (Riaz et al., 2020) and China (Zhu et al., 2021).

== Progress of the Finnish ISEW ==
The calculation of the ISEW for Finland has been done by Dr. Jukka Hoffrén at Statistics Finland in 2001. Today the time period covered is extended to years from 1945 to 2010. According to the results, sustainable economic welfare rose steadily in the 1970s and early 1980s, but has since declined and stabilised. One of the underlying reasons for this development was effective income distribution which apportioned evenly the welfare derived from increased production. In the mid-1980s income disparities started to grow again, flows of capital (investments) abroad increased and environmental hazards escalated, resulting in a decline in the weighted personal consumption.

Major contributors to Finnish ISEW in 2000 (FIM billion, rp)

Weighted personal consumption + 467.8

Household work + 82.8

Other positive contributions + 21.7

Long-term environmental damage - 228.0

Environmental deterioration - 192,5

ISEW + 151,8

== See also ==
=== Indices ===
- Bhutan GNH Index
- Broad measures of economic progress
- Disability-adjusted life year
- Full cost accounting
- Green national product
- Green gross domestic product (Green GDP)
- Gender-related Development Index
- Genuine Progress Indicator (GPI)
- Global Peace Index
- Gross National Happiness
- Gross National Well-being (GNW)
- Happiness economics
- Happy Planet Index (HPI)
- Human Development Index (HDI)
- Legatum Prosperity Index
- Leisure satisfaction
- Living planet index
- Millennium Development Goals (MDGs)
- OECD Better Life Index BLI
- Subjective life satisfaction
- Where-to-be-born Index
- Wikiprogress
- World Happiness Report (WHR)
- World Values Survey (WVS)

=== Other ===
- Economics
- Democracy Ranking
- Demographic economics
- Economic development
- Ethics of care
- Human Development and Capability Association
- Human Poverty Index
- Progress (history)
- Progressive utilization theory
- Post-materialism
- Psychometrics
- International Association for Feminist Economics
- International development
- Sustainable development
- System of National Accounts
- Welfare economics
