= International rankings of Guyana =

International rankings of Guyana

== Demographics ==
Guyana's population history, in thousands

- List of countries by population ranked 162
- List of countries by suicide rate ranked 1

== Economy ==
- The Heritage Foundation/The Wall Street Journal 2012 Index of Economic Freedom ranked 137

== Environment ==
- New Economics Foundation 2012 Happy Planet Index ranked 31

== Politics ==
- Transparency International 2011 Corruption Perceptions Index ranked 134
