= Wikiprogress =

Defunct online platform

Wikiprogress is a defunct online platform for sharing information on the measurement of social, economic and environmental progress. It is thought to facilitate sharing on ideas, initiatives and knowledge on "measuring the progress of societies". Like Wikipedia, it was open to all members and communities for contribution – anyone interested in "progress" could register.

== About ==
Wikiprogress is the official platform for the OECD-hosted Global Project on "Measuring the Progress of Societies". The core mission of wikiprogress is "to create global information tool supported by a worldwide partnership of organisations and individuals wishing to develop new, smarter measures of progress. Wikiprogress aims to provide a health check for all societies that enables every citizen to better understand the economic, social and environmental factors that determine whether or not their lives are getting better." The idea is not just to develop progress indicators, but creating a community working together to determine what and how we measure the well-being of societies. Such decisions can not be taken by a single organisation or NSO, but by individuals, governments, and organisations all over the world.

The Global Project was closely linked to the Istanbul Declaration signed at the 2nd OECD World Forum on "Measuring and Fostering the Progress of Societies" in 2007. The Istanbul Declaration was signed by organisations such as the European Commission, OECD, Organisation of the Islamic conference, United Nations, United Nations Development Program (UNDP), and the World Bank. The Declaration was also signed by AFRISTAT, EFTA, International Labour Office (ILO), UNESCO, UNICEF, and the United Nations University – Comparative Regional Integration Studies. Furthermore, many high-ranking individuals also signed the declaration. Wikiprogress was presented in beta in 2009 at the OECD World Forum on Statistics, Knowledge and Policy in Busan, Korea. The wikiprogress platform also hosts the wikichild, a wiki dedicated to child well-being. Child well-being can be considered an important part of a society's well-being into the future. Their well-being is key to the sustainability of our societies.

The project had an important number of correspondents that support and contribute to the network.

The OECD hosted a world forum every two or three years in co-operation with a selected host country. The 4th OECD World Forum was held in India in 2012.

== Current status ==
In December 2020, the OECD announced that Wikiprogress would close down at the end of December 2020, stating that all content will be archived but no longer accessible online.

== See also ==
Indices

- Bhutan GNH Index
- Broad measures of economic progress
- Disability-adjusted life year
- Full cost accounting
- Green national product
- Green gross domestic product (Green GDP)
- Gender-related Development Index
- Genuine Progress Indicator (GPI)
- Global Peace Index
- Gross National Happiness
- Gross National Well-being (GNW)
- Happiness economics
- Happy Planet Index (HPI)
- Human Development Index (HDI)
- ISEW (Index of sustainable economic welfare)
- Legatum Prosperity Index
- Leisure satisfaction
- Living planet index
- Millennium Development Goals (MDGs)
- OECD Better Life Index BLI
- Subjective life satisfaction
- Where-to-be-born Index
- World Happiness Report (WHR)
- World Values Survey (WVS)
- Social Progress Imperative

Other

- Economics
- Democracy Ranking
- Demographic economics
- Economic development
- Ethics of care
- Human Development and Capability Association
- Human Poverty Index
- Progress (history)
- Progressive utilization theory
- Post-materialism
- Psychometrics
- International Association for Feminist Economics
- International development
- Sustainable development
- System of National Accounts
- Welfare economics
