= Where-to-be-born Index =

Index by the Economist Intelligence Unit

The Where-to-be-born Index, formerly known as the Quality-of-life Index (QLI), was last published by the Economist Intelligence Unit (EIU) in 2013. Its purpose was to assess which country offered the highest quality of life in the years following its release.

It was based on a method that combines the results of subjective life-satisfaction surveys with the objective determinants of quality of life across countries, as well as forecasts for economic growth.

== Methodology ==
In 2013, an index was created using data from 80 countries and territories. The survey considered ten quality-of-life factors and future GDP per capita forecasts to determine each nation's score. Switzerland, Australia, and Norway topped the list with scores just above 8.

Back in 2006, life satisfaction scores (rated on a scale of 1 to 10) for 130 countries (from the Gallup Poll) were analyzed through multivariate regression. Researchers identified 11 statistically significant indicators that explained about 85% of the variation in life satisfaction scores across countries. These predicted scores represent a country's quality of life index, with coefficients automatically weighing the importance of different factors. The estimated equation from 2006 allows for comparisons over time and across nations.

The independent variables in the estimating equation for 2006 include:

- Material well-being as measured by GDP per capita (in USD, at 2006 constant PPPS)
- Life expectancy at birth
- The quality of family life based primarily on divorce rates
- The state of political freedoms
- Job security (measured by the unemployment rate)
- Climate (measured by two variables: the average deviation of minimum and maximum monthly temperatures from 14 degrees Celsius; and the number of months in the year with less than 30mm rainfall)
- Personal physical security ratings (based primarily on recorded homicide rates and ratings for risk from crime and terrorism)
- Quality of community life (based on membership in social organizations)
- Governance (measured by ratings for corruption)
- Gender equality (measured by the share of women holding seats in national Houses of Assembly)

== See also ==
- Economic democracy
- Economic imperialism
- Happiness
- Philosophy of happiness
- Political economy
- Postmaterialism
- Progress (history)
- Socionomics
- Utilitarianism

=== Measurement and metrics ===
- Ecological footprint
- Happiness economics
- Income inequality metrics
- Leisure satisfaction
- Life satisfaction
- Organization for Security and Co-operation in Europe statistics
- Psychometrics
- Wikiprogress

=== Indices ===
- Canadian Index of Wellbeing
- Bhutan GNH Index
- Broad measures of economic progress
- Disability-adjusted life year
- Full cost accounting
- Green national product
- Green gross domestic product (Green GDP)
- Gender-related Development Index
- Genuine Progress Indicator (GPI)
- Global Peace Index
- Gross National Happiness
- Gross National Well-being (GNW)
- Happiness economics
- Happy Planet Index (HPI)
- Human Development Index (HDI)
- ISEW (Index of sustainable economic welfare)
- Legatum Prosperity Index
- Leisure satisfaction
- Living planet index
- Millennium Development Goals (MDGs)
- OECD Better Life Index BLI
- Subjective life satisfaction
- Wikiprogress
- World Happiness Report (WHR)
- World Values Survey (WVS)
