= Broad measures of economic progress =

Although for many decades, it was customary to focus on GDP and other measures of national income, there has been growing interest in developing broad measures of economic well-being. National and international approaches include the Beyond GDP programme developed by the European Union, the Better Lives Compendium of Indicators developed by the OECD, as well as many alternative metrics of wellbeing or happiness. One of the earliest attempts to develop such an index at national level was Bhutan's Gross National Happiness Index and there are a now a number of similar projects ongoing around the world, including a project to develop for the UK an assessment of national well-being, commissioned by the Prime Minister David Cameron and led by the Office for National Statistics.

== GNH ==
The Gross National Happiness (GNH) phrase was initially used as an off-hand remark by the King of Bhutan to indicate his lack of interest in western materialistic style of economic development. The implementation of the GNH philosophy was meant to prohibit TV and Jeans from becoming part of the culture of the Bhutanese population. Despite modernization of the GNH concept by Karma Ura, Up to date the GNH is seen by some to hide some values that are in contradiction to western lifestyle.

In 2005, a US based think tank, the International Institute of Management, published a working paper followed by a policy white paper in 2006 calling for the implementation of GNH philosophy in the United States. The papers called for a secular and more scientific implementation of a public policy framework and econometric measurement tool also known as Gross National Well-being or GNW and launched the first secular global gross national happiness index survey. Despite, the differences in the visions, both papers credited the King of Bhutan for the inspiration.

The American GNH framework and GNH Index Survey was referenced by various researchers and policy makers as an answer to the failures of unchecked capitalism and hyper-focus on GDP. Among the prominent proposals was a report to US congress, UK Prime Minister Office, and Government of Goa.

Later happiness and well-being development frameworks were similar to the proposal. For example the Bhutan GNH Index published in 2012 after 2 years of research was not dissimilar from the first secular GNH framework and Index of 2005. The main difference was the addition of spiritual elements such as Karma and prayers indicators to fit the local Bhutanese culture. The Bhutan GNH philosophy was initially dismissed due to its generality and was considered as touchy-feely concept, but later taken seriously after it published an econometric framework.

== Beyond GDP ==
In 2007, the European Commission, the European Parliament, Club of Rome, OECD and WWF hosted a conference titled "Beyond GDP". The consensus was to widen measures of economic growth and come up with measures that can inform policy making. The conference was attended by over 650 policy makers, experts and social activists. Spurred by its success the European Union released a communication titled GDP and beyond: Measuring progress in a changing world that identified five actions to improve the indicators of progress in ways that make it more responsive to the concerns of its citizens:

- Complementing GDP with highly aggregated environmental and social indicators
- Near real-time information for decision-making
- More accurate reporting on distribution and inequalities
- Developing a European sustainable development scoreboard
- Extending national accounts to environmental and social issues.

Following this communication and its adoption by the European Parliament in June 2008, many European governments and policy makers have started work on developing new measures of economic development.

In August 2013, the European Commission published the Staff Working Document on "Progress on 'GDP and beyond' actions", in which reviews what had been achieved on the five steps identified in the communication GDP and beyond: Measuring progress in a changing world. Some of the most significant actions taken include:

- The European Statistical System adopted the first set of indicators on 'quality of life and well-being' and it also decided for the EU-SILC (EU Statistics on Income and Living Conditions) to be the core instrument for building up such indicators.
- The time taken to publish key environmental indicators such as greenhouse gas emissions has been shortened by as much as eight months by using advanced statistical methods to arrive at so-called 'early estimates', which have proven to be sufficiently accurate to inform policy decisions. Since 2012, Eurostat has produced 'early estimates'—within four months—for CO2 emissions from energy use.
- A consensus has not been reached on the EU Sustainable Development Scoreboard. However, a preliminary scoreboard of resource efficiency indicators (REI) is currently being tested and discussed.
- The EU actively supported the finalisation and adoption by the United Nations Statistical Commission (UNSC) of the System of Environmental Economic Accounting (SEEA) as the international statistical standard.
- Since 2010, European statistics have been published on 'annual adjusted disposable income in purchasing power standards' and the quarterly 'real disposable income of households'.
- Summary indices on poverty and human development have been calculated for all 277 European regions.

In addition, the European Commission provides a list of different indicators that can be categorised into five categories :

- GDP and other macro-economic indicators - provided by the System of National Accounts (SNA).
- Enlarged GDP measures - include costs such as expense of environmental degradation, resource depletion or higher income inequality. They provide a more accurate indication of a country's actual economic, environmental and social performance.
- Social indicators – combine several aspects of social progress.
- Environmental indicators – relate to the environmental development and linked issues such as human health.
- Well-being – include both subjective and objective measures to report on quality of life and life satisfaction.

== Measuring national well-being in the UK ==
In 2010, the Measuring National Well-being programme was launched in the UK. It is led by the Office for National Statistics (ONS) and its aim is to develop accepted and trusted measures of the well-being of the nation.

Following a national debate in 2011 asking “what matters” to the general public, the programme has published a series of releases on experimental methodology such as the value of the non-market production of households collected in the Household Satellite Accounts and ad-hoc analysis like the Commuting and Personal Well-being release. It has also established a series of periodic publications. For example, the Human Capital estimates and the Life in the UK report are published annually.

The Life in the UK report was first published in November 2012 and included the National Well-being Wheel of measures, which is being updated twice a year, with the May 2014 update being the latest. The wheel includes headline indicators in areas such as health, relationships, job satisfaction, economic security, education, environmental conditions and measures of 'personal well-being' (individuals' assessment of their own well-being).

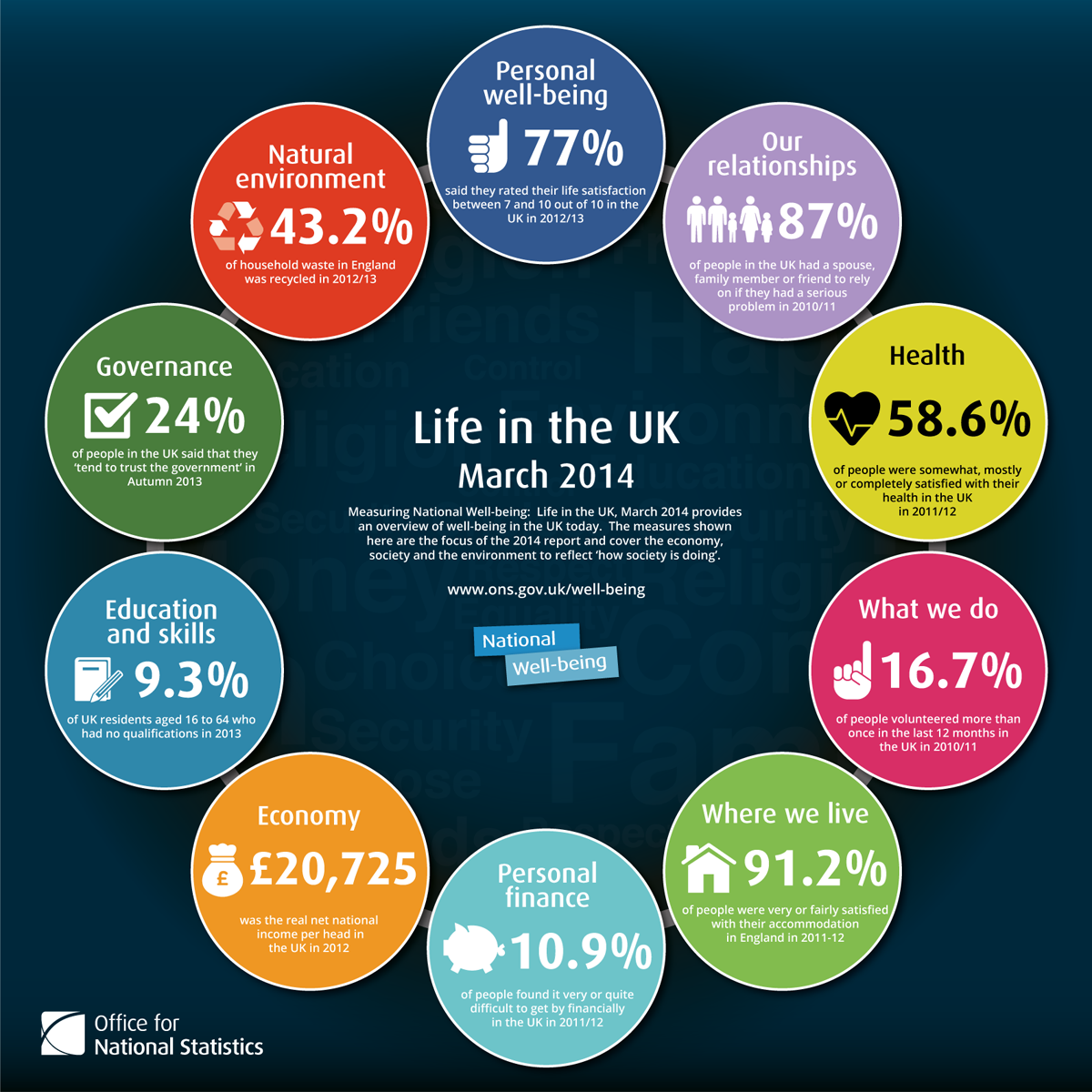
A Summary of National Well-being Measures from March 2014

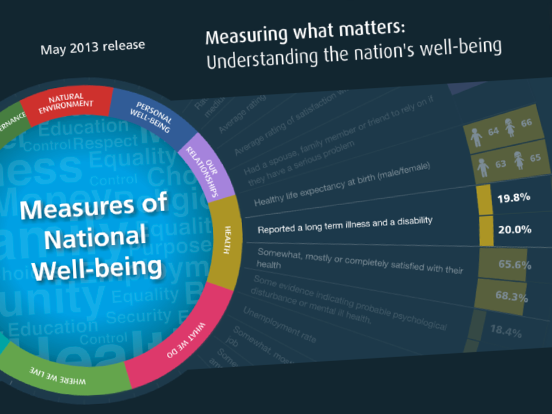
National Well-being Wheel of measures

The programme will continue developing and improving the measurement of the well-being of the citizens in the United Kingdom in order to report on the findings to inform both public debate and policy-making.

== World Bank ==
The World Bank suggests the usage of Human Development Index (HDI) and the Gross National Happiness Index (NHI). The HDI is a composite index of

1. life expectancy at birth, as an index of population health and longevity,
2. knowledge and education as measured by the adult literacy rate and functions of school enrollment rate and
3. standard of living measured as a logarithmic function of GDP, adjusted to purchasing power parity.

The NHI focuses on the spiritual and material development of human beings by focussing on the four pillars of sustainable development, preservation of cultural values, conservation of natural resources and establishment of good governance. The bank also notes suggestions made by President Nicolas Sarkozy for the modification of the definition of GDP that stops the social and cultural damage that the current definitions are leading to. The Bank also suggests Adjusted Net Savings as an alternative to GDP.

== Suggested measures ==
Some other measures that have been suggested as a replacement of GDP are Index of Sustainable Economic Welfare (ISEW) as suggested by Friends of the Earth and Environmentally Sustainable National Income (eSNI) by Dr. Hueting.

Numerous other measures have been suggested to supplement, not simply replace GDP, creating a "dashboard" of metrics to track the economy and well-being.

== See also ==
- Bhutan GNH Index
- Disability-adjusted life year
- Economics
- Green national product
- Gender Development Index
- Genuine progress indicator
- Green gross domestic product
- Gross National Happiness
- Gross National Well-being
- Happiness economics
- Happy Planet Index
- Human Development Index
- Index of Sustainable Economic Welfare

- Median income
- Progress (history)
- Progressive utilization theory
- Legatum Prosperity Index
- Leisure satisfaction
- OECD Better Life Index
- Post-materialism
- Psychometrics
- Subjective life satisfaction
- Where-to-be-born Index
- Wikiprogress
- World Happiness Report
- World Values Survey
