= OECD Better Life Index =

Measurement of well-being across countries

The OECD Better Life Index, created in May 2011 by the Organisation for Economic Co-operation and Development, is an initiative pioneering the development of economic indicators which better capture multiple dimensions of economic and social progress.

The platform consists of a dashboard, that provides data and insights into key indicators - measuring areas such as wellbeing, environmental quality, quality of public services and security - alongside an interactive tool Your Better Life Index (BLI), which encourages citizens to create their own indexes by ranking each of the indicators according to the importance in their lives.

The index and tool were created as part of the OECD Better Life Initiative. This initiative began in 2011 in line with the recommendations of the Commission on the Measurement of Economic Performance and Social Progress, also known as the Stiglitz-Sen-Fitoussi Commission, whose recommendations sought to address concerns that standard macroeconomic statistics like GDP failed to give a true account of people's current and future well-being. The initiative's goals are to develop social and wellbeing indicators that can better reflect growth focusing on four key areas; environmental sustainability, increased wellbeing, falling inequality, and systems resilience. The 'beyond growth' approach to economic progress is relatively new and the OECD Better Life Initiative promotes the co-production of what we might standardise by facilitating conversation between the public and policymakers.

Users can create their own economic index by ranking 11 areas of socio economic progress according to what is important to them. This generates a ranking so users can see how their country compares. Users are encouraged to share their indicators with others on the platform to view the latter's and discuss similarities and differences.

Users can also choose to share their data with the OECD and will then be asked to provide more demographic data about their situation. The OECD Better Life Initiative then analyses all users' input data and reports the findings in a biennial report named How's Life? Well-being. The data used in the report consists of 80+ indicators including measures on inequality and further socio-economic indicators. The findings reflect what is important to citizens, and how their current socio-economic situations reflect in the areas of governance that they prioritise. These insights are used to encourage governments to put well-being at the centre of their policymaking by shedding light on what well-being means to their citizens. In this way, by using the tool, citizens can shape public policy.

== Methodology and calculation ==
First published on 24 May 2011, the index consists of 11 topics of well-being. Each of the 11 topics is made up of 1-4 indices and these are fine-tuned over time as insights are derived from data collected in previous years.

Initially, each of the 11 topics are equally weighted to generate scores and ranks of 30+ countries by each area of well-being. The topics are given below:

1. Housing: housing conditions and spending (e.g. real estate pricing)
2. Income: household income (after taxes and transfers) and net financial wealth
3. Jobs: earnings, job security and unemployment
4. Community: quality of social support network
5. Education: education and what one gets out of it
6. Environment: quality of environment (e.g. environmental health)
7. Governance: involvement in democracy
8. Health
9. Life Satisfaction: level of happiness
10. Safety: murder and assault rates
11. Work–life balance

The official definitions for the topics and the indices which make them up are stated in the OECD Better Life Index definitions

Users create their own economic indexes by scoring each of the 11 topics from 0 to 5, where 0 reflects that this topic is not important to the user and 5 it is very important.

The score that the user inputs for a topic is then used to calculate the weighting for that topic in the index. The weights are calculated using the formula $\frac{\text{Topic Score}}{\sum_{i=0}^{10} \text{Topic Score}}$ which ensures the sum of weights totals 100%.

Each of the 11 topics consists of between 1-4 individual measures that make up that topic. The individual measures come in many units (percent, dollar, years etc.) and so to calculate the total score for that topic, the measures are normalised, resulting in a score χ between 0 and 1 per measure. If the indicator is something negative, for example, unemployment, then we take the score as 1-χ.

For each topic, the scores are then added up and divided by the total number of measures used to make up that topic, this gives the total score for the topic. For example, a country's score for health would be calculated by: $\frac{{\text{Life Expectancy Score} + \text{Self-reported Health Score}}} {2}$

In 2012, OECD relaunched "with new indicators on inequality and gender plus rankings for Brazil and Russia. Some indicators have been removed or updated, Governance has been renamed civic engagement, the employment rate of women with children has been replaced by the full integration of gender information in the employment data and students' cognitive skills (e.g. student skills in reading, math and sciences) has replaced students' reading skills to have a broader view."

== Current rankings ==
=== 2020 ===
The Better Life Index is not yet comparable over time as its methodology is still being fine-tuned. The OECD advises referring to the Hows Life - Well-being database for a view over time.

The data shown below are the current rankings per country and topic for the year 2020. Each topic is given a score calculated from the indices used to create the topic group, you can find the raw data on the OECD Better Life Index website. The rankings given below are calculated giving an equal weighting of 1 to each well-being topic.

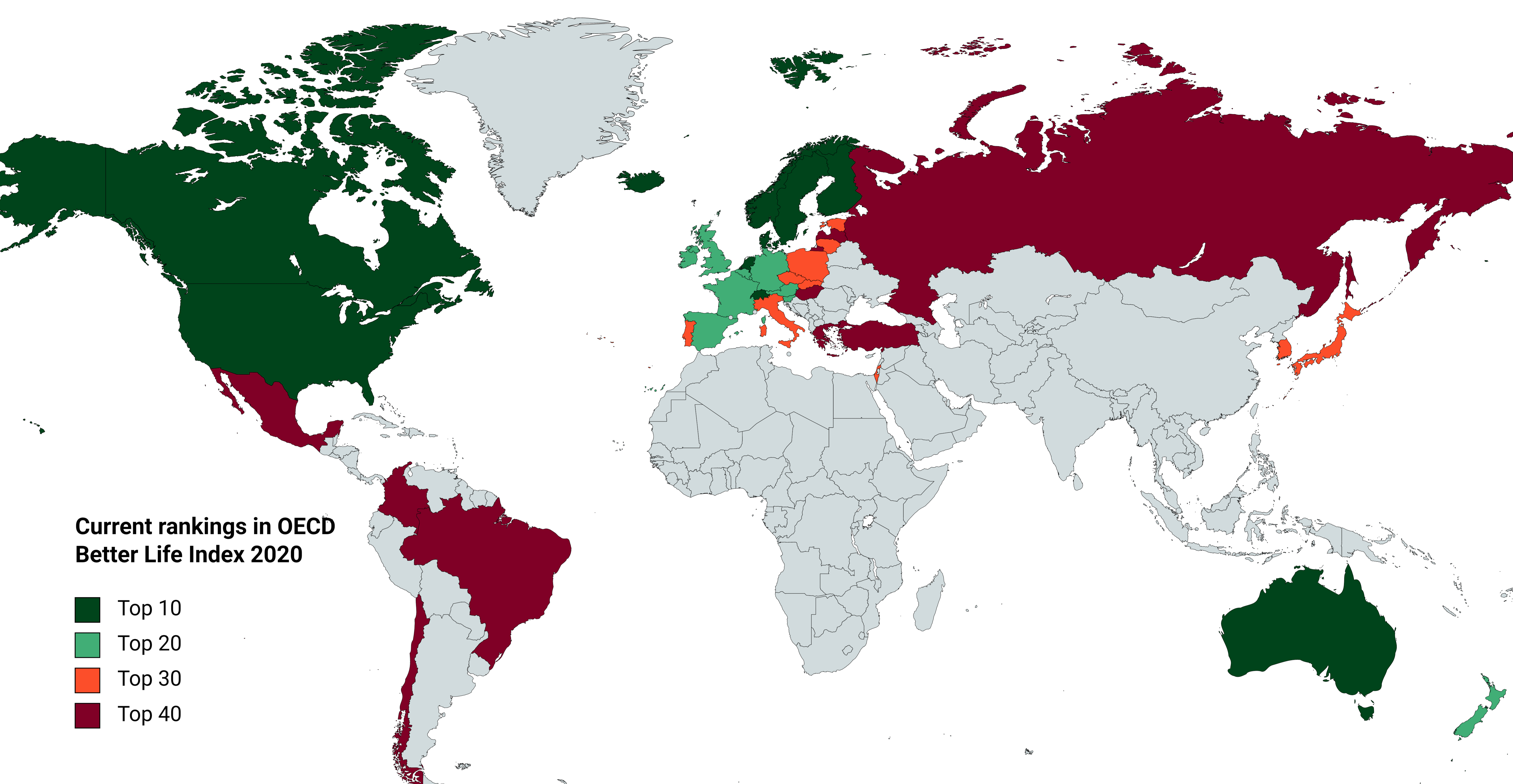
Current rankings in OECD Better Life Index (2020)

Legend:

Explained by: Housing Explained by: Income Explained by: Jobs	Explained by: Community Explained by: Education Explained by: Environment	Explained by: Civic engagement Explained by: Health Explained by: Life Satisfaction	Explained by: Safety Explained by: Work-Life Balance

Overall Rank	Country	Housing	Income and Wealth	Jobs	Community	Education	Environment	Civic engagement	Health	Life Satisfaction	Safety	Work-Life Balance
1	Norway											
2	Australia											
3	Iceland											
4	Canada											
5	Denmark											
6	Switzerland											
7	Finland											
8	Netherlands											
9	Sweden											
10	United States											
11	Luxembourg											
12	New Zealand											
13	Belgium											
14	United Kingdom											
15	Germany											
16	Ireland											
17	Austria											
18	France											
19	Spain											
20	Slovenia											
21	Estonia											
22	Czech Republic											
23	Israel											
24	Italy											
25	Japan											
26	Slovakia											
27	Poland											
28	Lithuania											
29	Portugal											
30	South Korea											
31	Hungary											
32	Latvia											
33	Russia											
34	Chile											
35	Brazil											
36	Greece											
37	Turkey											
38	Colombia											
39	Mexico											
40	South Africa											

== Findings ==
The fourth edition of How's Life was released in 2020; all reports can be viewed online using the OECD Library. Below is a summary of the most recent findings.

=== General ===
- Since 2010, life expectancy has overall increased by more than one year across OECD countries
- Over the last decade, the average homicide rate has fallen and people generally feel safer
- Income and jobs have on average risen over the last 10 years
- People are generally more satisfied with their lives than they were in 2013
- Each of the member countries is facing a very different reality however, and those countries showing improvements tend also to be those that had weaker well-being initially; they are concentrated in eastern Europe, so countries are catching up. The gap, between those improving and those that are not, has been widening, and though some countries are seeing improved well-being, this does not always come hand-in-hand with increased GDP.
- Almost 40% of households are financially insecure
- 12% of the population across the OECD live in relative income poverty
- Those reporting difficulties in making ends meet have almost doubled since 2010
- There is a worrying decline in time spent socialising, with people spending almost half an hour less a week with friends and family than in 2010 whilst 1 in 11 people say they don't have friends or family to rely on
- A significant minority of men (12%) and women (15%) report having more negative than positive feelings in a typical day and though life satisfaction has overall improved since 2010, 7% of people report very low levels of life satisfaction across the OECD countries.

=== Inequalities ===
The report highlights differences in gender, age, education and between the top and bottom performers of well-being outcomes. Income inequality has barely changed since 2010 and those in the top 20% earn 6 times more than those in the bottom 20%. Women have more social connections and earn 13% less than men whilst also working half an hour more on both paid and unpaid work per day.

Higher levels of wellbeing are seen in those countries having higher levels of equality.

== Reception ==
One major criticism is that the Better Life Index uses a limited subset of indicators used by other indicators meant to measure happiness or well-being such as Gross National Well-being Index of 2005, Sustainable Society Index of 2008, and Bhutan Gross National Happiness Index of 2012, and Social Progress Index of 2013. Observers argue that "the 11 dimensions still cannot fully capture what is truly important to a populace, such as social networks that sustain relationships, and freedom of speech." Others have criticized its methodology such as the use of relative scores instead of absolute ones.

The insights provided by user inputs into the platform have been praised to effectively depict collective citizen definitions of well-being. The initiative and index have gone some way to moving the public debate, though the platform is not well advertised and does not appear in the top results of web searches for similar tools.

== See also ==
- Broad measures of economic progress
- Disability-adjusted life year
- Economics
- Full cost accounting
- Gender-related Development Index
- Genuine progress indicator
- Global Peace Index
- Green gross domestic product
- Green national product
- Gross National Happiness
- Gross National Well-being
- Happiness economics
- Happy Planet Index
- Human Development Index
- Human Development Report
- ISEW
- Legatum Prosperity Index
- Leisure satisfaction
- Living planet index
- Millennium Development Goals
- Numbeo
- Post-materialism
- Progress (history)
- Progressive utilization theory
- Psychometrics
- Subjective life satisfaction
- Where-to-be-born Index
- Wikiprogress
- World Values Survey
