= Happy Planet Index =

Index of human well-being and environmental impact

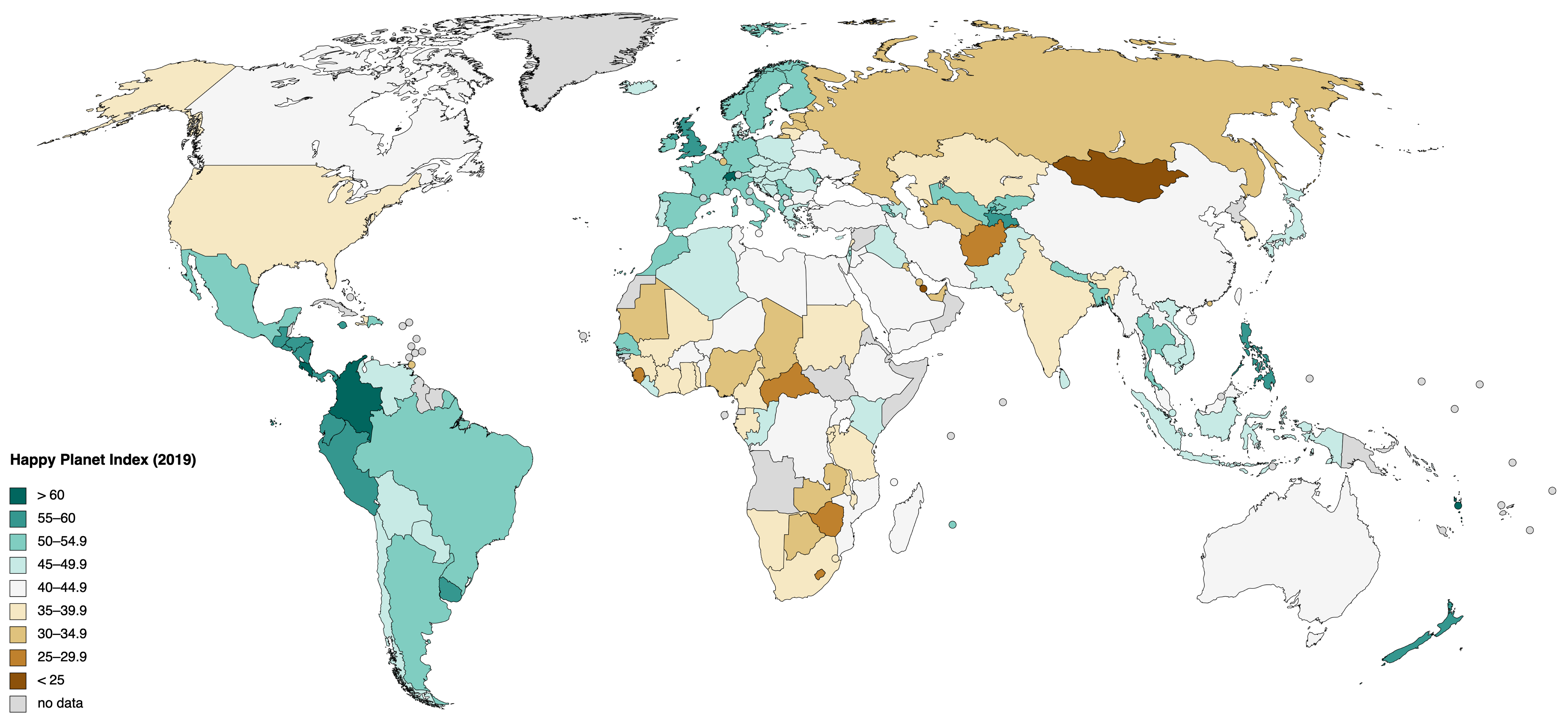
Map showing countries shaded by their score in the Happy Planet Index (2019)

The Happy Planet Index (HPI) is an index of human well-being and environmental impact that was introduced by the New Economics Foundation in 2006. Each country's HPI value is a function of its average subjective life satisfaction, life expectancy at birth, and ecological footprint per capita. The exact function is a little more complex, but conceptually it approximates multiplying life satisfaction and life expectancy and dividing that by the ecological footprint. The index is weighted to give progressively higher scores to nations with lower ecological footprints.

The index is designed to challenge well-established indices of countries' development, such as the gross domestic product (GDP) and the Human Development Index (HDI), which are seen as not taking sustainability into account. In particular, GDP is seen as inappropriate, as the usual ultimate aim of most people is not to be rich, but to be happy and healthy. Furthermore, it is believed that the notion of sustainable development requires a measure of the environmental costs of pursuing those goals.

Out of the 178 countries surveyed in 2006, the best scoring countries were Vanuatu, Colombia, Costa Rica, Dominica, and Panama. In 2009, Costa Rica was the best scoring country among the 143 analyzed, followed by the Dominican Republic, Jamaica, Guatemala and Vietnam. Tanzania, Botswana and Zimbabwe were featured at the bottom of the list.

For the 2012 ranking, 151 countries were compared, and the best scoring country for the second time in a row was Costa Rica, followed by Vietnam, Colombia, Belize and El Salvador. The lowest ranking countries in 2012 were Botswana, Chad and Qatar. In 2016, out of 140 countries, Costa Rica topped the index for the third time in a row. It was followed by Mexico, Colombia, Vanuatu and Vietnam. At the bottom were Chad, Luxembourg and Togo. The latest update was published in 2021 by the Wellbeing Economy Alliance. According to that update, the top 10 ranking countries (in 2019) were Costa Rica, Vanuatu, Colombia, Switzerland, Ecuador, Panama, Jamaica, Guatemala, Honduras and Uruguay. The 2021 update also, for the first time, highlighted trends over time, noting for example improving Happy Planet Index scores in Western Europe and in Africa, but declining scores in South Asia.

== Methodology ==
The HPI is based on general utilitarian principles – that most people want to live long and fulfilling lives, and the country which is doing the best is the one that allows its citizens to do so, whilst avoiding infringing on the opportunity of future people and people in other countries to do the same. In effect it operationalises the IUCN's (International Union for Conservation of Nature) call for a metric capable of measuring 'the production of human well-being (not necessarily material goods) per unit of extraction of or imposition upon nature'. The IUCN is an international organization working in the field of nature conservation and the sustainable use of natural resources. It measures what matters, a sustainable well-being for all.

Human well-being is conceptualized as happy life expectancy. Extraction of or imposition upon nature is evaluated by using the ecological footprint per capita, which attempts to estimate the number of natural resources required to sustain a given country's lifestyle. A country with a large per capita ecological footprint uses more than its fair share of resources, both by drawing resources from other countries and also by causing permanent damage to the planet which will affect future generations.

As such, the HPI is not a measure of which are the happiest countries in the world. Countries with relatively high levels of life satisfaction, as measured in surveys, are found from the very top (Colombia in 3rd place) to the very bottom (the US in 108th place) of the rank order. The HPI is best conceived as a measure of the environmental efficiency of supporting well-being in a given country. Such efficiency could emerge in a country with a medium environmental impact (e.g. Costa Rica) and very high well-being, but it could also emerge in a country with only mediocre well-being, but very minimal environmental impact (e.g. Vietnam).

== Criticism ==
Much criticism of the index has been due to commentators incorrectly understanding it to be a measure of personal happiness, when it is in fact a measure of the "happiness" of the planet. In other words, it is a measure of the ecological efficiency at supporting well-being. Furthermore, the Happy Planet Index was criticized because the used data is not comprehensive enough. In the HPI Report of 2006 (by nef) they emphasized that they "were forced to estimate data on Footprint and life satisfaction for several countries". Furthermore, they added that "there are obvious problems with the data from some countries, especially when it is collected and distributed by the country's government."

Aside from that, criticism has focused on the following:

- The World Values Survey covers only a minority of the world's nations and is only carried out every five years. As a result, much of the data for the index must come from other sources or is estimated using regressions.

The index has been criticized for weighting the carbon footprint too heavily, to the point that the US would have had to be universally happy and would have had to have a life expectancy of 439 years to equal Vanuatu's score in the 2006 index.

Nevertheless, the HPI and its components have been considered in political circles. The ecological footprint, championed by the WWF, is widely used by both local and national governments, as well as supranational organizations such as the European Commission. The HPI itself was cited in 2007, in the British Conservative Party as a possible substitute for GDP. A 2007 review of progress indicators produced by the European Parliament lists the following pros and cons to using the HPI as a measure of national progress:

Pros

- considers the actual 'ends' of economic activity in the form of life satisfaction and longevity
- combines well-being and environmental aspects
- simple and easily understandable scheme for calculating the index
- comparability of results ('EF' and 'life expectancy' can be applied to different countries)
- data available online, although some data gaps remain.
- mixture of 'soft' and 'hard' criteria; takes into account people's well-being and resource use of countries.

Cons

- 'happiness' or 'life satisfaction' are very subjective and personal: cultural influences and complex impact of policies on happiness.
- confusion of name: index is not a measure of happiness but rather a measure of environmental efficiency of supporting well-being in a given country.

== International rankings ==
=== 2019 ranking ===
For the 2019 ranking, 152 countries were compared and eight out of the ten top countries were located in Central and South America, despite high levels of poverty. The ranking was led by Costa Rica with an HPI score of 62.1, with its lead considered to be due to its very high life expectancy of 77 years. Citizens of Costa Rica were found to experience well-being higher than many richer nations and the country had a per capita footprint less than one third the size of the US. The second happiest country was Vanuatu. The highest ranking OECD country was Costa Rica, in 1st place, and the top country in Europe is Switzerland, in 4th place, just behind Colombia in 3rd.

== See also ==
Indices

- Broad measures of economic progress
- Disability-adjusted life year
- Economics
- Full cost accounting
- Green national product
- Green gross domestic product (Green GDP)
- Gender-related Development Index
- Genuine Progress Indicator (GPI)
- Global Peace Index
- Gross National Happiness
- Gross National Well-being (GNW)
- Happiness economics
- Human Development Index (HDI)
- Humanistic economics
- ISEW (Index of sustainable economic welfare)
- Progress (history)
- Progressive utilization theory
- Legatum Prosperity Index
- Leisure satisfaction
- Living Planet Index
- Millennium Development Goals (MDGs)
- OECD Better Life Index BLI
- Post-materialism
- Psychometrics
- Subjective life satisfaction
- Where-to-be-born Index
- Wikiprogress
- World Happiness Report (WHR)
- World Values Survey (WVS)
