= True cost accounting =

Accounting that measures the hidden impacts of economic activities on the environment

True Cost Accounting (TCA) is an accounting approach that measures and values the hidden impacts of economic activities on the environment, society and health. TCA is also referred to as full cost accounting (FCA) or "multiple capital accounting (MCA)". The approach moves beyond purely economic thinking with the aim of improving decision-making in commercial organizations and in public policy. It includes accounting for natural capital, human capital, social capital and produced capital.

The True Cost Accounting approach can be applied to every sector of the economy. It aims to reveal the impacts of economic activities on society as a whole, in addition to the private costs directly incurred by producers and consumers. These can be environmental, health or social impacts that are not reflected in the market prices of products and services, i.e. not included in the operational profit and loss accounts, and so are regarded as hidden. True Cost Accounting is of particular relevance for agrifood systems (food and non-food agricultural products), where hidden costs can be substantial. Indeed, much of the development of TCA has historically been in the context of food.

== History ==
Although True Cost Accounting is a relatively recent term, it is not a new concept. It is closely linked to the concept of externalities, costs or benefits to an uninvolved third party that arise as an effect of another party's (or parties') activity. The root of the TCA concept can be attributed to the work of Pigou and Marshall in the 1920s. Over the last decades, monetary values have been assigned to externalities where businesses are penalized, or when insurance firms calculate costs in industrial accidents. TCA is also considered to be an expansion of cost-benefit analysis (CBA). In the 1980s and the 1990s, other terms were used to convey similar concepts to that of TCA such as full cost accounting.

What sets the true cost accounting approach apart from its predecessors is that systems thinking and holistic thinking – which acknowledge that economic systems are made up of many stakeholders (such as producers, consumers, distributors and policy makers) and that these systems rely on multiple capitals (natural capital, social capital, human capital and produced capital) – are integral parts of the approach. TCA acknowledges the complex nature of economic systems with all its interdependencies. An application of TCA tends to include a dozen or more indicators selected to measure and value positive and negative impacts across the environmental, health, social and economic domains.

=== The true cost accounting approach in food and agriculture ===
Recent advancements in the true cost accounting approach have been related to food and agriculture. The Economics of Ecosystems and Biodiversity (TEEB) initiative currently hosted by the United Nations Environmental Programme, aims to mainstream the values of biodiversity and ecosystem services into decision-making. The programme has developed guidelines and several studies have been conducted on how to implement TCA and then use the results to guide policy reforms. In 2018, TEEB for Food and Agriculture (TEEBAgriFood) was launched, under Alexander Müller. The aim was to address the core theoretical issues and controversies underpinning the evaluation of the relationship between the agrifood sector, biodiversity and ecosystem services, and the impacts on human health on a global scale.

In order to research the potential of true cost accounting to transform agrifood systems towards sustainability, various other organizations and research institutions have also initiated TCA studies and reports. Examples include the World Business Council for Sustainable Development, the Global Alliance for the Future of Food, and the Sustainable Food Trust. Additionally, the Global Nature Fund and the Capital Coalition, in collaboration with TEEBAgriFood, have developed a framework for integrating TCA into business accounting to make business impacts transparent.

== Definitions ==
The definition of True Cost Accounting is evolving, with many proposed definitions.

=== United Nations Environmental Programme ===
The United Nations Environmental Programme defines it as "an evolving holistic and systemic approach to measure and value the positive and negative environmental, social, health and economic costs and benefits to facilitate policy, business, farmer, investor and consumer decisions."

=== True Cost Initiative ===
The True Cost Initiative proposes a similar definition but uses the term "methodology" instead of "approach". However, TEEBAgrifood presents TCA as an approach under which various methodologies and analytical tools can be used. In addition, the definition proposed by the True Cost Initiative confines the use of TCA to externalities while FAO suggests that externalities constitute only part of the hidden costs, while other hidden costs might be driven by other market failures such as poor and asymmetric information. Some use the term "full cost accounting (FCA)" to refer to the same idea. This is the case of IFOAM (Organics International & Sustainable Organic Agriculture Action Network), which defines FCA in a similar way to the TCA definition of UNEP.

=== TEEBAgriFood Evaluation Framework ===
In some publications, such as TEEBAgriFood Evaluation Framework, the term "multiple capital accounting (MCA)" is used to refer to TCA. For example, MCA is defined as "an approach to systems thinking, which includes natural, human, social and produced capitals" and "enables you to articulate and explore the visible and invisible connections that agrifood systems have with humans and the environment".

=== Food and Agriculture Organization ===
In 2023, the Food and Agriculture Organization defined TCA as "a holistic and systemic approach to measuring and valuing the environmental, social, health and economic costs and benefits generated by agrifood systems in order to improve decisions by policymakers, businesses, farmers, investors and consumers." This definition is very similar to the one proposed by UNEP, the words "holistic and systemic" mean that TCA studies full systems, accounting for all types of capitals and stakeholders and their interconnectedness. In addition, this definition of TCA considers both "costs and benefits" and should value all impacts making them visible whether they are the environmental, social, health or economic.

== Capitals ==
One of the constraints to measuring some of the capitals is that capital flows can be qualitative in nature. FAO illustrates the ease of quantification of the four capitals and their flows for TCAs on agrifood systems along a spectrum.

Economic activities depend on – as well as affect – natural, human, social and produced capitals, which form the foundation of human well-being, economic success and environmental sustainability. Little has been done to measure most of the capitals with the exception of produced capital and part of human capital, therefore the TCA approach aims to measure the hidden costs associated with these capitals.

Data that are commonly included in economic assessments relate to the flows and impacts of produced capital (that is composed of machinery, equipment, infrastructure, produce etc) and, to some extent, human capital (for example, labour and wages), which are observed, measured and quantified in the market.

Flows and impacts related to natural, social and (part of) human capital, in contrast, are not, so their inclusion in economic assessments is largely partial and not systematic.

=== Natural capital ===
Natural capital provides biomass growth and freshwater to economic activities, which, in return, can negatively affect natural capital with GHG emissions and pollution. In contrast, certain production practices can contribute to ecosystem restoration, and this is the case of regenerative agriculture and agroecology.

=== Human capital ===
Human capital provides skills and labour and receives wages and working conditions that might be good or bad.

=== Social capital ===
Social capital contributes to economic activities through cultural knowledge and shapes customs of access to resources such as land, while economic activities can lead to social well-being or social marginalization and poverty.

=== Produced capital ===
Produced capital contributes research and development, while generating income, profits, rent and taxes in return.

== Results ==
Most true cost accounting studies try to reveal hidden costs relate to the field of food and agriculture. The scope of these studies differs depending on the research question being addressed, the geographical coverage and the hidden impacts to be included in the analysis. There are many hidden impacts and some are difficult to measure or quantify. For example, environmental externalities such GHG emissions are easy to include in any TCA analysis due to a wide availability of relevant data. However, the hidden impacts related to human and social capitals might be more difficult to find. Examples include impacts on working conditions (human capital) and cultural identity (social capital).

=== Hidden costs of global agrifood systems ===

In 2019, a study by the World Bank estimated the hidden costs of foodborne diseases (from unsafe food) in low and middle-income countries and found these to amount to USD 95.2 billion.

Three other studies have attempted to estimate the hidden costs of global agrifood systems. FOLU (2019) estimated them at USD 12 trillion, while Hendricks et al (2023) estimated them at USD 19 trillion. However, the latter, acknowledges the uncertainly in the estimate and concludes that the value would be between USD 7.2 trillion and USD 51.8 trillion. The third estimate in the 2023 edition of the FAO report: The State of Food and Agriculture estimates global hidden costs from agrifood systems to be USD 12.7 trillion. This study also acknowledges the uncertainty in the estimate. The FAO report shows the global value of the hidden costs has a 95 percent chance of being at least USD 10.8 trillion and a 5 percent chance of being at least USD 16 trillion. Differently from the other two studies, the FAO report assesses hidden costs of agrifood systems at the national level for 154 countries. It states these national numbers are consistent and comparable covering the major dimensions (i.e. environmental, health and social) of agrifood system hidden costs, allowing not only comparison across countries, but also across the different dimensions.

=== Hidden costs of national agrifood systems ===
A study based in the United States reported nearly $2 trillion in hidden health and environmental expenditure, which disproportionately burdens communities of color.

=== Hidden costs of specific food products ===
In 2018, a TEEBAgriFood study on organic rice production in Thailand measured and made visible its hidden costs and benefits of rice production in Thailand and identified options for stimulating sustainable rice production in the long term. Another study compared the external costs associated with genetically modified and organic corn production in Minnesota, USA.

=== Hidden costs of diets ===
Diets low in whole grains and fruits and high in sodium are the leading dietary risks contributing to global health hidden costs

Following up on the 2023 edition of the FAO report – The State of Food and Agriculture – the subsequent edition provides a detailed breakdown of the hidden costs associated with unhealthy dietary patterns that lead to non-communicable diseases for 156 countries. The report finds that in 2020, global health hidden costs amounted 8.1 trillion 2020 PPP dollars, 70 percent of all of the hidden costs of agrifood systems. Diets low in whole grains are the leading concern (18 percent of global quantified health hidden costs), alongside diets high in sodium and low in fruits (16 percent each), although there is significant variation across countries.

The 2020 FAO report – The State of Food Security and Nutrition in the World - estimated health and climate change hidden costs, driven by current dietary patterns that were estimated using food availability from FAO Food Balance Sheets and adjusted for food waste. The current dietary patterns assumed that a person's energy intake averaged 2,300 kcal per person per day. It finds that if current dietary patterns were to continue until 2030, these hidden costs would exceed USD 1.3 trillion for health and USD 1.7 trillion for climate change, annually.

A study conducted by Tufts University in the United States reviewed the health equity and economic benefits of medically tailored meals (MTMs) and produce prescription programs. It found that implementing MTMs in Medicare, Medicaid, and private insurance for patients experiencing both a diet-related condition and limited ability to perform activities of daily living could avert approximately 1.6 million hospitalizations and save approximately $13.6 billion in health care costs in the first implementation year.

== See also ==
- Social cost, the sum of private costs and externalities
- Triple bottom line, an accounting framework considering social, environmental and economic impacts

== Sources ==
This article incorporates text from a free content work. Licensed under CC BY-SA IGO 3.0 (license statement/permission). Text taken from In Brief to The State of Food and Agriculture 2023, FAO, FAO.

This article incorporates text from a free content work. Licensed under CC BY 4.0 (license statement/permission). Text taken from In Brief to The State of Food and Agriculture 2024, FAO, FAO.
