= Gross National Well-being =

Socioeconomic development and measurement framework

Gross National Well-being (GNW), also known as Gross National Wellness, is a socioeconomic development and measurement framework. The GNW Index consists of seven dimensions: economic, environmental, physical, mental, work, social, and political. Most wellness areas include both subjective results (via survey) and objective data.

The GNW Index is also known as the first Gross National Happiness Index, not to be confused with Bhutan's GNH Index. Both econometric frameworks are different in authorship, creation dates, and geographic scope. The GNW / GNH Index is a global development measurement framework published in 2005 by the International Institute of Management in the United States.

== History ==
The term "Gross National Happiness" was first coined by the Bhuntanese King Jigme Singye Wangchuck in 1972. However, no GNH Index existed until 2005.

The GNH philosophy suggested that the ideal purpose of governments is to promote happiness. The philosophy remained difficult to implement due to the subjective nature of happiness, the lack of exact quantitative definition of GNH, and the lack of a practical model to measure the impact of economic policies on the subjective well-being of the citizens.

The GNW Index paper proposed the first GNH Index as a solution to help with the implementation of the GHN philosophy and was designed to transform the first generation abstract subjective political mission statement into a second generation implementation holistic (objective and subjective) concept and by treating happiness as a socioeconomic development metric that would provide an alternative to the traditional GDP indicator, the new metric would integrate subjective and objective socioeconomic development policy framework and measurement indicators.

In 2006, a policy white paper providing recommendations for implementing the GNW Index metric was published by the International Institute of Management. The paper is widely referenced by academic and policy maker citing the GNW / GNH index as a potential model for local socioeconomic development and measurement.

== Disambiguation ==
The GNW Index is a secular econometric model that tracks 7 subjective and objective development areas with no religious measurement components. On the other hand, Bhutan's GNH Index is a local development framework and measurement index, published by the Centre for Bhutan Studies in 2012 based on 2011 Index function designed by Alkire-Foster at Oxford University. The Bhutan's GNH Index is customized to the country's Buddhist cultural and spiritual values, it tracks 9 subjective happiness areas including spiritual measurement such as prayers recitation and other Karma indicators. The concepts and issues at the heart of Bhutanese approach are similar to the secular GNH Index.

== Survey components ==
The subjective survey part of the GNW measurement system is structured into seven areas or dimensions. Each area or dimension satisfaction rating is scaled from 0–10: 0 being very dissatisfied, 5 being neutral, and 10 is very satisfied.

1. Mental & Emotional Wellbeing Overall Satisfaction (0–10):
  Frequency and levels of positive vs. negative thoughts and feelings over the past year
2. Physical & Health Wellbeing Overall Satisfaction (0–10):
  Physical safety and health, including risk to life, body and property and the cost and quality of healthcare, if one gets sick
3. Work & Income Wellbeing Overall Satisfaction (0–10):
  Job and income to support essential living expenses, including shelter, food, transportation, and education. If a head of household, the expenses to support household/family is included
4. Social Relations Wellbeing Overall Satisfaction (0–10):
  Relations with the significant other, family, friends, colleagues, neighbors, and community
5. Economic & Retirement Wellbeing Overall Satisfaction (0–10):
  Disposable (extra) income, which is the remaining money after paying for essential living expenses. This money can be used for leisure activities, retirement savings, investments, or charity.
6. Political & Government Wellbeing Overall Satisfaction (0–10):
  Political rights, privacy and personal freedom as well the performance of the government (including socioeconomic development policies effectiveness and efficiency)
7. Living Environment Wellbeing Overall Satisfaction (0–10):
  City/urban planning, utilities, infrastructure, traffic, architecture, landscaping and nature's pollution (including noise, air, water, and soil)

The survey also asks four qualitative questions to identify key causes of happiness and unhappiness:

1. What are the top positive things in your life that make you happy?
2. What are the top challenges and causes of stress in your life?
3. What would you advise your government to increase your well-being and happiness?
4. What are the most influential city, state, federal or international projects? How are they impacting your well-being and happiness (positively or negatively)?
