= Sustainability measurement =

Quantitbasis for the informed management of sustainability

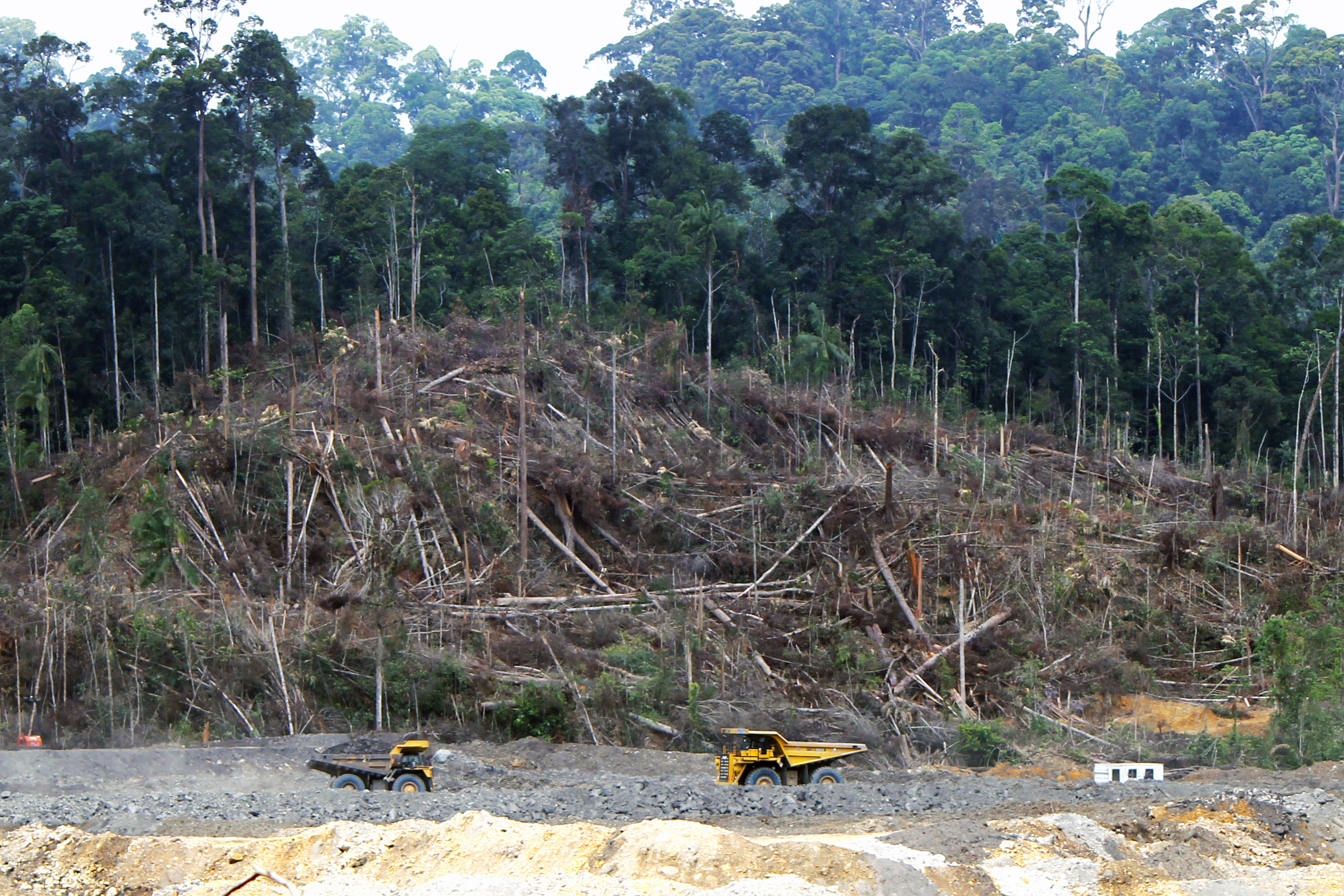
Trees being felled in Kalimantan, the Indonesian part of Borneo, in 2013, to make way for a new coal mining project.

Sustainability measurement is a set of frameworks or indicators used to measure how sustainable something is. This includes processes, products, services and businesses. Sustainability is difficult to quantify and it may even be impossible to measure as there is no fixed definition. To measure sustainability, frameworks and indicators consider environmental, social and economic domains. The metrics vary by use case and are still evolving. They include indicators, benchmarks and audits. They include sustainability standards and certification systems like Fairtrade and Organic. They also involve indices and accounting. They can include assessment, appraisal and other reporting systems. The metrics are used over a wide range of spatial and temporal scales.

For organizations, sustainability measures include corporate sustainability reporting and Triple Bottom Line accounting. For countries, they include estimates of the quality of sustainability governance or quality of life measures, or environmental assessments like the Environmental Sustainability Index and Environmental Performance Index. Some methods let us track sustainable development. These include the UN Human Development Index, ecological footprints, and the Nature Relationship Index.

Two related concepts for sustainability measurement are planetary boundaries and ecological footprint. If the boundaries are not crossed and the ecological footprint does not exceed the carrying capacity of the biosphere, the mode of life can be regarded as sustainable.

A set of well defined and harmonized indicators can help to make sustainability tangible. Those indicators are expected to be identified and adjusted through empirical observations (trial and error). The most common critiques are related to issues like data quality, comparability, objective function and the necessary resources. However a more general criticism is coming from the project management community: "How can a sustainable development be achieved at global level if we cannot monitor it in any single project?".

== Sustainability need and framework ==
Sustainable development has become the primary yardstick of improvement for industries and is being integrated into effective government and business strategies. The needs for sustainability measurement include improvement in the operations, benchmarking performances, tracking progress, and evaluating process, among others. For the purposes of building sustainability indicators, frameworks can be developed and the steps are as follows:

1. Defining the system- A proper and definite system is defined. A proper system boundary is drawn for further analysis.
2. Elements of the system- The whole input, output of materials, emissions, energy and other auxiliary elements are properly analysed. The working conditions, process parameters and characteristics are defined in this step.
3. Indicators selection- The indicators is selected of which measurement has to be done. This forms the metric for this system whose analysis is done in the further steps.
4. Assessment and Measurement- Proper assessing tools are used and tests or experiments are performed for the pre-defined indicators to give a value for the indicators measurement.
5. Analysis and reviewing the results- Once the results have been obtained, proper analysis and interpretation is done and tools are used to improve and revise the processes present in the system.

== Sustainability indicators and their function ==
The principal objective of sustainability indicators is to inform public policy-making as part of the process of sustainability governance. Sustainability indicators can provide information on any aspect of the interplay between the environment and socio-economic activities. Building strategic indicator sets generally deals with just a few simple questions: what is happening? (descriptive indicators), does it matter and are we reaching targets? (performance indicators), are we improving? (efficiency indicators), are measures working? (policy effectiveness indicators), and are we generally better off? (total welfare indicators).

The International Institute for Sustainable Development and the United Nations Conference on Trade and Development established the Committee on Sustainability Assessment (COSA) in 2006 to evaluate sustainability initiatives operating in agriculture and develop indicators for their measurable social, economic and environmental objectives.

One popular general framework used by The European Environment Agency uses a slight modification of the Organisation for Economic Co-operation and Development DPSIR system. This breaks up environmental impact into five stages. Social and economic developments (consumption and production) (D)rive or initiate environmental (P)ressures which, in turn, produces a change in the (S)tate of the environment which leads to (I)mpacts of various kinds. Societal (R)esponses (policy guided by sustainability indicators) can be introduced at any stage of this sequence of events.

A 2024 study introduced a Spatial Cooperative Simulation (SCS). Framework that models the co-evolution of land use, population, and economic land data to better predict and plan for sustainable regional development. This framework demonstrated improved accuracy in predicting sustainable urban development for China's Greater Bay Area.

=== Politics ===
A study concluded that social indicators and, therefore, sustainable development indicators, are scientific constructs whose principal objective is to inform public policy-making. The International Institute for Sustainable Development has similarly developed a political policy framework, linked to a sustainability index for establishing measurable entities and metrics. The framework consists of six core areas:

1. International trade and investment
2. Economic policy
3. Climate change and energy
4. Measurement and assessment
5. Natural resource management
6. Communication technologies.

The United Nations Global Compact Cities Programme has defined sustainable political development in a way that broadens the usual definition beyond states and governance. The political is defined as the domain of practices and meanings associated with basic issues of social power as they pertain to the organisation, authorisation, legitimation and regulation of a social life held in common. This definition is in accord with the view that political change is important for responding to economic, ecological and cultural challenges. It also means that the politics of economic change can be addressed. They have listed seven subdomains of the domain of politics:

1. Organization and governance
2. Law and justice
3. Communication and critique
4. Representation and negotiation
5. Security and accord
6. Dialogue and reconciliation
7. Ethics and accountability

== Metrics at the global scale ==
There are numerous indicators which could be used as basis for sustainability measurement. Few commonly used indicators are:

Environmental sustainability indicators:

- Global warming potential
- Acidification potential
- Ozone depletion potential
- Aerosol optical depth
- Eutrophication potential
- Ionization radiation potential
- Photochemical ozone potential
- Waste treatment
- Freshwater use
- Energy resources use
- Level of Biodiversity

Economic indicators:

- Gross domestic product
- Trade balance
- Local government income
- Profit, value and tax
- Investments

Social indicators:

- Employment generated
- Equity
- Health and safety
- Education
- Housing/living conditions
- Community cohesion
- Social security

Due to the large numbers of various indicators that could be used for sustainability measurement, proper assessment and monitoring is required. In order to organize the chaos and disorder in selecting the metrics, specific organizations have been set up which groups the metrics under different categories and defines proper methodology to implement it for measurement. They provide modelling techniques and indexes to compare the measurement and have methods to convert the scientific measurement results into easy to understand terms.

=== United Nations indicators ===
The United Nations has developed extensive sustainability measurement tools in relation to sustainable development as well as a System of Integrated Environmental and Economic Accounting.

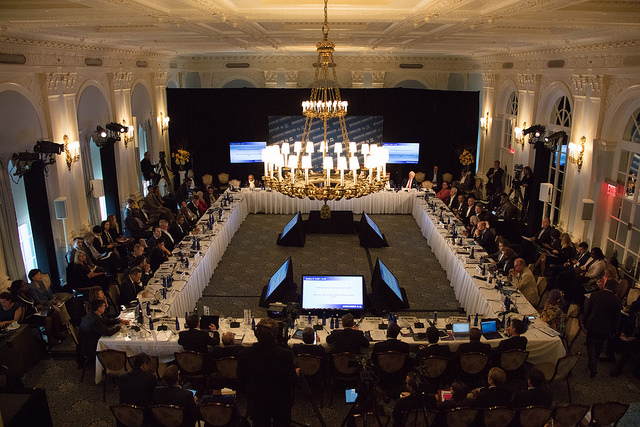
United Nations Commission on Sustainable Development.

The UN Commission on Sustainable Development (CSD) has published a list of 140 indicators which covers environmental, social, economical and institutional aspects of sustainable development.

=== Benchmarks, indicators, indexes, auditing etc. ===
In the last couple of decades, there has arisen a crowded toolbox of quantitative methods used to assess sustainability — including measures of resource use like life cycle assessment, measures of consumption like the ecological footprint and measurements of quality of environmental governance like the Environmental Performance Index. The following is a list of quantitative "tools" used by sustainability scientists - the different categories are for convenience only as defining criteria will intergrade. It would be too difficult to list all those methods available at different levels of the organization so those listed here are at the global level only.

- Benchmarks

A benchmark is a point of reference for a measurement. Once a benchmark is established it is possible to assess trends and measure progress. Baseline global data on a range of sustainability parameters is available in the list of global sustainability statistics.

- Indices

A sustainability index is an aggregate sustainability indicator that combines multiple sources of data. There is a Consultative Group on Sustainable Development Indices

Air quality index
Child Development Index
Corruption Perceptions Index
Democracy Index
Environmental Performance Index
Energy Sustainability Index
Education Index
Environmental Sustainability Index
Environmental Vulnerability Index

GDP per capita
Gini coefficient
Gender Parity Index
Gender-related Development Index
Gender Empowerment Measure
Gross national happiness
Genuine Progress Indicator

(formerly Index of Sustainable Economic Welfare)

Green Score City Index
Gross National Product

Happy Planet Index
Human Development Index (see List of countries by HDI)
Legatum Prosperity Index
Index of Sustainable Economic Welfare
Life Expectancy Index
Sustainable Governance Indicators. The Status Index ranks 30 OECD countries in terms of sustainable reform performance
Sustainable Society Index
SDEWES Index
Water Poverty Index

- Metrics

Many environmental problems ultimately relate to the human effect on those global biogeochemical cycles that are critical to life. Over the last decade monitoring these cycles have become a more urgent target for research:

- water cycle
- carbon cycle
- phosphorus cycle

- nitrogen cycle
- sulphur cycle
- oxygen cycle

- Auditing

Sustainability auditing and reporting are used to evaluate the sustainability performance of a company, organization, or other entity using various performance indicators. Popular auditing procedures available at the global level include:

- ISO 14000
- ISO 14031
- The Natural Step
- Triple Bottom Line Accounting
- input-output analysis can be used for any level of organization with a financial budget. It relates environmental impact to expenditure by calculating the resource intensity of goods and services.

- Reporting
  - Global Reporting Initiative modelling and monitoring procedures. Many of these are currently in their developing phase.
  - State of the Environment reporting provides general background information on the environment and is progressively including more indicators.
  - European sustainability
- Accounting

Some accounting methods attempt to include environmental costs rather than treating them as externalities
- Green accounting
- Sustainable value
- Sustainability economics

==== Life cycle analysis ====
A life cycle analysis is often conducted when assessing the sustainability of a product or prototype. The decision to choose materials is heavily weighted on its longevity, renewability, and efficiency. These factors ensure that researchers are conscious of community values that align with positive environmental, social, and economic impacts.

=== Resource metrics ===
Part of this process can relate to resource use such as energy accounting or to economic metrics or price system values as compared to non-market economics potential, for understanding resource use.

An important task for resource theory (energy economics) is to develop methods to optimize resource conversion processes. These systems are described and analyzed by means of the methods of mathematics and the natural sciences. Human factors, however, have dominated the development of our perspective of the relationship between nature and society since at least the Industrial Revolution, and in particular, have influenced how we describe and measure the economic impacts of changes in resource quality. A balanced view of these issues requires an understanding of the physical framework in which all human ideas, institutions, and aspirations must operate.

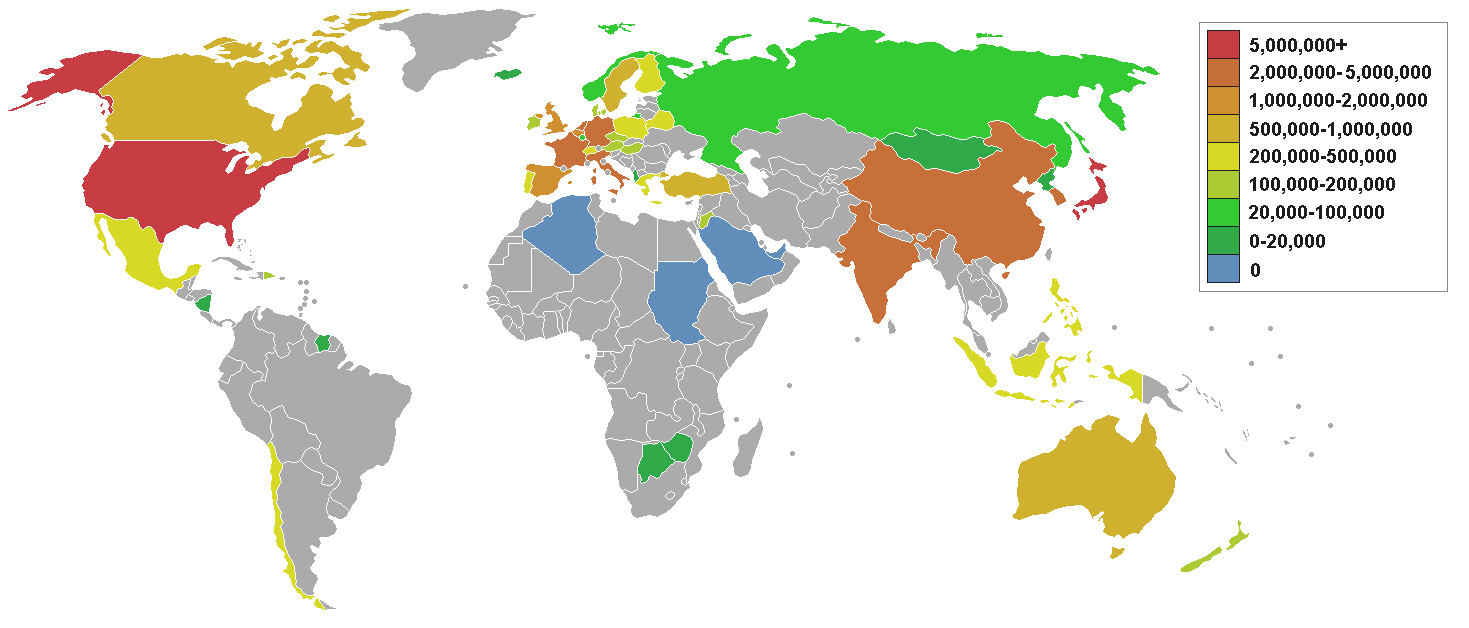
Oil imports by country

=== Energy returned on energy invested ===
When oil production first began in the mid-nineteenth century, the largest oil fields recovered fifty barrels of oil for every barrel used in the extraction, transportation, and refining. This ratio is often referred to as the Energy Return on Energy Investment (EROI or EROEI). Currently, between one and five barrels of oil are recovered for each barrel-equivalent of energy used in the recovery process. As the EROEI drops to one, or equivalently the net energy gain falls to zero, the oil production is no longer a net energy source. This happens long before the resource is physically exhausted.

Note that it is important to understand the distinction between a barrel of oil, which is a measure of oil, and a barrel of oil equivalent (BOE), which is a measure of energy. Many sources of energy, such as fission, solar, wind, and coal, are not subject to the same near-term supply restrictions that oil is. Accordingly, even an oil source with an EROEI of 0.5 can be usefully exploited if the energy required to produce that oil comes from a cheap and plentiful energy source. Availability of cheap, but hard to transport, natural gas in some oil fields has led to using natural gas to fuel enhanced oil recovery. Similarly, natural gas in huge amounts is used to power most Athabasca Tar Sands plants. Cheap natural gas has also led to ethanol fuel produced with a net EROEI of less than 1, although figures in this area are controversial because methods to measure EROEI are in debate.

=== Growth-based economic models ===
Insofar as economic growth is driven by oil consumption growth, post-peak societies must adapt. M. King Hubbert believed:

Our principal constraints are cultural. During the last two centuries we have known nothing but exponential growth and in parallel we have evolved what amounts to an exponential-growth culture, a culture so heavily dependent upon the continuance of exponential growth for its stability that it is incapable of reckoning with problems of nongrowth.

Some economists describe the problem as uneconomic growth or a false economy. At the political right, Fred Ikle has warned about "conservatives addicted to the Utopia of Perpetual Growth". Brief oil interruptions in 1973 and 1979 markedly slowed – but did not stop – the growth of world GDP.

Between 1950 and 1984, as the Green Revolution transformed agriculture around the globe, world grain production increased by 250%. The energy for the Green Revolution was provided by fossil fuels in the form of fertilizers (natural gas), pesticides (oil), and hydrocarbon fueled irrigation.

David Pimentel, professor of ecology and agriculture at Cornell University, and Mario Giampietro, senior researcher at the National Research Institute on Food and Nutrition (INRAN), place in their study Food, Land, Population and the U.S. Economy the maximum U.S. population for a sustainable economy at 200 million. To achieve a sustainable economy world population will have to be reduced by two-thirds, says the study. Without population reduction, this study predicts an agricultural crisis beginning in 2020, becoming critical c. 2050. The peaking of global oil along with the decline in regional natural gas production may precipitate this agricultural crisis sooner than generally expected. Dale Allen Pfeiffer claims that coming decades could see spiraling food prices without relief and massive starvation on a global level such as never experienced before.

=== Hubbert peaks ===
Hubbert Peak vs Oil Production

There is an active debate about most suitable sustainability indicator's use and by adopting a thermodynamic approach through the concept of "exergy" and Hubbert peaks, it is possible to incorporate all into a single measure of resource depletion.The exergy analysis of minerals could constitute a universal and transparent tool for the management of the earth's physical stock.

Hubbert peak can be used as a metric for sustainability and depletion of non-renewable resources. It can be used as reference for many metrics for non-renewable resources such as:

1. Stagnating supplies
2. Rising prices
3. Individual country peaks
4. Decreasing discoveries
5. Finding and development costs
6. Spare capacity
7. Export capabilities of producing countries
8. System inertia and timing
9. Reserves-to-production ratio
10. Past history of depletion and optimism

Although Hubbert peak theory receives most attention in relation to peak oil production, it has also been applied to other natural resources.

=== Natural gas ===
Doug Reynolds predicted in 2005 that the North American peak would occur in 2007. Bentley (p. 189) predicted a world "decline in conventional gas production from about 2020".

=== Coal ===
Peak coal is significantly further out than peak oil, but we can observe the example of anthracite in the US, a high grade coal whose production peaked in the 1920s. Anthracite was studied by Hubbert, and matches a curve closely. Pennsylvania's coal production also matches Hubbert's curve closely, but this does not mean that coal in Pennsylvania is exhausted—far from it. If production in Pennsylvania returned at its all-time high, there are reserves for 190 years. Hubbert had recoverable coal reserves worldwide at 2500 billion metric tons and peaking around 2150 (depending on usage).

More recent estimates suggest an earlier peak. Coal: Resources and Future Production (PDF 630KB), published on April 5, 2007 by the Energy Watch Group (EWG), which reports to the German Parliament, found that global coal production could peak in as few as 15 years. Reporting on this Richard Heinberg also notes that the date of peak annual energetic extraction from coal will likely come earlier than the date of peak in quantity of coal (tons per year) extracted as the most energy-dense types of coal have been mined most extensively. A second study, The Future of Coal by B. Kavalov and S. D. Peteves of the Institute for Energy (IFE), prepared for European Commission Joint Research Centre, reaches similar conclusions and states that "coal might not be so abundant, widely available and reliable as an energy source in the future".

Work by David Rutledge of Caltech predicts that the total of world coal production will amount to only about 450 gigatonnes. This implies that coal is running out faster than usually assumed.

Finally, insofar as global peak oil and peak in natural gas are expected anywhere from imminently to within decades at most, any increase in coal production (mining) per annum to compensate for declines in oil or NG production, would necessarily translate to an earlier date of peak as compared with peak coal under a scenario in which annual production remains constant.

=== Fissionable materials ===
In a paper in 1956, after a review of US fissionable reserves, Hubbert notes of nuclear power:

There is promise, however, provided mankind can solve its international problems and not destroy itself with nuclear weapons, and provided world population (which is now expanding at such a rate as to double in less than a century) can somehow be brought under control, that we may at last have found an energy supply adequate for our needs for at least the next few centuries of the "foreseeable future."

Technologies such as the thorium fuel cycle, reprocessing and fast breeders can, in theory, considerably extend the life of uranium reserves. Roscoe Bartlett claims

Our current throwaway nuclear cycle uses up the world reserve of low-cost uranium in about 20 years.

Caltech physics professor David Goodstein has stated that

... you would have to build 10,000 of the largest power plants that are feasible by engineering standards in order to replace the 10 terawatts of fossil fuel we're burning today ... that's a staggering amount and if you did that, the known reserves of uranium would last for 10 to 20 years at that burn rate. So, it's at best a bridging technology ... You can use the rest of the uranium to breed plutonium 239 then we'd have at least 100 times as much fuel to use. But that means you're making plutonium, which is an extremely dangerous thing to do in the dangerous world that we live in.

=== Metals ===
Hubbert applied his theory to "rock containing an abnormally high concentration of a given metal" and reasoned that the peak production for metals such as copper, tin, lead, zinc and others would occur in the time frame of decades and iron in the time frame of two centuries like coal. The price of copper rose 500% between 2003 and 2007 was by some attributed to peak copper. Copper prices later fell, along with many other commodities and stock prices, as demand shrank from fear of a global recession. Lithium availability is a concern for a fleet of Li-ion battery using cars but a paper published in 1996 estimated that world reserves are adequate for at least 50 years. A similar prediction for platinum use in fuel cells notes that the metal could be easily recycled.

=== Phosphorus ===
Phosphorus supplies are essential to farming and depletion of reserves is estimated at somewhere from 60 to 130 years. Individual countries supplies vary widely; without a recycling initiative America's supply is estimated around 30 years. Phosphorus supplies affect total agricultural output which in turn limits alternative fuels such as biodiesel and ethanol.

=== Peak water ===
Hubbert's original analysis did not apply to renewable resources. However over-exploitation often results in a Hubbert peak nonetheless. A modified Hubbert curve applies to any resource that can be harvested faster than it can be replaced.

For example, a reserve such as the Ogallala Aquifer can be mined at a rate that far exceeds replenishment. This turns much of the world's underground water and lakes into finite resources with peak usage debates similar to oil. These debates usually center around agriculture and suburban water usage but generation of electricity from nuclear energy or coal and tar sands mining mentioned above is also water resource intensive. The term fossil water is sometimes used to describe aquifers whose water is not being recharged.

=== Renewable resources ===
- Fisheries: At least one researcher has attempted to perform Hubbert linearization (Hubbert curve) on the whaling industry, as well as charting the transparently dependent price of caviar on sturgeon depletion. Another example is the cod of the North Sea. The comparison of the cases of fisheries and of mineral extraction tells us that the human pressure on the environment is causing a wide range of resources to go through a depletion cycle which follows a Hubbert curve.

== Sustainability gaps ==
Sustainability measurements and indicators are part of an ever-evolving and changing process and has various gaps to be filled to achieve an integrated framework and model. The following are some of the breaks in continuity:

- Global indicators- Due to differences in social, economical, and environmental conditions of countries, each country has its own indicators and indexes to measure sustainability, which can lead to improper and varying interpretation at the global level. Hence, there common indexes and measuring parameters would allow comparisons among countries. In agriculture, comparable indicators are already in use. Coffee and cocoa studies in twelve countries using common indicators are among the first to report insights from comparing across countries.
- Policymaking- After the indicators are defined and analysis is done for the measurements from the indicators, proper policymaking methodology can be set up to improve the results achieved. Policymaking would implement changes in the particular inventory list used for measuring, which could lead to better results.
- Development of individual indicators- Value-based indicators can be developed to measure the efforts by every human being part of the ecosystem. This can affect policymaking, as policy is most effective when there is public participation.
- Data collection- Due to a number of factors including inappropriate methodology applied to data collection, dynamics of change in data, lack of adequate time and improper framework in analysis of data, measurements can quickly become outdated, inaccurate, and unpresentable. Data collections built up from the grass-roots level allow context-appropriate frameworks and regulations associated with it. A hierarchy of data collection starts from local zones to state level, to national level and finally contributing to the global level measurements. Data collected can be made easy to understand so that it could be correctly interpreted and presented through graphs, charts, and analysis bars.
- Integration across academic disciplines- Sustainability involves the whole ecosystem and is intended to have a holistic approach. For this purpose measurements intend to involve data and knowledge from all academic backgrounds. Moreover, these disciplines and insights are intended to align with the societal actions.

== See also ==
- Balanced scorecard
- Carbon accounting
- Corporate social responsibility
- Embodied energy
- Environmental audits
- Glossary of environmental science
- Green accounting
- Helix of sustainability
- List of sustainability topics
- Outline of sustainability
- Social accounting
- Sustainability science
- Sustainable Value (2008 book)
