= Outline of sustainability =

Overview of and topical guide to sustainability

Venn diagram of sustainable development:
at the confluence of three constituent parts

The following outline is provided as an overview of and topical guide to sustainability:

Sustainability – capacity to endure. For humans, sustainability is the long-term maintenance of well being, which has environmental, economic, and social dimensions, and encompasses the concept of stewardship and responsible resource management.

== Essence of sustainability ==
- Environmentalism
- Environmental ethics
- Planetary boundaries
- Sustainable development
- Sustainability science
- Sustainability accounting
- Sustainability governance
- Sustainability education

== Taxonomy ==
Sustainability is divided into two main branches: sustainability science and sustainability governance. Each of these branches is divided into a number of subfields:

=== Sub-fields of sustainability science ===
- Environmental impact assessment
- Environmental psychology
- Environmental philosophy
- Environmental law
- Sustainability measurement

=== Sub-fields of sustainability governance ===
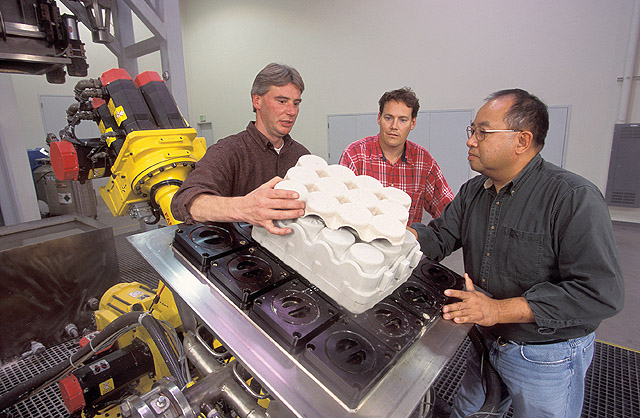
Sustainable packaging – molded pulp uses recycled newsprint to form package components. Here, researchers are molding packaging from straw.

- Economic sector:
  - Circular economy
  - Environmental impact of aviation
  - Green infrastructure
  - Steady-state economy
  - Sustainable art
  - Sustainable advertising
  - Sustainable architecture
    - New Classical Architecture
  - Sustainable business
  - Sustainable fashion
  - Sustainable industries
    - Hannover Principles
  - Sustainable landscape architecture
  - Sustainable packaging
  - Sustainable procurement
  - Sustainable tourism
  - Sustainable transport
- Political
- Organizational
  - Fisheries management
  - Sustainable forest management
  - Sustainable city
    - New Urbanism
    - Eco-cities
    - Sustainable urban infrastructure
    - Sustainable urban drainage systems
    - Sustainable urban planning
    - Sustainable urbanism
  - Sustainable community
    - Sustainable Communities Plan
  - Sustainability reporting
  - Urban reforestation
  - Urban forest
  - Urban forestry
  - Urban green space
  - Urban vitality
- Activity
  - Sustainable design
  - Sustainable living
  - Sustainable yield

=== Related disciplines ===
- Conservation biology
- Ecological humanities
- Environmental biotechnology
- Environmental chemistry
- Environmental design
- Environmental economics
- Environmental engineering
- Environmental ethics
- Environmental history
- Environmental law
- Environmental psychology
- Environmental science
- Environmental sociology
- Green politics

== Biodiversity ==
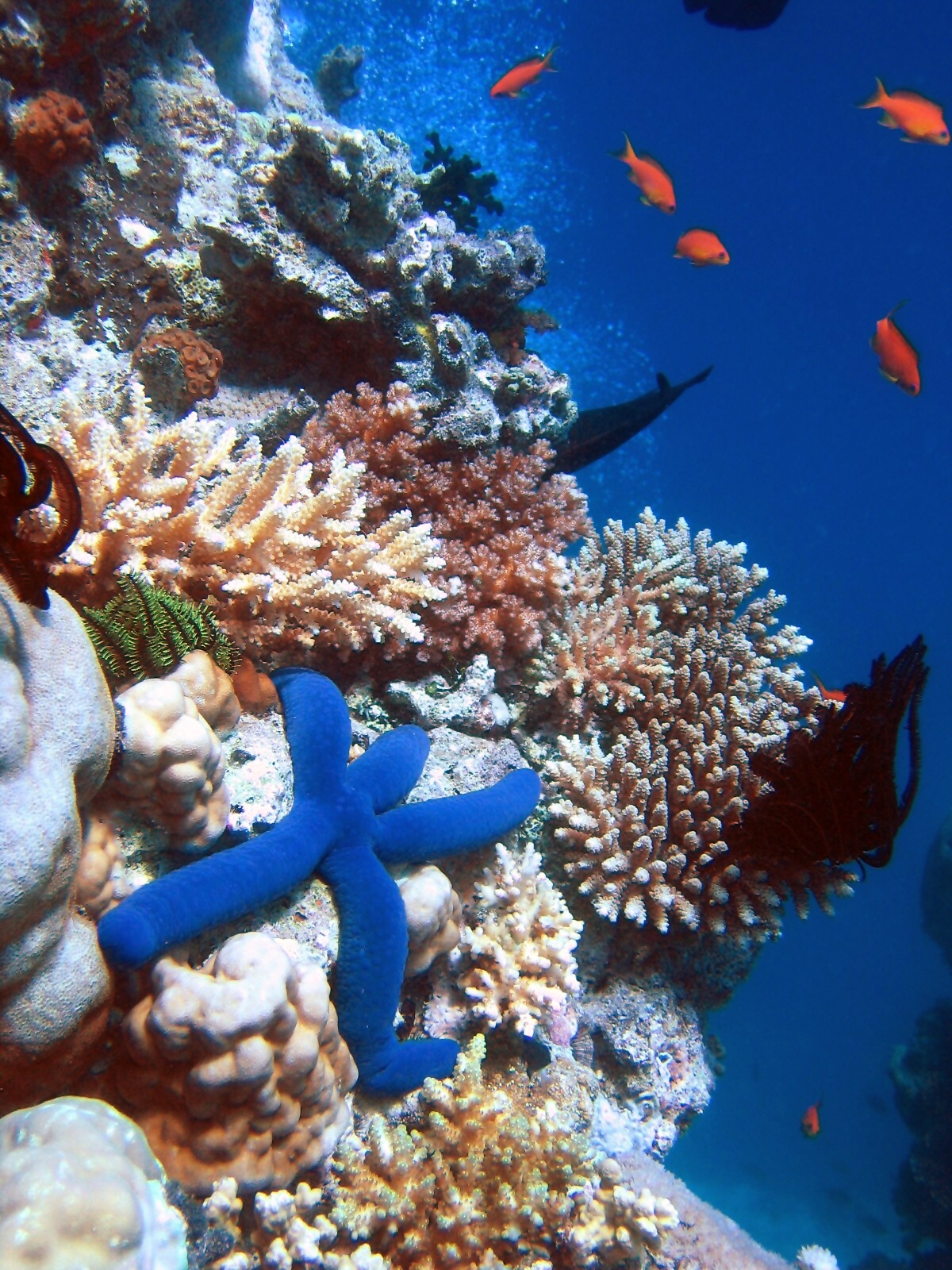
Coral reefs are amongst the most diverse ecosystems on earth.

see also: Biodiversity

- Biosecurity
- Ecosystem services
- Ecosystem-based management
- Ecosystem management
- Endangered species
- Holocene extinction event
- Invasive species
- Nature conservation

=== Levels of biological organisation ===
- Biosphere
- Biome

== Politics of sustainability ==
- Rio Declaration on Environment and Development
- International reports and agreements
  - United Nations Conference on the Human Environment (Stockholm 1972)
  - Brundtlandt Commission Report, 1983
    - Our Common Future, 1987
  - Earth Summit (1992)
  - Agenda 21 (1992)
  - Convention on Biological Diversity (1992)
  - ICPD Programme of Action (1994)
  - Earth Charter
  - Millennium Declaration (2000)
  - Millennium Ecosystem Assessment (2005)
- Politics of global warming
  - Climate change policy of the United States
  - Climate change in China

== Population control ==
Population control

- Birth control
- Carrying capacity
- Family planning
- Human overpopulation
- Sustainable population
- Unintended pregnancy
- Zero population growth

== Environmental technology ==
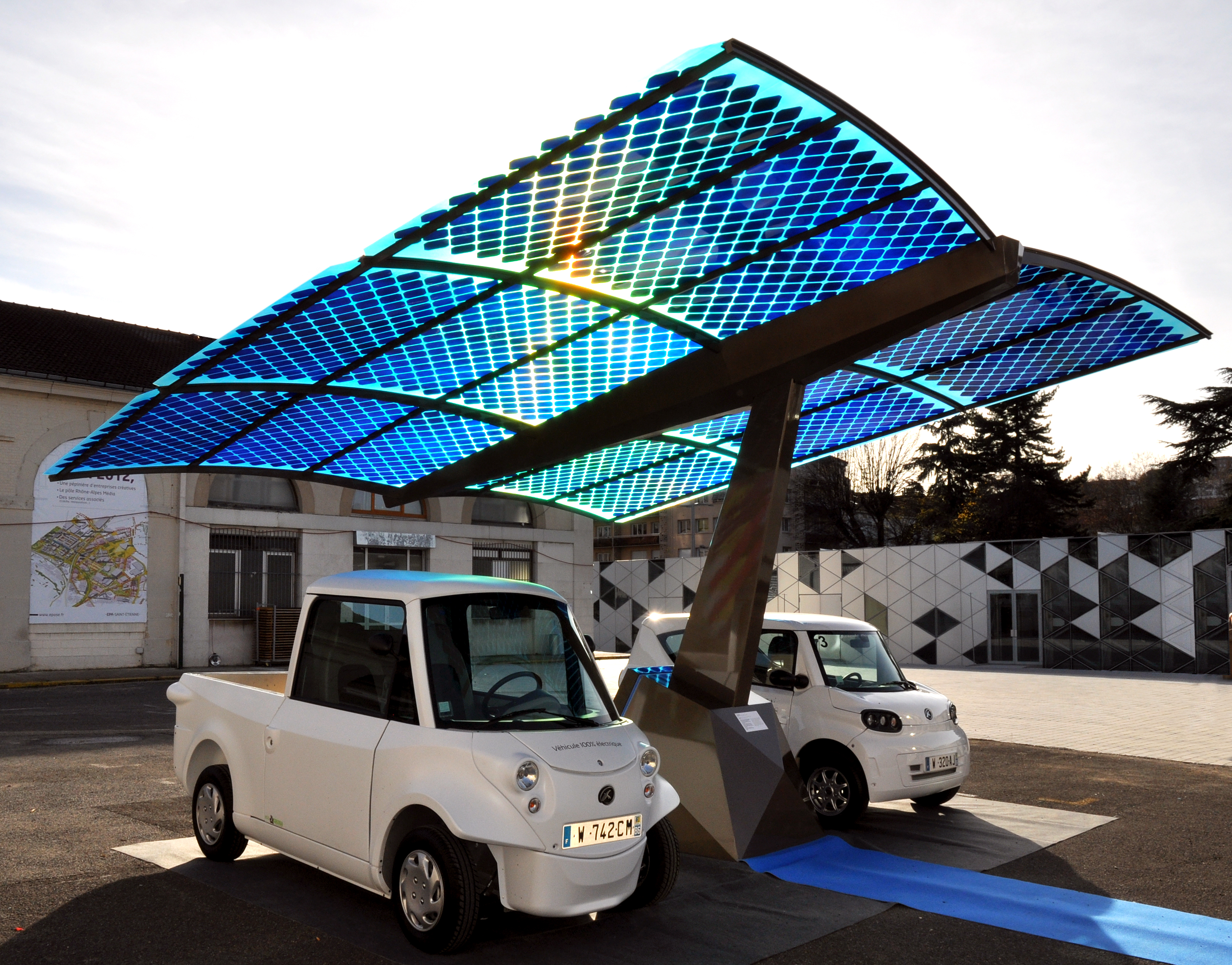
Sustainable urban design and innovation: Photovoltaic ombrière SUDI is an autonomous and mobile station that replenishes energy for electric vehicles using solar energy.

- Bright green environmentalism
- Sustainable energy
- Sustainable sanitation
- Renewable energy
  - Biofuel
  - Biomass
  - Geothermal energy
  - Geothermal heating
  - Geothermal power
  - Hydroelectricity
  - Marine energy
  - Marine current power
  - Ocean thermal energy conversion
  - Solar energy
  - Solar panel
  - Tidal barrage
  - Tidal power
  - Tidal stream generator
  - Wave power
  - Wind power
    - Offshore wind power
  - Wind turbine
    - Floating wind turbine
    - Small wind turbine

=== Energy conservation ===
- Building-integrated photovoltaics
- Carbon footprint
- Efficient energy use
- Emissions trading
- Energy descent
- Energy recovery
- Energy storage
- Energy-plus building
- Green building
- Green computing
- Heat recovery steam generator
- Heat recovery ventilation
- List of low-energy building techniques
- Low-energy house
- Passive house
- Passive solar building design
- Peak oil
- Renewable energy (see above)
- Renewable heat
- Rooftop solar power
- Thermal efficiency
- Zero-energy building

=== Over consumption ===
- Anti-consumerism
- Circular economy
- Circular fashion
- Durable good
- Ecological footprint
- Environmental impact of fashion
- Ethical consumerism
- Fast fashion
- Planned obsolescence
- Throw-away society
- Tragedy of the commons
- Micro-sustainability

=== Food ===
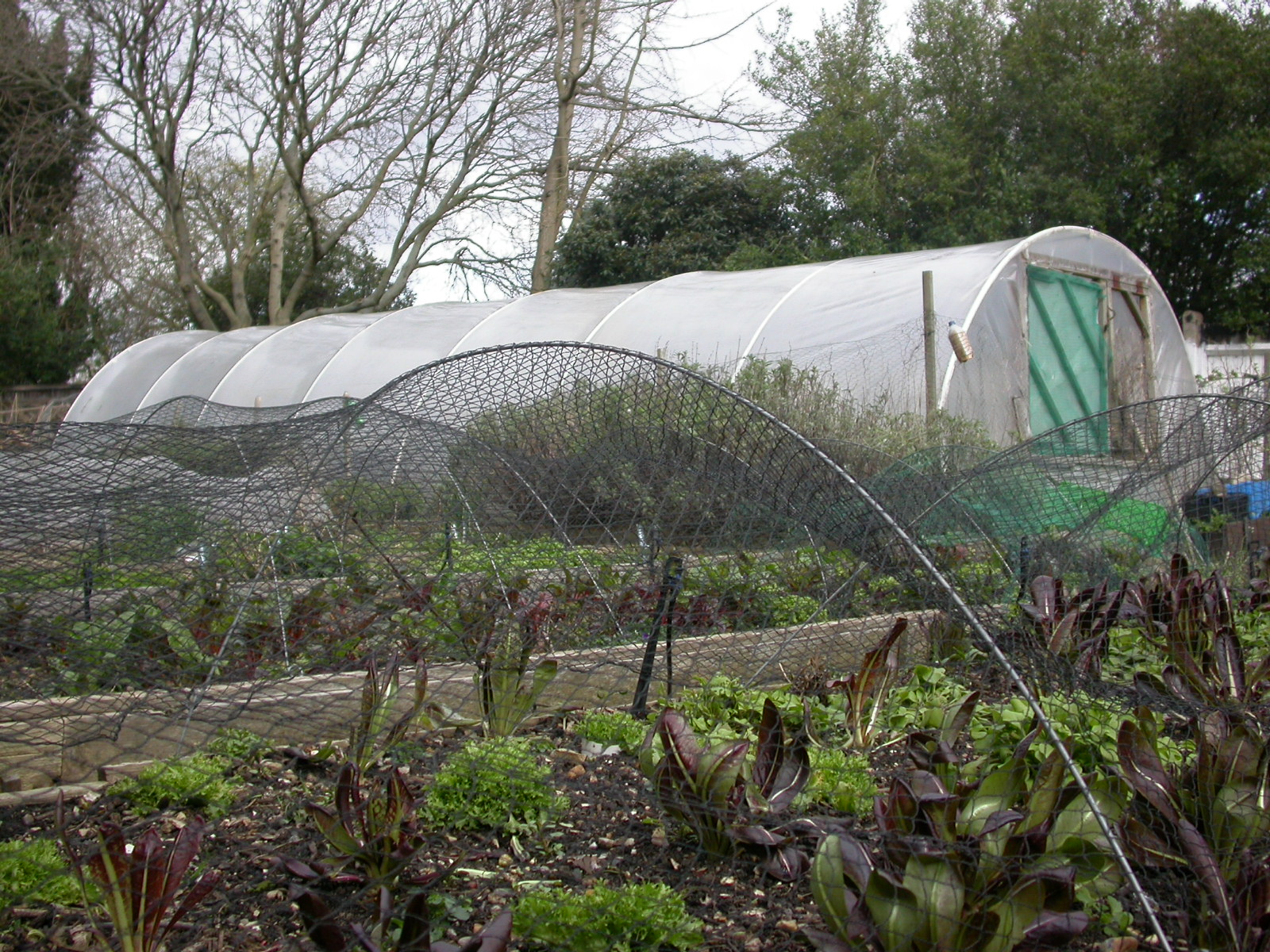
Urban horticulture – Salad lettuce cultivation at the Growing Communities‘ urban plot, in Springfield Park, Clapton, North London

- Cultured meat
- Food security
- Local food
- Permaculture
- Sustainable agriculture
- Sustainable gardening
- Sustainable fisheries
- Urban horticulture

=== Water ===
- Water conservation
- Water crisis
- Water efficiency
- Water footprint
- Water heat recycling
- Water recycling shower

=== Materials ===
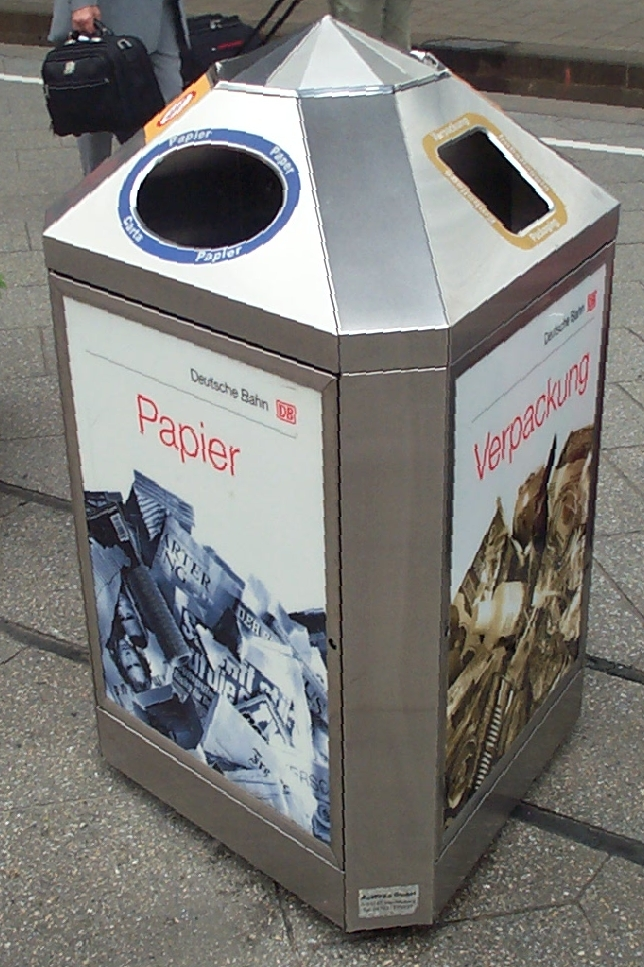
Recycling and rubbish bin in a German railway station

- Industrial ecology
- Pallet crafts
- Rechargeable battery
- Reclaimed lumber
- Recycling
  - Bottle recycling
  - Timber recycling
- Remanufacturing
- Repurposing
- Reuse
  - Reuse of bottles
- Upcycling
- Waste
- Zero waste
  - Zero-waste fashion

== Sustainability organizations ==
- Association of Environmental Professionals

== Sustainability publications ==
- Sustainability (journal)

== Sustainability advocates ==
- Category:Sustainability advocates

== Transport ==
- Bicycle-friendly
- Cyclability
- Cycling advocacy
- Cycling infrastructure
- Externalities of cars
- Green transport hierarchy
- Health and environmental effects of transport
- Pedestrian village
- Sustainable transport
- Walkability
- Walking audit
- Walking city

== See also ==
Sustainability lists

- List of climate change topics
- List of conservation issues
- List of conservation topics
- List of environmental agreements
- List of environmental health hazards
- List of environmental issues
- List of environmental organizations
- Lists of environmental topics
- List of environmental studies topics
- List of global sustainability statistics

Sustainability glossaries

- Glossary of climate change
- Glossary of environmental science
