= Sustainable Value =

2008 book by Chris Laszlo

- Author: Chris Laszlo
- Language: English
- Genre: Non-fiction
- Publisher: Stanford University Press
- Publication date: 2008
- Publication place: United States
- ISBN: 978-0-804-75963-2

Sustainable Value: How the World's Leading Companies Are Doing Well by Doing Good is a book by Chris Laszlo published in 2008 by Stanford University Press (US) and Greenleaf Publishing Ltd. (UK).

== Synopsis ==
Laszlo argues that companies creating sustainable value are going beyond regulatory compliance and energy conservation. They are differentiating their products by making them more accessible (or less toxic) and finding new products that address environmental and social problems, and then driving the innovation into supply that are more "green" in both senses of the word. The book gives a detailed account of the real-life sustainability stories of DuPont, Wal-Mart, Lafarge, and Cargill’s NatureWorks.

Part II outlines the new competitive environment in which societal challenges become huge business opportunities.

Part III introduces the "Sustainable Value tool-kit": a step-by-step approach to creating and managing value for stakeholders in a broad range of sectors.

== Author ==
Chris Laszlo is a visiting professor at Case Western University’s Weatherhead School of Management, and co-founder of Sustainable Value Partners, LLC, where he has advised executives on sustainability for competitive advantage.
