= Lisa Stein =

American biologist and academic

Lisa Yael Stein
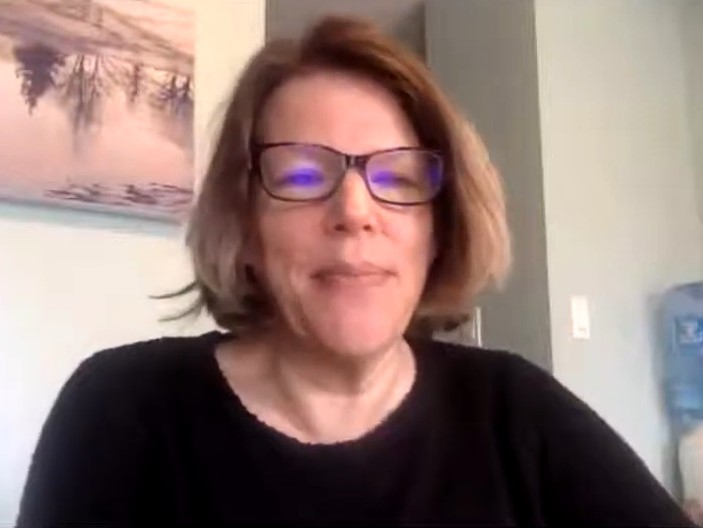
- Stein in 2021
- Education: Oregon State University; University of Colorado, Boulder
- Scientific career
- Workplaces: University of Alberta; University of California, Riverside; Jet Propulsion Laboratory
- Thesis: Effects of ammonia, pH, and nitrite on the physiology of Nitrosmonas europaea, an obligate ammonia-oxidizing bacterium (1998)

Lisa Y. Stein is an American biologist who is a professor at the University of Alberta. Her research considers the microbiology of climate change. She was awarded the 2022 University of Alberta Killam Award for Excellence in Mentoring.

== Early life and education ==
Stein studied cellular and developmental biology at the University of Colorado Boulder. She moved to Oregon State University for her doctoral research, where she studied the physiology of ammonia oxidising bacteria. Stein was a postdoctoral scholar at the Jet Propulsion Laboratory, where she built a mobile field lab to study biogenic gas fluxes in situ. The laboratory could concentrate gases that evolved from a microbial surface, measure the physiochemical changes that take place during a diurnal cycle and characterise a large variety of gases simultaneously.

== Research and career ==
Stein joined the faculty at the University of California, Riverside in 2001, where she investigated the role of soils and microorganisms in the flux of carbon-based gases and other greenhouse gases in and out of soils. She performed a whole genome analysis of ammonia oxidising bacterium. She moved to the University of Alberta in 2008, where she was made Professor in 2016.

Her research considers nitrogen, methane oxidation and carbon fixation in bacteria. She has proposed that gene editing could be an effective strategy to combat climate change. The Haber-Bosch process, the main industrial procedure ammonia production, has dramatically impacted the Nitrogen cycle. This has resulted in excess greenhouse gasses and over production of nitrate, which results in the eutrophication of ground water. In an effort to slow the runaway nitrogen cycle, Stein has proposed to replace chemical fertilisers with nitrification inhibitors. Specifically, she looks to commercialise biological nitrification inhibitors.

In 2019 she was one of 11,000 scientists who signed a letter declaring a climate emergency. Stein was awarded the 2022 Killam Award for Excellence in Mentoring.

== Selected publications ==
- Ricardo Cavicchioli; William J Ripple; Kenneth N Timmis; et al. (18 June 2019). "Scientists' warning to humanity: microorganisms and climate change". Nature Reviews Microbiology. 17 (9): 569–586. doi:10.1038/s41579-019-0222-5. ISSN 1740-1534. PMC 7136171. PMID 31213707. Wikidata Q92860849.
- K Dimitri Kits; Christopher J Sedlacek; Elena V Lebedeva; et al. (23 August 2017). "Kinetic analysis of a complete nitrifier reveals an oligotrophic lifestyle". Nature. 549 (7671): 269–272. doi:10.1038/nature23679. ISSN 1476-4687. PMC 5600814. PMID 28847001. Wikidata Q46315566.
- Lisa Y. Stein; Martin G. Klotz (February 2016). "The nitrogen cycle". Current Biology. 26 (3): R94–R98. doi:10.1016/j.cub.2015.12.021. ISSN 0960-9822. PMID 26859274. Wikidata Q56594727.
