= Committee on Sustainability Assessment =

Committee on Sustainability Assessment (COSA)
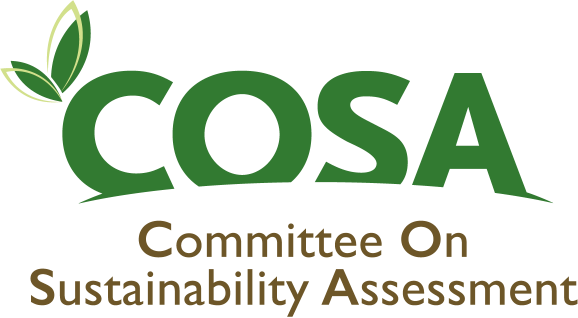
- Formation: Project of UNCTAD: 2005 Independent Non-profit: 2012
- Founders: Daniele Giovannucci, Jason Potts
- Type: Non-profit, NGO
- Purpose: Scientific measurement of social, economic, and environmental factors affecting agriculture crops and communities.
- Members: IISD – International Institute of Sustainable Development, UNCTAD – United Nations Conference on Trade and Development, CIRAD – Centre de Coopération Internationale en Recherche Agronomique pour le Développement, INCAE – Instituto Centroamericano de Administración de Empresas, CATIE – Centro Agronómico Tropical de Investigación y Enseñanza
- Website: http://thecosa.org

The Committee on Sustainability Assessment (COSA) is a global consortium of development institutions that work collaboratively to advance sustainability learning with systematic and science-based measurement. COSA applies a pragmatic and collective approach for using scientific methods to develop indicators, tools, and technologies to measure the distinct social, environmental, and economic impacts and are applied in performance monitoring, evaluation, return on investment (ROI) calculation, and impact assessment. COSA has a public mission to open its scientific methods and metrics up to widespread use.

COSA's approach and indicators have a basis in internationally recognized accords and normative references such as those of the International Labour Organization, the World Health Organization Guidelines for Water Quality, the International Finance Corporation, the United Nations Global Compact, Rio Declaration on Environment and Development, UN Framework Convention on Climate Change, and the Universal Declaration of Human Rights.

== History ==
The concept for COSA was originally developed in 2005 as a project of the United Nations Conference on Trade and Development, the International Institute for Sustainable Development and the United Nations International Trade Centre with initial focus on the coffee sector. The COSA indicator development process was inaugurated through the International Coffee Organization whose Council unanimously endorsed it, making it the first sustainability assessment system to be formally adopted by a global commodity body. It has since been applied in various fields such as cocoa, sugar, cotton, fruit, and food crops. The United Nations Conference on Trade and Development COSA project focused on developing a thorough and rigorous cost benefit analysis of sustainability practices in the coffee sector via two primary outputs: a tool for assessing costs and benefits according to COSA-defined criteria and indicators, and training to enable stakeholders to "measure and understand the costs and benefits of undertaking sustainable practices and adopting different sustainability initiatives."

In 2008, COSA published a report titled "Seeking Sustainability: COSA Preliminary Analysis of Sustainability Initiatives in the Coffee Sector". The report summarized the findings of the pilot application of the COSA tool to collect and analyze data to facilitate understanding of environmental, social, and economic outcomes associated with sustainability initiatives in the coffee sector. The six sustainability initiatives included were: Organic, Fair Trade, Common Code for the Coffee Community (4C), UTZ Certified, Rainforest Alliance, and Starbucks C.A.F.E. Practices. As its impact research expanded across Africa, Asia, and Latin America, COSA published in 2014 the largest known comparative study on the impacts of the major sustainability standards and certifications.

In 2012, led by its founder and President Daniele Giovannucci, the structure and constitution of COSA was formalized as an independent non-profit organization incorporated under United States law to advance research and training in the field of sustainability. It is as this globally-focused, independent non-profit that COSA continues its work today. Initial core support came primarily from the Swiss State Secretariat for Economic Affairs, the Ford Foundation, the Inter-American Development Bank and other public donors. COSA is supported by public grants, sustainability advisory services, and impact assessment research.

== Working in partnerships ==
COSA supports institutions and businesses to adopt and integrate approaches to sustainability, and includes close to 100 public and private sector organizations. COSA partners with research and development institutions to adopt, integrate, and build local sustainability measurement and evaluation capacity in the countries where it works, as well as for bilateral learning. Local partnerships to conduct research have included the Institute of Statistical, Social, and Economic Research at the University of Ghana, the Centro de Estudios Regionales Cafeteros y Empresariales in Colombia, the strategic think tank of the Vietnamese Ministry of Agriculture and Rural Development, the Instituto de Estudios Peruanos, the Indonesian Coffee and Cocoa Research Institute, and the CGIAR Consortium of research organizations.

The COSA partnership with the International Institute for Tropical Agriculture, in Kenya and Uganda, led to new processes with the International Initiative for Impact Evaluation (3ie) for conducting field research to advance the understanding of the challenges faced by smallholder farmers and the roles of their cooperatives. The work, commissioned by the International Social and Environmental Accreditation and Labelling (ISEAL) Alliance with support of the Ford Foundation, evolved methods for assessing the impacts of multiple sustainability certifications on the lives of farmers, their organizations, and communities. COSA piloted the Grameen Foundation’s Progress Out of Poverty Index in coffee (Guatemala, Mexico, Peru) and cocoa (Nicaragua, Colombia), and adopted them into its suite of indicators.

COSA works in development projects with sustainability labels such as Fair Trade, Organic, UTZ Certified, 4C, and Rainforest Alliance. Private supply chains have utilized COSA to assess and measure the impact of their sustainability efforts, fostered by development agencies such as the International Finance Corporation, USAID, or the Swiss Government, and include firms such as Nespresso, Lindt and Sprungli, Mars Drinks, Cargill, ECOM Trading and Mondelez International. According to a Cheddar News interview with COSA’s founder, issues that major firms are looking at include digital traceability, return on sustainability investment and living income for farmers.

== Accomplishments ==
COSA indicators and tools have been widely incorporated and adapted by institutions, corporations, and other organizations. Its metrics cover a range of commodity crops (coffee, cocoa, tea, sugar, cotton, food crops) and thematic areas (resilience, producer organizations, gender, landscape systems, and Living Income).

- The Textile Exchange adapted COSA indicators to create the Organic Cotton Sustainability Assessment Tool to assess the sustainability impact of organic cotton.
- COSA led the efforts to establish global metrics for small farmer sustainability for the Food and Agriculture Organization of the United Nations, which commissioned COSA, along with the Grameen Foundation and Soil & More International, to develop the metrics for its Sustainability Assessment of Food and Agriculture systems Tool.
- The International Social and Environmental Accreditation and Labelling Impacts Code is aligned with COSA indicators as is the Shared Framework for Performance Measurement of the Sustainable Food Lab and the Shared Approach to Performance Measurement: Common Indicators and Metrics" that was developed in partnership with Ford Foundation, IDH The Sustainable Trade Initiative, Seas of Change, MARS Chocolate, Root Capital, International Social and Environmental Accreditation and Labelling Alliance, Nestle, Rainforest Alliance, and Centre for Development Innovation.
- The International Cotton Advisory Committee's Expert Panel on the Social, Environmental, and Economic Performance of Cotton and the Food and Agriculture Organization Plant Production and Protection Division published a guidance framework for measuring the sustainability of cotton farming systems with indicators that were in part informed by COSA's decade of work in the field.
- For the Ford Foundation, COSA designed simple assessment tools and guidelines for Ford Foundation grantees to utilize in order to improve the design and management of their food crop projects.
- With the Multilateral Investment Fund (MIF) Inter-American Development Bank Sustainable Agriculture, Food, and Environment platform, COSA helps funded projects to establish or improve their measurement and evaluation systems to achieve greater levels of scalability and share lessons and knowledge across the funding Platform.
- COSA also collaborates with multi-stakeholder industry initiatives such as the Sustainable Coffee Challenge led by Conservation International, the Global Coffee Platform, and the Farmer Income Lab led by Mars and Danone.
- COSA developed pragmatic smallholder resilience assessment metrics, distilled from a review of global best practices in collaboration with a globally acknowledged Resilience Working Group.
- As a contributor to the Living Income Community of Practice, and in partnership with the Royal Tropical Institute (KIT), COSA developed guidance protocol for measuring farmer incomes and for calculating the Living Income gap.

== Evolving sustainability intelligence ==
In a 2018 keynote address COSA Board Chair Daniele Giovannucci asserted that a new wave of development funding was emerging, led by private companies and investment, with less focus on altruism and more on competitiveness and risk management. New technologies and software increasingly facilitate the ability to rapidly collect, calculate, and share data to provide insights about sustainability performance, risk, impact, and returns on sustainability investments. Development organizations such as the Inter-American Development Bank have applied this concept using comparable data to learn across projects and better determine which investments or programs are more likely to be successfully scaled.

== Data to benefit farmers ==
Studies that gather data from farmers and farm communities typically do not provide that data to survey subjects. COSA takes the approach that data on farm-level sustainability that governments, businesses, and others obtain should also benefit farmers directly. They promote the concept of "data democracy". With the International Coffee Organization, they work with coffee-producing countries and their national institutions to ensure that critical data like cost of production is owned and managed locally.

== Recognition ==
COSA has been recognized in the international development and sustainability communities for its "visible and impartial" assessments. Following the 2014 publication of the COSA Measuring Sustainability Report: Coffee and Cocoa in 12 Countries, ISEAL Alliance called COSA a leader in the "alignment of standards and certification initiatives, showing the potential of harmonizing metrics."
