= List of global sustainability statistics =

Global sustainability statistics are benchmarks for measuring the status of sustainability parameters. The following agencies provide baseline data for sustainability governance. They are just one form of data used for sustainability accounting and are valuable for assessing trends and measuring progress.

This list provides sources of statistics at the global level of governance only.

- General lists
  - Meadows, D.H., Randers, J. & Meadows, D.L. 2004. Limits to growth: the 30-year update. Chelsea Green Publishing Company, White River Junction, USA.
  - The CIAs World Fact Book
  - World Data Center
  - United Nations Environmental Indicators Also publications on environmental statistics and statistical methods.
    - Water (water resources, water supply industry, waste water)
    - Air pollution (SO_{2} & NO_{x}),
    - Climate change (greenhouse gas emissions; by sector(absolute & percentage); CO_{2} emissions; CH_{4} & N_{2}O emissions)
    - Waste (municipal waste collection, treatment, hazardous waste)
    - Land use (total land area by country, forest area by country, agricultural area by country).
  - European Commission (Eurostat)
- Biodiversity
  - Groombridge, B & Jenkins, M.D. 2002. World Atlas of Biodiversity. UNEP World Conservation Monitoring Centre
- Energy
  - BP Statistical Review of World Energy
  - The International Energy Agency. Key World Energy Statistics
  - UN Energy Statistics Database
- Fisheries
  - UN Food and Agriculture Organization
- Forests
  - UN Food and Agriculture Organization
- Fertilizer
  - International Fertilizer Industry Association
- Food and agriculture
  - UN Food and Agriculture Organization. FAOSTAT
- Population
  - United Nations Population Division
  - United Nations Database
  - Population Reference Bureau
  - American Association for Advancement of Science
- Water
  - International Water Management Institute
  - Stockholm International Water Institute
  - United Nations Environmental Program
  - Global Runoff Data Centre

== See also ==
- Sustainability accounting
- Sustainability science
- Sustainability governance
- Sustainability
- Sustainable development
