= William J. Ripple =

Professor of ecology

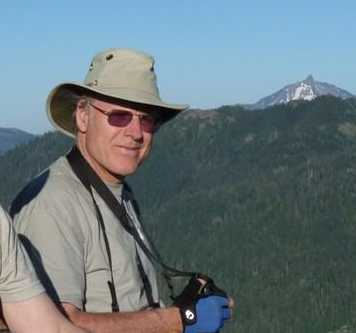
- William Ripple in 2010.
- Education: South Dakota State University, University of Idaho College of Mines and Earth Resources, Oregon State University
- Known for: Research of landscape-level trophic interactions involving apex predators and large herbivores
- Scientific career
- Fields: Ecology
- Workplaces: Oregon State University
- Website: Trophic Cascades Program

William J. Ripple is a professor of ecology at Oregon State University in the Department of Forest Ecosystems and Society. He is best known for his research on terrestrial trophic cascades, particularly the role of the gray wolf (Canis lupus) in North America as an apex predator and a keystone species that shapes food webs and landscape structures via "top-down" pressures.

Ripple heads the Trophic Cascades Program at Oregon State University, which carries out several research initiatives such as the Aspen Project, the Wolves in Nature Project, and the Range Contractions Project. He has a Ph.D. from Oregon State University

Ripple was the lead author on the "Global Scientists' Warning to Humanity: A second Notice", published on November 13, 2017. This article includes 15,364 scientist co-signatories from 184 countries. The article suggests "To prevent widespread misery and catastrophic biodiversity loss, humanity must practice a more environmentally sustainable alternative to business as usual." In 2020, Ripple led The World Scientists' Warning of a Climate Emergency, declaring with more than 11,000 scientist co-signatories from 153 countries that "Planet Earth is facing a climate emergency" and presenting six steps for avoiding the worst effects of climate change. Subsequently, Ripple has led an annual "World Scientists' Warning of a Climate Emergency" series of reports.

In addition to being a Highly Cited Researcher, Ripple is the director of the Alliance of World Scientists, an independent organization with more than 25,000 scientist members that acts as a "collective international voice of many scientists regarding global climate and environmental trends."

Ripple's work on environmental issues was highlighted in The Scientists' Warning—a documentary film about a researcher who started a movement to encourage scientists to help turn scientific knowledge into action.

== Research ==
William Ripple is the author of more than 100 peer-reviewed scientific articles, most of which deal with trophic cascades.

Ripple, along with his frequent coauthor, Robert Beschta, have studied, published, and publicized the positive impact that gray wolves have had on the Yellowstone National Park ecosystem since their reintroduction in 1995 and 1996. These studies were featured in National Geographic Magazine, Discover Magazine, Smithsonian Magazine, and Scientific American. Their research was also featured in the William Stolzenburg book, Where the Wild Things Were: Life, Death, and Ecological Wreckage in a Land of Vanishing Predators, and the documentary film Lords of Nature: Living in a Land of Great Predators.

Ripple's research carries a large focus on the gray wolf, particularly in the Greater Yellowstone Ecosystem, but has also studied the impact of other large North American predators, such as the cougar (Puma concolor). He has coauthored papers with other scientists in the field of trophic cascades and apex predators, including an exhaustive review of the status and ecological impacts of the world's 31 largest mammalian carnivores. He led an international team of scientists reviewing the status and ecological effects of the world's largest herbivores. Ripple has also applied trophic cascade theory to the subject of the Pleistocene megafaunal extinctions. The hypothesis being that North American Pleistocene megafauna existed at low population densities, primarily limited by the apex predators of the time. The arrival of a novel and essentially invasive top predator (humans) could have driven these predator-limited populations to extinction.

More recently, William Ripple has participated in publications addressing issues that are not immediately related to the subject of trophic cascades. Many of these articles deal with climate change. One such article, published in the journal Nature Climate Change, advocates for reducing the total ruminant population in global agriculture as a means to combat anthropogenic climate change. Because methane is an important greenhouse gas, reducing a leading source of human-driven methane emissions such as those from ruminants could have a significant role to play in efforts to mitigate climate change. Ripple also co-authored an assessment of the carbon opportunity cost of animal-sourced food production and a study on the climate mitigation potential of substituting beans for beef. In 2023, Ripple led a study describing the risks associated with climate feedback loops.

== Awards and honors ==
- 2020 - Oregon State University; "Richardson Endowed Chair in Forest Science".
- 2014 - Oregon State University; "2014 Distinguished Professor Award".
- 2011 - Oregon State University; "L.L. Stewart Faculty Scholars Program award".
- 2009 - Defenders of Wildlife; "Spirit of Defenders Award for Science", for his work studying the links between top predators and healthy ecosystems.
- 2008 - High Desert Museum; "Earle A. Chiles Award" for his research on trophic cascades and "pioneering new ways of interpreting predator, prey and plant relationships in High Desert ecosystems, and improving ecosystem management."
- 1996 - American Society for Photogrammetry and Remote Sensing (ASPRS) Fellow.

== Bibliography ==
- William J. Ripple and Nicholas R. Houtman (2019). "Chapter 2: Scientists' warnings have been ignored". In Extinction Rebellion (ed.). This Is Not a Drill: An Extinction Rebellion Handbook. Penguin Books. pp. 28–30. ISBN 978-0-14-199144-3.
