= Sustainability accounting =

Concept in financial accounting

Sustainability accounting (also known as social accounting, social and environmental accounting, corporate social reporting, corporate social responsibility reporting, or non-financial reporting) originated in the 1970s and is considered a subcategory of financial accounting that focuses on the disclosure of non-financial information about a firm's performance to external stakeholders, such as capital holders, creditors, and other authorities. Sustainability accounting represents the activities that have a direct impact on society, environment, and economic performance of an organisation. Sustainability accounting in managerial accounting contrasts with financial accounting in that managerial accounting is used for internal decision making and the creation of new policies that will have an effect on the organisation's performance at economic, ecological, and social (known as the triple bottom line or Triple-P's; People, Planet, Profit) level. Sustainability accounting is often used to generate value creation within an organisation.

Sustainability accounting is a tool used by organisations to become more sustainable. The most known widely used measurements are the Corporate Sustainability Reporting (CSR) and triple bottom line accounting. These recognise the role of financial information and shows how traditional accounting is extended by improving transparency and accountability by reporting on the Triple-P's.

As a result of triple bottom level reporting, and in order to render and guarantee consistency in social and environmental information, the GRI (Global Reporting Initiative) was established with the goal to provide guidelines to organisations reporting on sustainability. In some countries, guidelines were developed to complement the GRI. The GRI states that "reporting on economic, environmental and social performance by all organizations is as routine and comparable as financial reporting".

Scheme of sustainable development: at the confluence of three constituent parts.

== History ==
The concept of sustainability accounting has emerged from developments in accounting. Broad developments in accounting have occurred over the past forty years, although narrow developments have occurred over the past ten years. The development reveals two distinct lines of analysis. The first line is the philosophical debate about accountability, if and how it contributes to sustainable development and which are the necessary steps towards sustainability. This approach is based on an entirely new system of accounting designed to promote a strategy of sustainability. The second line is the management perspective associated with varied terms and tools towards sustainability. This could be seen as an extension of or modification to conventional financial cost or management accounting. To develop sustainability accounting de novo allows a complete reappraisal of the relative significance of social, environmental and economic benefits and risks and their interactions in corporate accounting systems. The developments that lead to sustainable accounting could be distinguished in several time periods in which a number of trends were evident: 1971–1980, 1981–1990, 1991–1995 and up to the present. These periods distinguish empirical studies, normative statements, philosophical discussion, teaching programmes, literature and regulatory frameworks.

=== 1971–1980 ===
By the end of the decade, a large volume of empirical work and a number of papers referring to the building of models which foster social accounting disclosures have been published. These early works included subjective analysis as well as underdeveloped social and environmental accounting literature (SEAL). Information related to the social dimension of accounting has been mostly connected with employees or products. Environmental matters were treated as part of a generally undifferentiated and fairly unsophisticated social accounting movement.

Environmental damage included damage to terrain, air, water, noise, visual and aesthetic and other forms of pollution, and solid-waste production. Ideas about shadow prices and mapping of externalities first arose and began to develop. Albeit the contribution of this period was notable for extensive developments in the field of social audit, the methodology was nearly identical with the historical financial accounting reports. At this time neither financial accounting standards nor regulatory frameworks had been developed to any extent. The empirical studies and research were mainly descriptive. Although several models and similar normative statements were enhanced, the philosophical debate was not widespread.

=== 1981–1990 ===
The first part of the decade showed increased sophistication within the social accounting area and the second part of the decade saw an apparent transference of interest to environmental accounting, with increasing signs of specialisation in literature. Empirical research was more analytical. Concerns of social disclosures have been replaced by a concentration on environmental disclosures and regulation as an alternative means of reducing environmental damage. Normative statements and model building began to foster the environmental arena. During this period, the development of teaching programmes about social and environmental accounting issues began. Despite an increasing use of conceptual frameworks, accounting standards, and legal provisions to reduce the degree of individual interpretation in financial reporting, little of this accounting structure applies to an appropriate framework of social and environmental accounting. Less normative statement have been made, but more articles discussing philosophical matters have been published.

=== 1991–1995 ===
This period was characterised by the almost complete domination of environmental accounting over social accounting. There have also been a number of extensions from environmental disclosures to environmental auditing as well as the development of framework to guide the applications of environmental auditing, and in particular, the development of environmental management systems. There was still little regulatory framework affecting social and environmental accounting disclosures and conceptual frameworks for accounting did not extend to non-financial quantification and social or environmental issues. The development of a clear regulatory as well as conceptual framework grew in several countries, whereas the progress of environmental regulation in the UK and Europe was slower than in the United States, Canada or Australia. The progress was uneven but rapid compared with those in the area of social accounting disclosures. During this period, there have been several textbooks and journal articles covering both social and environmental accounting. However, there has been a relative lack of normative/philosophical work within accounting during this period: environmental accounting has not been revived since the models of the 1970s and has failed to adapt to the discussions about the valuation of externalities. Sustainability and the discussion of the role of management accounting in assisting with sustainable development have become of growing interest.

=== 1995–present ===
The convergence of global capital markets and the emergence of global and regional quality control issues – culminating for the accounting profession in the Asian financial crisis in 1997–1998 as well the collapse of Enron in 2001 – led to a subsequent high-level focus on international and national accounting. The accounting literature has demonstrated a considerable increase in concern for the issues of sustainable development and accounting. Via the exploration of what sustainability accounting may entail, the accounting profession is likely to be involved in re-examining accounting fundamentals in the light of the challenge of sustainable development. Several proposals and significant statistical work as well as a growing body of measurement on accounting for sustainable development is being carried out in many international and national settings. Even supra-national policy bodies like the United Nations and the OECD have sponsored work addressing accounting for sustainability. Up till now environmental accounting is the most evolved form of sustainability accounting and increasingly processed in the academic circle beginning with the work of Robert Hugh Gray in the early 1990s, and through the release of the Sustainability Accounting Guidelines at the World Summit on Sustainable Development in 2002.

Due to the use of different frameworks and methods, much uncertainty remains how this agenda will develop in the future. There is a wide consensus that past economic development and the current human (and hence business) activities are not sustainable, which has led to questioning the current mode of development. Recent years have seen an increasing acceptance and even enthusiasm for these new reporting approaches. Energetic and innovative experimentation by far-sighted organisations state that sustainability aspects in accounting and reporting are crucially important, feasible and practicable as well.In this respect, the International Federation of Accountants (IFAC), whose objective is to develop the accounting profession and harmonise its standards, includes 167 member bodies in over 127 countries and represents approximately over two million accountants worldwide.

In order to help finance teams and accountants embed sustainability into their accounting, King Charles III, then Prince of Wales, set up his Accounting for Sustainability project (A4S) in 2004. A4S convenes leaders in the finance and accounting communities to catalyse a fundamental shift towards resilient business models and a sustainable economy. A4S has two global networks – the Accounting Bodies Network (ABN) whose members comprise approximately two thirds of the world's accountants and the A4S CFO Leadership Network, a group of CFOs from leading companies seeking to transform finance and accounting.

== Methodology ==
Sustainability accounting has increased in popularity in the last couple of decades. Many companies are adopting new methods and techniques in their financial disclosures and are providing information about the core activities and the impact that these have on the environment. As a result of this, stakeholders, suppliers, and governmental institutions want a better understanding of how companies manage their resources to achieve their goals to accomplish sustainable development.

According to common definitions there are three key dimensions of sustainability. Every dimension focuses on different subsets.

Environmental factors	Social	Economic
Energy; Water; Greenhouse gases; Emissions; Hazardous and non hazardous waste; Recycling; Packaging	Community investment; Working conditions; Human rights and fair trade; Public policy; Diversity; Safety; Anticorruption	Accountability / Transparency; Corporate governance; Stakeholder value; Economic performance; Financial performance

Sustainability accounting connects the companies' strategies from a sustainable framework by disclosing information on the three dimensional levels (environment, economical and social). In practice, however, it is difficult to put together policies that simultaneously promote environmental, economic and social goals.

This trend has encouraged companies to not only emphasize creation of value but also risk mitigation that are linked to the environmental and social subset of sustainable development. This development has been driven by multiple factors connected to:

1. Sustainability issues that materially affect a company's creation of value, risk and liabilities
2. The need for business to appropriately respond to sustainable growth.

=== Reporting formats ===
The concept of sustainability accounting is being carried out in an international setting with a vast and growing level of experience in the measurement of sustainable development. It recognises the role of financial information and shows how this can be extended to the social and environmental level. Although there isn't an established framework of reporting, the content of a company's report can be largely determined by factors and reporting standards, guidelines, and regulations. This trend offers companies a greater flexibility than financial statements. An effective report delivers information aligned to the company's overall objectives and engage with the audience in a manner that promotes the exchange of ideas and communication.

Nowadays, there are several ways and mechanisms of reporting, such as assurance statements, environmental, social and economic performance reports, that have been noted. Some of these reports include shorter and more concise reports. Some companies are including in their reports a combination of hard copies and online resources as well as downloadable PDF files. Some examples can be found at the GRI, which is the most popular framework for companies that are looking for help and assistance in how to create their sustainability report. As the trend to produce sustainability reports increases, so too do the guidelines and frameworks to report on the social environmental information.

=== Frameworks ===
As sustainability accounting continues to develop, companies continue to gain understanding of the scenery of reporting frameworks, standards and guidelines that may affect the form and content of their reports. There are several organisations that offer services to companies that want to change their traditional financial statement disclosures for sustainability reporting.

In most countries around the world, there are currently no governmental requirements for companies to prepare and publish sustainability reports. Companies that have started to adopt this new method of reporting have faced new challenges in reporting due to the lack of experience. Failing to report accordingly to the guidelines and frameworks provided (see OECD and GRI) would lead them to potentially reduce their credibility of published information.

The GRI, OECD and UNCSD (United Nations Commission on Sustainable Development) are some of the main actors in developing a policy framework that better integrates the three dimensional levels of sustainability by decoupling economic growth from environmental pressures.

The GRI is a multi-stakeholder organization that is committed to developing and maintaining the "Sustainability Reporting Guidelines". The goal is the continuous improvement of sustainability reporting, a protocol that approaches the application levels. There are three levels of reporting: A, B and C, but these are not yet legally ratified fundamentals and are only used to assist companies with their sustainable reports.

On one hand, the UNCSD focuses only on the environmental dimension of the sustainability accounting.

On the other hand, the OECD (Organization for Economic Co-operation and Development) focuses only in two frameworks: the analytical and accounting frameworks.

==== Analytical frameworks ====
Analytical frameworks link information from different areas. Various types of frameworks are being used nowadays depending on the purpose of measurement. These frameworks seek to:

- Integrate the economic, environmental and social dimensions of sustainable development
- Have sound foundations and to maintain key information needed to improve sustainable development measurements
- Clarify relationships between different indicators and policies

Some examples of analytical frameworks are: Pressure – State – Response (PSR) model which is based on one of its variants, Driving Force – Pressure – State – Impact – Response used by the European Environment Agency (EEA), or the Driving Force – State – Response model.

One such analytical framework is the sustainability balanced scorecard model. Using the popular balanced scorecard framework as its basis, the sustainability balanced scorecard model requires new data for sustainability, which can be obtained through eco-efficiency analysis. Eco-efficiency analysis observes the causal relationship between economic value creation and environmental impact added through two forms of assessment: lifecycle inventories and lifecycle impact. These assessments connect the balanced scorecard to corporate environmental accounting systems by joining different modeling processes. This method observes the relationships between the social, environmental, and economic dimensions.

Another analytical framework that monitors and tracks corporate performance is the sustainability evaluation and reporting system (SERS). Developed by the Research Centre of Bocconi University on Risk, Security, Occupational Health and Safety, Environment and Crisis Management (SPACE), SERS was developed to address the challenges faced by organizations when managing various stakeholder relationships. SERS compiles various management tools (e.g. key performance indicators, environmental reporting, and social reporting) to create an inclusive model. SERS is composed of three modules: the overall reporting system (which is composed of the annual report, the social report, the environmental report, and a set of integrated performance indicators), the integrated information system, and KPIs for corporate sustainability. SERS is flexible, allowing it to be applied to companies across different industries, sizes, and countries. SERS also allows for the comprehensive monitoring of qualitative and quantitative information to aid in overall corporate goals. For example, a metric could compare the total value of waste generated during the year to the value added by a process.

==== Accounting frameworks ====
On the other hand, the accounting frameworks seek to quantify information in the three dimensions of sustainability accounting. The System of National Accounts (SNA) show that measuring sustainable development with the conventional system of financial reporting is inadequate. The accounting structure imposes a more systematic approach that is not too flexible in comparison to the standards and frameworks that offer the GRI and OECD among others. Accounting for sustainability therefore requires an extension of its standard framework. The OECD offers two different approaches to the accounting framework for sustainability accounting.

1. Measuring environmental-economic-social interrelationships
2. Wealth-based approaches

Measuring environmental-economic-social interrelationships requires a clear understanding of the relationships that exists between the natural environment and the economy. It is not possible without understanding the physical representation. The physical flow accounts are helpful in showing the characteristics of production and consumption activities. Some of these accounts focus on the physical exchange between the economic system and natural environment.

Wealth-based approaches to sustainability refer to the preservation of stock of wealth. Sustainability is observed as the maintenance of the capital base of a country and therefore potentially measured. A number of environmental changes are also contained in these financial statements that are measured during an accounting period of time.

The GRI offers advanced material to help organisations of all types to create their accountability reports. This published material lead organisations through the reporting process with the main idea of becoming more sustainable in their practices in everyday business.

Specific techniques to measure information in sustainability accounting include:

1. Inventory Approach
2. Sustainable Cost Approach
3. Resource Flow/Input-Output Approach

The Inventory Approach focuses on the different categories of natural capital and their consumption and/or enhancement. This approach identifies, records, monitors, and then reports on these different categories. These categories are analyzed according to specific classifications, including critical, non-renewable/nonsubstitutable, non-renewable/substitutable, and renewable natural capital.

The Sustainable Cost Approach results in a notional amount on the income statement that quantifies the organization's failure to "leave the biosphere at the end of the accounting period no worse off than it was at the beginning of the accounting period". In other words, this amount represents how much it would cost an organization to return the biosphere to its natural state at the beginning of the accounting period.

The Resource Flow/Input-Output Approach attempts to report the resource flows of the organization. Rather than explicitly reporting sustainability, it focuses on resources used to provide transparency. This approach catalogues the resources flowing into and out of the organization to pinpoint potential areas of improvement.

== Motivations ==
There are six main motivations for practicing sustainability accounting:

1. Greenwashing
2. Mimicry and industry pressure
3. Legislative pressure
4. Stakeholder pressure and ensuring the "license to operate"
5. Self-regulation, corporate responsibility and ethical reasons
6. Managing the business case for sustainability

Möller and Schaltegger add that another motivation is to assist in decision-making. They state that making decisions solely based on financial information is superficial at best. They add that there are certain business areas that financial data cannot precisely evaluate, such as customer satisfaction, organizational learning, and product quality. They propose that a mix of financial and nonfinancial info can help make well-informed decisions.

Shareholders say that they want to see more sustainability reporting because it translates to increased corporate financial performance. This is because sustainability requires a long-term vision, which is reflected in strategic planning. Strategic planning is manifested in long-term visions and a wider range of responsibilities toward its stakeholders. Companies that place emphasis on sustainability practices have higher financial performance, as measured by profit before taxation, return on assets, and cash flow from operations, than their counterparts.

== Organizations and initiatives ==
The listed organisations and initiatives assist companies in pursuing sustainability accounting. For further information about why and how to report consult the following organisations.

Company/Organization	Description	Link
Sustainability Accounting Standards Board	Standardizing sustainability disclosure and effective ESG integration into investment practices.	http://www.sasb.org
The Prince's Accounting for Sustainability project (A4S)	Accounting for Sustainability was set up by the Prince of Wales in 2004 “To help ensure that sustainability – considering what we do not only in terms of ourselves and today, but also of others and tomorrow – is not just talked and worried about, but becomes embedded in organizations’ “DNA”.”	http://www.accountingforsustainability.org
Global Reporting Initiative	The Global Reporting Initiative's (GRI) provides reporting guidelines and is the most adopted framework for sustainably reporting.	http://www.globalreporting.org
World Business Council for Sustainable development	A global association with 200 companies, it provides a platform for companies to explore sustainable development.	http://www.wbcsd.org
Corporate Register	Is the largest online directory of companies that has issued a CRS, sustainability or environmental reports.	http://www.corporateregister.com
AccountAbility	AccountAbility is an international professional institute that focuses on the sustainable development, accountability and public disclosure.	http://www.accountability.org/
Carbon Disclosure Project	The Carbon Disclosure Project is an international initiative to disclosure corporate information relating climate change.	https://web.archive.org/web/20070821002227/http://www.cdproject.net/
Indian Centre for Corporate Social Responsibility (ICCSR)	ICCSR is a not for profit global advisory and training organization based in Mumbai, and engaged in promoting Corporate Social Responsibility in India and globally.	http://www.iccsr.org

== Summary and outlook ==
Nevertheless, the development of regulatory frameworks is getting closer in several countries; accountants will need to broaden their knowledge and to establish a common dialogue with social and ecological professionals. The formation of independent transdisciplinary sustainability teams to prepare and audit sustainability accounts would add credibility to the process.

Like the sections above illustrated, sustainable accounting resulted in different interpretations and intended uses of accounting. The development of a pragmatic set of tools for corporate practice is progress. Future research will address the real challenges to corporate management to develop pragmatic tools for a well described set of business situations. Current needs include the need to address the decision and control needs of corporate managers, whether or not it is the case that they are responsible for environmental, social or economic issues associated with corporate activities. The trade-offs and complementary situations need to be identified and analysed, and accounting that provides a basis for movement towards corporate and general sustainability needs to be developed.

To fall short of a convincing conceptualization will leave sustainability accounting as a broad term, with little practical usefulness. The linkage between sustainability accounting and sustainability reporting needs to be extended as well. In this context, sustainability reporting remains at an unfinished stage of development and at present is still more of a buzzword than a well defined approach. The debate remains open to challenge this goal on the premise of sustainability, its operationalisation and its accountings.

In light of these aspects, Geoff Lamberton provides a promising framework for the various forms of accounting. It draws together the five general major themes evident in social and environmental accounting research and practice, including the GRI Sustainability Accounting Guidelines. He depicts a comprehensive sustainability accounting framework which displays the complex interconnections between the various components and dimensions of sustainability. It balances the need for integration of the variety in information, measurements and reporting with the differentiated unitary information effects between the dimensions of sustainable development. The multiple units of measurement include narratives of social policy and procedures as well traditional accounting principles and practice.

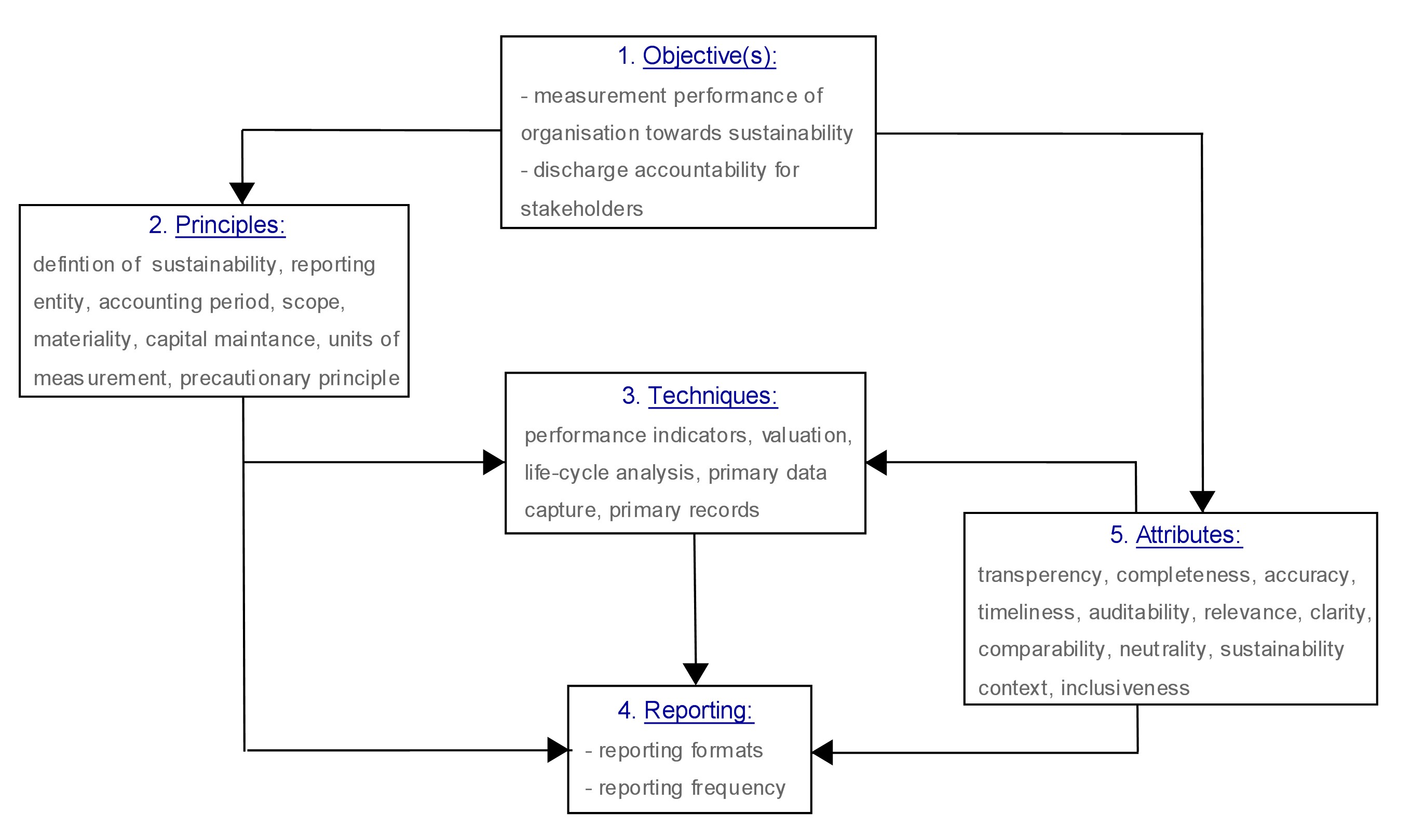
Components of Goeff Lamberton's comprehensive sustainability accounting framework

Assumptions underpinning the specification of this framework are:

1. the objective(s) of the sustainability accounting framework and the reporting model;
2. the principles underpinning the application of the model;
3. techniques like data capture tools, accounting records and measurements;
4. reports used to present information to stakeholders;
5. and qualitative attributes of the information produced and reported.

It is unrealistic to expect business to voluntarily commit the resources required for full sustainable accounting implementation. For financing the implementation of sustainability accounting and reporting one option would be to use environmental taxes to raise revenue and to discourage negative environmental impacts. Once the sustainability accounting system is established tax rates could be linked to (sustainability) performance outcomes to encourage the transition to sustainability at the organizational level.

A promising trail in a similar way may be the concept of the community welfare economics (German: "Gemeinwohl-Ökonomie") by Christian Felber. More like a framework for sustainability accounting, it is a framework or an alternative way of economics and the society in general. It suggests that business should measure its contributions of economic success according to the benefits reimbursed to the society as social and ecological factors. Similar to tax principles, the business performance is specified by an accounts of points (representing the contributions to overall well-being) and therefore the company receives (tax) benefits or support in other various form.

A further interesting example is provided by the Sustainability Flower which was developed in 2009 by an international group of prominent pioneers and innovators of the organic movement. The Flowers performance indicators were defined on the basis of the GRI Guidelines and seeks to unite four dimensions of sustainability (economic life, societal life, cultural life and ecology with six sub dimensions) in a model.

=== Criticisms ===
Despite the promising approaches to sustainability reporting, there are still concerns regarding the effectiveness of such reports. Rodriguez, Cotran, and Stewart highlight the Sustainability Accounting Standards Board (SASB) as one such report. Under SASB, certain sustainability metrics have been standardized to help investors evaluate corporate risk profiles of companies. In 2016, SASB conducted a study analyzing the current state of disclosure by observing the practices of the largest ten companies (by revenue) in each of the 79 industries. The study showed that sustainability disclosure in SEC filings varies amongst industries. This variability is likely driven by characteristics unique to the industry, such as the regulatory environment. Additionally, the study found that while most industries possess high levels of disclosure, the quality of the disclosures are low.

Adams and Frost conducted a study examining three Australian and four British companies. Adams and Frost were concerned with the completeness and authenticity of sustainability reports and the motives of the managers issuing them. The companies observed in the study have been practicing sustainability reporting for several years and are considered to be adopting best practices for sustainability reporting. Specifically, Adams and Frost examine the KPIs developed in these companies to measure performance and how these KPIs are implemented in the decision-making process and performance management. The study showed that challenges faced by companies during the KPI development process varied widely, from adapting for different geographic regions and cultures to creating targets. Lastly, the study also showed that when information was not advantageous to the organization, responsibility to the stakeholder is undermined. Adams and Frost suggest that an increase in governmental involvement may lead to adoptions that will in turn improve corporate performance. Furthermore, the increasing demand by shareholders for non-financial information is expected to serve as an impetus for greater transparency, such as the use of standardized reporting metrics. Adams and Frost state that despite the positive correlation between sustainability and financial performance, transparency must improve to meet the needs of the shareholders.

While the creation of sustainability frameworks and measurements to improve the communication between businesses and shareholders is valuable, there is still room for improvement. To help address this need, a new form of sustainability accounting known as Context-Based Sustainability (CBS) has been in development since 2005. Contrary to many other approaches to the subject, which tend to be purely incrementalist in form (i.e., they measure impacts on resources in terms of more of one type of impact this year, or less of another), CBS assesses impacts relative to sustainability standards of performance that are specific to individual organizations and explicitly tied to resource limits and thresholds in the world (social, environmental and economic). The most recent and fully elaborated implementation of CBS is the MultiCapital Scorecard method, first put forward by its creators in 2013.

== See also ==
- Balanced scorecard
- Corporate social responsibility
- Sustainable finance
