= Environmental indicator =

Measure used to evaluate environmental change

Environmental indicators are simple measures that tell us what is happening in the environment. Since the environment is very complex, indicators provide a more practical and economical way to track the state of the environment than if we attempted to record every possible variable in the environment. For example, concentrations of ozone depleting substances (ODS) in the atmosphere, tracked over time, is a good indicator with respect to the environmental issue of stratospheric ozone depletion.

Environmental indicators have been defined in different ways but common themes exist.

“An environmental indicator is a numerical value that helps provide insight into the state of the environment or human health. Indicators are developed based on quantitative measurements or statistics of environmental condition that are tracked over time. Environmental indicators can be developed and used at a wide variety of geographic scales, from local to regional to national levels.”

“A parameter or a value derived from parameters that describe the state of the environment and its impact on human beings, ecosystems and materials, the pressures on the environment, the driving forces and the responses steering that system. An indicator has gone through a selection and/or aggregation process to enable it to steer action.”

== Discussion ==
Environmental indicator criteria and frameworks have been used to help in their selection and presentation.

It can be considered, for example, that there are major subsets of environmental indicators in-line with the Pressure-State-Response model developed by the OECD. One subset of environmental indicators is the collection of ecological indicators which can include physical, biological and chemical measures such as atmospheric temperature, the concentration of ozone in the stratosphere or the number of breeding bird pairs in an area. These are also referred to as “state” indicators as their focus is on the state of the environment or conditions in the environment. A second subset is the collection of indicators that measure human activities or anthropogenic pressures, such as greenhouse gas emissions. These are also referred to as “pressure” indicators. Finally, there are indicators, such as the number of people serviced by sewage treatment, which track societal responses to environmental issues.

Environmental indicators, in turn, should be considered as a subset of sustainable development indicators which are meant to track the overall sustainability of a society with respect to its environmental, social and economic integrity and health.

A common framework spearheaded by the European Environment Agency is the “DPSIR” or “drivers, pressures, state, impact, response” framework. Drivers and pressures are indicators of the human activities and resulting pressures on the environment in the form of pollution or land-use change, for example. State and impact indicators are the resulting conditions in the environment and the implications for the health of ecosystems and humans. The response indicators measure the reaction of human society to the environmental issue. Criteria tend to focus on three key areas – scientific credibility, policy/social relevance and practical monitoring and data requirements.

An example of an environmental indicator: Trend in global temperature anomalies of the last 150 years as an indicator of climate change

Environmental indicators are used by governments, non-government organizations, community groups and research institutions to see if environmental objectives are being met, to communicate the state of the environment to the general public and decision makers and as a diagnostic tool through detecting trends in the environment.

Environmental indicators can be measured and reported at different scales. For example, a town may track air quality along with water quality and count the number of rare species of birds to estimate the health of the environment in their area. Indicators are developed for specific ecosystems, such as the Great-Lakes in North America. National governments use environmental indicators to show status and trends with respect to environmental issues of importance to their citizens.

== Use in assessment ==
Some have attempted to monitor and assess the state of the planet using indicators.

Lester Brown of the Earth Policy Institute, has said: —

Environmentally, the world is in an overshoot mode. If we use environmental indicators to evaluate our situation, then the global decline of the economy’s natural support systems - the environmental decline that will lead to economic decline and social collapse- is well underway.

Environmental indicators are also used by companies in the framework of an Environmental management system. The EU Eco-Management and Audit Scheme provides core indicators or Performance Indicator (KPIs) with which registered organizations can measure their environmental performance and monitor their continual environmental improvement against set targets.

== Audience ==
The types of indicators selected or developed should be partially based on who will be using the information from the indicators. There are generally three possible audiences to consider, each with different information needs. These audiences are: 1) technical experts and science advisors, 2) policy-makers, decision makers and resource managers, and 3) general public and media.

The technical experts and scientists will be interested in detailed and complex indicators. These indicators should have scientific validity, sensitivity, responsiveness and have data available on past conditions. The audience that includes policy-makers and resource managers will be concerned with using indicators that are directly related to evaluating policies and objectives. They require their indicators to be sensitive, responsive and have historical data available like the technical audience, but they are also looking for indicators that are cost-effective and have meaning for public awareness. Finally, the general public responds to indicators that have clear and simple messages and are meaningful to them, such as the UV index and the air quality index.

== Indicator systems and communicating them ==
Individual indicators are designed to translate complex information in a concise and easily understood manner in order to represent a particular phenomenon (e.g. ambient air quality). In contrast, indicator systems (or collections of indicators), when seen as a whole are meant to provide an assessment of the full environment domain or a major subset of it (e.g. forests).

Some indicator systems have evolved to include many indicators and require a certain level of knowledge and expertise in various disciplines to fully grasp. A number of methods have been devised in the recent past to boil down this information and allow for rapid consumption by those who do not have the time or the expertise to analyse the full set of indicators. In general these methods can be categorized as numerical aggregation (e.g. indices), short selections of indicators (e.g. core set or headline indicators), short visual assessments (e.g. arrows, traffic signals), and compelling presentations (e.g. maps or the dashboard of sustainability). Many prominent environmental indicator systems have adjusted their indicator systems to include or report solely on a limited “indicator set” (e.g. the OECD’s “Key Environmental Indicators” and the “Canadian Environmental Sustainability Indicators”)

== See also ==
- Canadian Environmental Sustainability Indicators
- Hydropower Sustainability Assessment Protocol
- State of the environment
- Environmental accounting
- Sustainability measurement
- Ecological indicator
- Eco-Management and Audit Scheme
