= Great Green Wall (Africa) =

African Union project to reverse desertification

Great Green Wall for the Sahara and the Sahel
- Logo of the Great Green Wall initiative, showing participating countries and a representation of the area in focus
- Abbreviation: GGW
- Formation: 2005; 21 years ago 2010 (Agency)
- Founder: African Union
- Location: Africa
- Website: grandemurailleverte.org

The Sahel region (brown), proposed Great Green Wall (green), and participating countries (white)

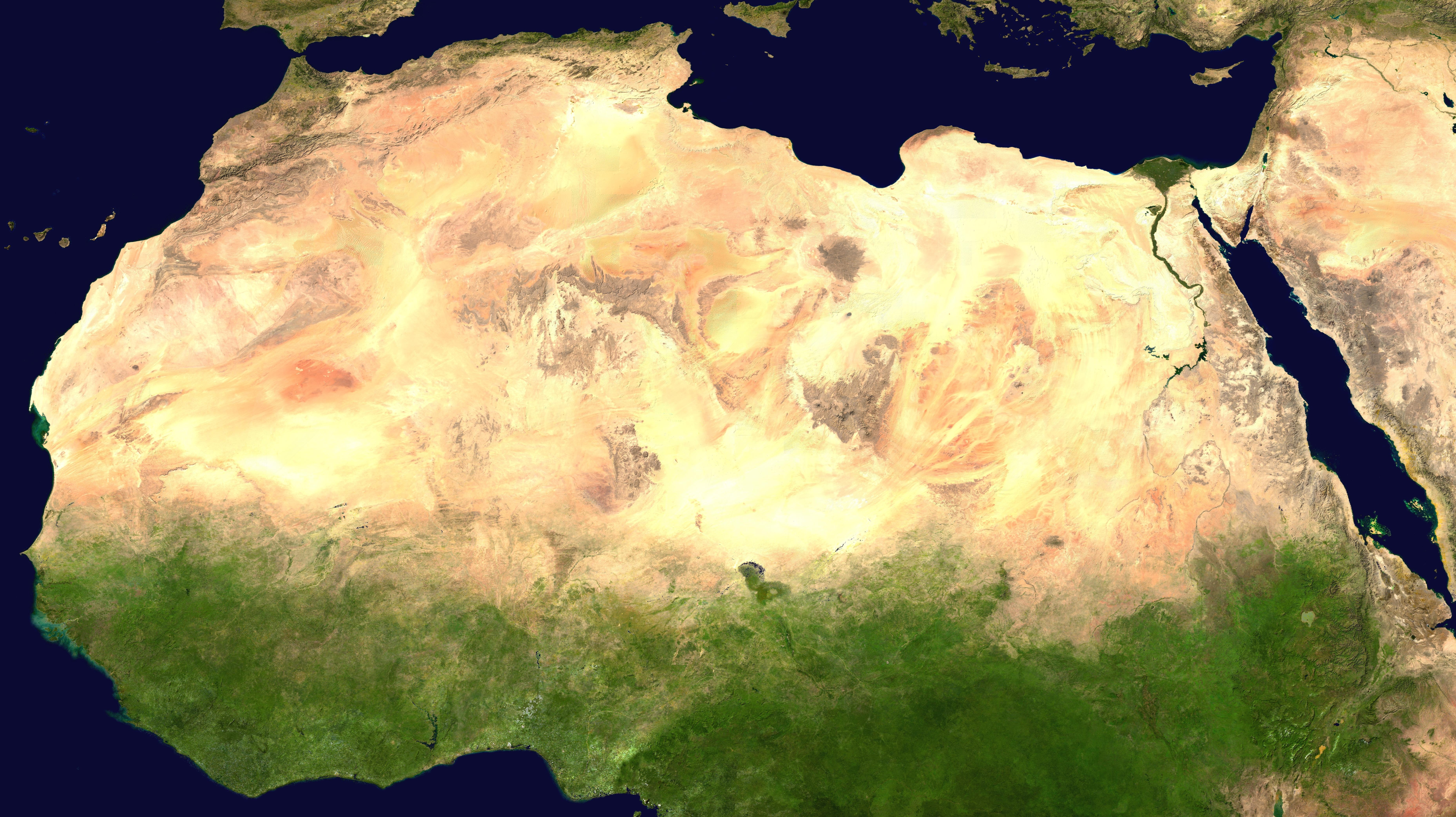
Satellite photo of the Sahara (2002)

The Great Green Wall or Great Green Wall for the Sahara and the Sahel (French: Grande Muraille Verte pour le Sahara et le Sahel; Arabic: السور الأخضر العظيم, romanized: as-Sūr al-ʾAkhḍar al-ʿAẓīm) is a project adopted by the African Union in 2007, initially conceived as a way to combat desertification in the Sahel region and hold back expansion of the Sahara Desert, by planting a wall of trees stretching across the entire Sahel from Djibouti City, Djibouti, to Dakar, Senegal. The original dimensions of the "wall" were to be 15 km (9 mi) wide and 7,775 km (4,831 mi) long, but the program expanded to encompass nations in both northern and western Africa. The concept evolved into promoting water harvesting techniques, greenery protection and improving indigenous land use techniques, aimed at creating a mosaic of green and productive landscapes across North Africa. Later it adopted the view that desert boundaries change based on rainfall variations.

The ongoing goal of the project is to restore 100 million hectares (250 million acres) of degraded land, capture 250 million tonnes of carbon dioxide, and create 10 million jobs in the process, all by 2030.

The project is a response to the combined effect of natural resources degradation and drought in rural areas. It seeks to help communities mitigate and adapt to climate change as well as improve food security.

== History ==
In the 1950s British explorer Richard St. Barbe Baker made an expedition in the Sahara. During St. Barbe's 40,000-kilometre (25,000 mi) expedition he proposed a "Green front" to act as a 50-kilometre-deep (30 mi) tree buffer to contain the expanding desert. The idea re-emerged in 2002, at the special summit in N'Djamena, the capital of Chad, on the occasion of World Day to Combat Desertification and Drought. It was approved by the Conference of Leaders and Heads of States members of the Community of Sahel-Saharan States during their seventh ordinary session held in Ouagadougou, the capital of Burkina Faso, on 1–2 June 2005. The African Union endorsed it in 2007 as the Great Green Wall for the Sahara and the Sahel Initiative (GGWSSI).

Lessons learnt from the Algerian Green Dam and the Green Wall of China led to an integrated multi-sectoral approach. Originally a tree planting initiative, the project evolved into a development programming tool. In 2007, the Conference of Heads of State and Government (CHSG) directed the project to tackle the social, economic and environmental impacts of land degradation and desertification. The countries Burkina Faso, Djibouti, Eritrea, Ethiopia, Mali, Mauritania, Niger, Nigeria, Senegal, Sudan and Chad thereafter created the Panafrican Agency of the Great Green Wall (PAGGW).

A harmonised regional strategy was adopted in September 2012 by the African Ministerial Conference on Environment (AMCEN). According to AMCEN, the Great Green Wall is a flagship program that will contribute to the goal of the United Nations Conference on Sustainable Development, or RIO+20, of "a land degradation neutral world".

In 2014, the European Union and the United Nations Food and Agriculture Organization, in collaboration with African and other regional partners, launched the Action Against Desertification program to build on the GGWSSI. Nigeria created an interim agency to support GGW development.

Since 2014, the eco-friendly search engine Ecosia has been partnered with the local population in Burkina Faso. Ecosia spread its campaign to Ethiopia in 2017 and to Senegal the following year.

According to Ecosia, it has planted over 15,117,046 trees and 14,137 ha (34,930 acres) were restored in Burkina Faso; in Senegal, it planted over 1,424,748 trees, restored 300 ha (740 acres), and planted over 9,963,757 trees; in Ethiopia, it has restored 3,609 ha (8,920 acres) as of September 2021.

Drylands Monitoring Week (2015) assessed the state of dryland measurement and initiated collaboration toward large-scale, comprehensive monitoring.

Planning (including choices of vegetation and work with local populations) and plantings/land restoration followed (including in Ethiopia, Senegal, Nigeria and Sudan).

In 2016, 21 countries had projects related to the GGW, including farmer-supported natural regeneration.

Bare land restoration has been successfully demonstrated in Burkina Faso, although security is an issue in the face of terrorist activity.

In September 2017, the BBC reported that progress was best in Senegal.

== Progress ==
In March 2019, 15% of the wall was complete with significant gains made in Nigeria, Senegal and Ethiopia. In Senegal, over 11 million trees had been planted. Nigeria has restored 4.9 million ha (12 million acres; 49,000 km^{2}) of degraded land and Ethiopia has reclaimed 15 million ha (37 million acres; 150,000 km^{2}).

On the occasion of the fifteenth anniversary of the launch of the program, a report was commissioned by the United Nations Convention to Combat Desertification (UNCCD) and published on September 7, 2020. It was reported that the Great Green Wall had only covered 4% of the planned area, with only 4 million hectares (9.8 million acres) planted. Ethiopia has had the most success with 5.5 billion seedlings planted, but Chad has only planted 1.1 million. Doubt was raised over the survival rate of the 12 million trees planted in Senegal.

In January 2021, the project received a boost at the One Planet Summit, where its partners pledged USD 14.3 billion to launch the Great Green Wall Accelerator, aimed at facilitating the collaboration and coordination among donors and involved stakeholders across 11 countries. As of March 2023, $2.5 billion of that pledge had been disbursed.

According to the second edition of the Global Land Outlook (GLO2) published by the (UNCCD) in April of 2022 one reason the project has experienced implementation challenges is the political risk associated with investing in more fragile nations as well as the fact that many "GGW projects generate low economic returns compared to the significant environmental and social benefits accrued that often have little or no market value." Furthermore, international donors seem to favor investing in more stable nations picking and choosing which projects they will fund and leaving nations with less stable governments behind.

As of 2023, about 18 million hectares, or 18% of the target had been restored. The estimated $33 billion to fund the project experienced unfulfilled promises, delays and poor coordination.
As of 2024, about 30 million hectares had been restored, completing 30% of the target.

Non-profit Tree Aid partnered with the International Olympic Committee (IOC) to grow an “Olympic forest” in Mali and Senegal to grow more than 589,000 trees. The team selected 55 woody/herbaceous indigenous species with economic value, including baobab (Adansonia digitata), balanite (Balanites aegyptiaca), African crabwood (Carapa procera), gum acacia (Senegalia senegal), tamarind (Tamarindus indica), and African grape (Lannea microcarpa). Pilot restorers planted 2,235 hectares, creating opportunities for sustainable income for 32,000 people. Wild-collected seeds were added to the seed.

== Monitoring ==
Little monitoring and record keeping have been conducted, even including where projects have occurred.

The Sudan and South Sudan insurgencies further complicated monitoring. Locusts have damaged multiple projects.

== Criticism ==
The Great Green Wall program has received criticism for having colonial origins, specifically relating to the use of the term 'desertification', which stems from French colonial influence. It has also been criticised for receiving predominantly European funding, which can be seen as a form of neocolonialism. Further criticism of the GGW initiative also notes that the strategies deployed by the project encourage sedentarization and population control: two colonial-era interventions that are perpetuated by the top-down focus of the GGW.

== Partners ==
The Initiative brings together more than 20 countries, including Algeria, Burkina Faso, Benin, Chad, Cape Verde, Djibouti, Egypt, Ethiopia, Libya, Mali, Mauritania, Niger, Nigeria, Senegal, Somalia, Sudan, The Gambia, and Tunisia.

Regional and international partners include:

- African Forest Forum (AFF)
- African Union Commission (AUC)
- Association for the promotion of education and training abroad (APEFE)
- Arab Maghreb Union (UMA)
- Community of Sahel-Saharan States (CEN-SAD)
- Economic Community of West African States (ECOWAS)
- European Union (EU)
- Food and Agriculture Organization of the United Nations (FAO)
- Global Mechanism of the United Nations Convention to Combat Desertification (GM-UNCCD)
- Intergovernmental Authority on Development in Eastern Africa (IGAD)
- MDG Center for West and Central Africa (MDG-WCA)
- Pan African Farmers Organization (PAFO)
- Panafrican Agency of the Great Green Wall (PAGGW)
- Permanent Interstate Committee for Drought Control in the Sahel (CILSS)
- Sahara and Sahel Observatory (OSS)
- Secretariat of the United Nations Convention to Combat Desertification (UNCCD-Secretariat)
- United Nations Development Programme–Drylands, Development Center (UNDP-DDC)
- United Nations Environment Programme (UNEP)
- United Nations Environment Programme–World Conservation Monitoring Center (UNEP-WCMC)
- Walloon Region of Belgium, Wallonie-Bruxelles International
- World Agroforestry Centre (ICRAF)
- World Overview of Conservation Approaches and Technologies (WOCAT)
- The World Bank

== Major principles ==
The project encompasses the Saharan strip, north and south borders, including Saharan oases and enclaves.

The GGWSSI intends to strengthen existing mechanisms (such as Comprehensive African Agricultural Development Program, Environmental Program (CAADP) of New Partnership for Africa's Development (NEPAD), regional, sub-regional, and national action programmes to combat desertification) to improve their efficiency through synergy and coordination activities.

The Regional Harmonised Strategy emphasizes partnerships between stakeholders, integration into existing programmes, sharing of lessons learnt (especially through South-South cooperation and technology transfer), local participation and ownership of actions and developing more integrated and global planning.

The $8-billion project intends to restore 100 million hectares (250 million acres; 1 million km^{2}) of degraded land by 2030, which would create 350,000 rural jobs and absorb 250 million tonnes (250 million long tons; 280 million short tons) of CO_{2} from the atmosphere.

== Risk of collapse ==
As of 2023, the Great Green Wall was reported as "facing the risk of collapse" due to terrorist threats, absence of political leadership, and insufficient funding. “The Sahel countries have not allocated any spending in their budgets for this project. They are only waiting on funding from abroad, whether from the European Union, the African Union, or others,” said Issa Garba, an environmental activist from Niger, who also described the 2030 guideline as an unattainable goal. Amid the existing stagnation, a growing number of voices have called for scrapping the project.

== See also ==
- Afforestation – Establishment of trees where there were none previously
- Algerian Green Dam, an Algerian anti-desertification program started in 1970
- Three-North Shelter Forest Program, a Chinese anti-desertification program started in 1978
- The Great Green Wall of Aravalli, a 1,600 km long and 5 km wide green ecological corridor of India
- The Great Hedge of India, a historic inland customs border

== Bibliography ==
- Grande Muraille Verte. "Convention creating the Pan-African Agency for the Great Green Wall" (PDF). www.grandemurailleverte.org.
