= Canadian Environmental Sustainability Indicators =

Canadian Environmental Sustainability Indicators has broadened in scope to include indicators that span the three pillars of sustainability. National NGOs, as well as the Government of Canada, create and maintain Sustainability indicators.

Historically Canadian Environmental Sustainability Indicators (CESI) was the name of a Government of Canada program that provides data and information to track Canada's performance on environmental sustainability issues including climate change and air quality, water quality and availability, and protecting nature. Their environmental indicators are based on objective and comprehensive information and convey environmental trends.

== Environment and Climate Change Canada ==
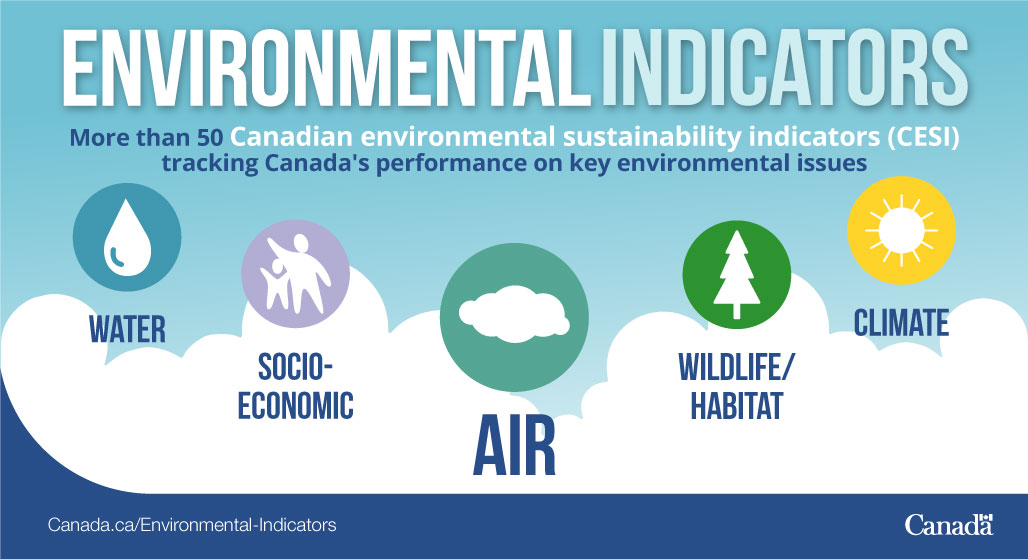
CESI banner

The indicators are prepared with the support of other federal government departments, such as Health Canada, Statistics Canada, Natural Resources Canada, Agriculture and Agri-Food Canada, as well as provincial and territorial government departments. Designed to be relevant to the Government's policy, the indicators are built on rigorous methodology and high quality, regularly available data from surveys and monitoring networks.

The CESI website presence ensures that national, regional, local and international trends are readily accessible and transparently presented to all Canadians through the use of graphics, explanatory text, interactive maps and downloadable data. Indicator results are linked to their key social and economic drivers and information is provided on how the issues are influenced by consumers, businesses and governments. Each indicator is accompanied by a technical explanation of its calculation.

CESI is the prime instrument to measure the progress of the Federal Sustainable Development Strategy and responds to Environment Canada's commitments under the Canadian Environmental Protection Act and the Department of the Environment Act to report to Canadians on the state of the environment.

== Green Score City Index ==
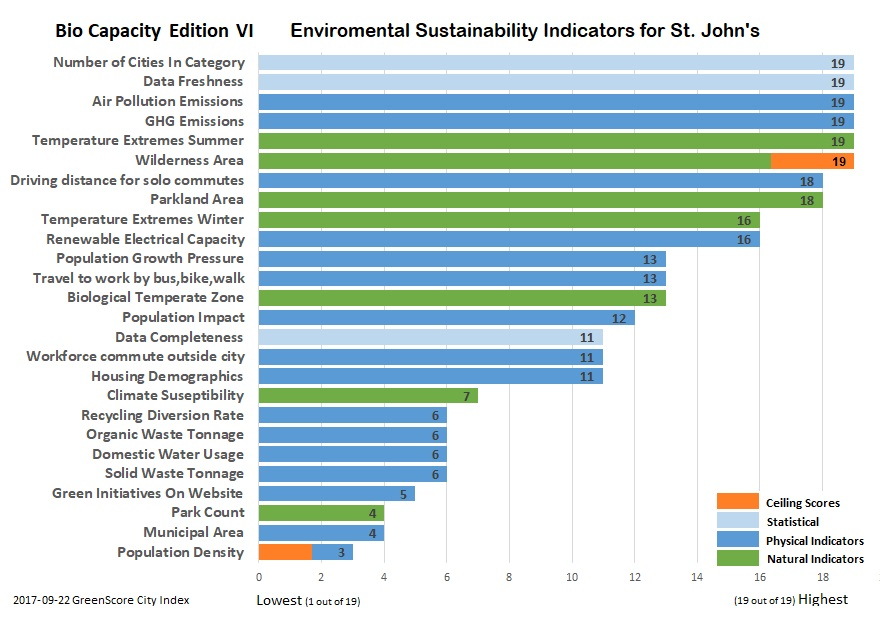
GSCI indicator sample

This municipal index uses Canadian environmental sustainability indicator data sources to develop indicators that are specific to the municipalities they measure. These indicators are prepared with support from the Canadian government, provincial governments, regional authorities, and participating municipalities. Most of the data used to calculate the comparative indicators exist outside of the jurisdictional boundaries of municipalities.

The Green Score City Index is an ongoing empirical study of the anthropogenic impacts cities exert on land and ecosystems within city limits. Indicators measure the effects of human activity on the underlying land inside city limits. It uses a broad range of indicators that cover the three pillars of sustainability. It uses comparative indicators that are developed for the purpose of comparing cities with each other to discover strengths and weaknesses; this is what makes it a good tool for seeing the big picture.

== ICLEI Canada ==
Develops national programs with a local impact. Their network is made up of the municipalities that participate in our programs and activities, representing Canada’s municipalities from the smallest towns to the largest cities. It also includes an implementation of partners, funders, and peers who help deliver a range of programs and activities.

ICLEI has created international guidelines for the creation of environmental sustainability indicators. Performance indicators are used across a variety of sectors to improve understanding of a particular situation, to assess progress towards a set of goals or objectives, and to make predictions regarding future performance. The purpose of this series of sector-focused case studies was to examine available indicators from a variety of sectors and assess their ability to contribute to the measurement of adaptation actions both in terms of effectiveness and progress on implementation. Developed by ICLEI Canada and the Clean Air Partnership, this project was funded by Natural Resources Canada’s Enhancing Competitiveness in a Changing Climate Program.

== History ==
The indicators are the culmination of a long line of national-level environmental indicator work and state of the environment reporting in Canada. Three large 5-year state-of-environment reports were prepared by Environment Canada between 1985 and 1996 and the National Environmental Indicators Series saw reports and bulletins released from 1990 to 2003.

Environment Canada's focus turned to a consolidated May 2003 proposal from the National Round Table on Environment and the Economy. The CESI initiative provided indicators to track Canada's performance on three issues of concern to Canadians: air quality, water quality and greenhouse gas emissions. More recent releases include new indicators on protecting nature.

Environmental indicators provide a simple way to convey complex information on the environment, much like the gross domestic product, the consumer price index and the unemployment rate do for the economy. Environmental indicator programs are prevalent internationally (e.g. the European Environment Agency)and within Canada (e.g. Quebec)

In 2015 Green Score Canada created a city index pilot project with the participation from many of the 50 municipalities studied which included collaboration from provincial and federal government stakeholders. The index started with 15 Canadian environmental sustainability indicators. The index has been continuously developed and published since 2016.

== See also ==
- Environmental indicator
- State of the environment
- Sustainability measurement
- Ecological indicator
