= Genuine progress indicator =

Metric for supplementing economic or well-being indicators

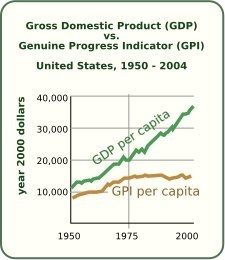

Genuine progress indicator (GPI) is a metric that has been suggested to replace, or supplement, gross domestic product (GDP). The GPI is designed to take fuller account of the well-being of a nation, only a part of which pertains to the size of the nation's economy, by incorporating environmental and social factors which are not measured by GDP. For instance, some models of GPI decrease in value when the poverty rate increases. The GPI separates the concept of societal progress from economic growth.

The GPI is used in ecological economics, "green" economics, sustainability and more inclusive types of economics. It factors in environmental and carbon footprints that businesses produce or eliminate, including in the forms of resource depletion, pollution and long-term environmental damage. GDP is increased twice when pollution is created, since it increases once upon creation (as a side-effect of some valuable process) and again when the pollution is cleaned up; in contrast, GPI counts the initial pollution as a loss rather than a gain, generally equal to the amount it will cost to clean up later plus the cost of any negative impact the pollution will have in the meantime. While quantifying costs and benefits of these environmental and social externalities is a difficult task, "Earthster-type databases could bring more precision and currency to GPI's metrics." It has been noted that such data may also be embraced by those who attempt to "internalize externalities" by making companies pay the costs of the pollution they create (rather than having the government or society at large bear those costs) "by taxing their goods proportionally to their negative ecological and social impacts".

GPI is an attempt to measure whether the environmental impact and social costs of economic production and consumption in a country are negative or positive factors in overall health and well-being. By accounting for the costs borne by the society as a whole to repair or control pollution and poverty, GPI balances GDP spending against external costs. GPI advocates claim that it can more reliably measure economic progress, as it distinguishes between the overall "shift in the 'value basis' of a product, adding its ecological impacts into the equation". Comparatively speaking, the relationship between GDP and GPI is analogous to the relationship between the gross profit of a company and the net profit; the net profit is the gross profit minus the costs incurred, while the GPI is the GDP (value of all goods and services produced) minus the environmental and social costs. Accordingly, the GPI will be zero if the financial costs of poverty and pollution equal the financial gains in production of goods and services, all other factors being constant.

== Motivations ==
Some economists assess progress in an economy's welfare by comparing its gross domestic product over time — that is, by adding up the annual dollar value of all goods and services produced within a country over successive years. However, GDP was not intended to be used for such purpose. It is prone to productivism or consumerism, over-valuing production and consumption of goods, and not reflecting improvement in human well-being. It also does not distinguish between money spent for new production and money spent to repair negative outcomes from previous expenditure. For example, it would treat as equivalent one million dollars spent to build new homes and one million dollars spent in aid relief to those whose homes have been destroyed, despite these expenditures arguably not representing the same kind of progress. This is relevant for example when considering the true costs of development that destroys wetlands and hence exacerbates flood damages. Simon Kuznets, the inventor of the concept of GDP, noted in his first report to the US Congress in 1934:

the welfare of a nation can scarcely be inferred from a measure of national income.

In 1962, he also wrote:

Distinctions must be kept in mind between quantity and quality of growth, between costs and returns, and between the short and long run... Goals for more growth should specify more growth of what and for what.

Some have argued that an adequate measure must also take into account ecological yield and the ability of nature to provide services, and that these things are part of a more inclusive ideal of progress, which transcends the traditional focus on raw industrial production.

== Theoretical foundation ==
The need for a GPI to supplement indicators such as GDP was highlighted by analyses of uneconomic growth in the 1980s, notably that of Marilyn Waring, who studied biases in the UN System of National Accounts.

By the early 1990s, there was a consensus in human development theory and ecological economics that growth in money supply was actually reflective of a loss of well-being: that shortfalls in essential natural and social services were being paid for in cash and that this was expanding the economy but degrading life.

The matter remains controversial and is a main issue between advocates of green economics and neoclassical economics. Neoclassical economists understand the limitations of GDP for measuring human well-being but nevertheless regard GDP as an important, though imperfect, measure of economic output and would be wary of too close an identification of GDP growth with aggregate human welfare. However, GDP tends to be reported as synonymous with economic progress by journalists and politicians, and the GPI seeks to correct this shorthand by providing a more encompassing measure.

Some economists, notably Herman Daly, John B. Cobb and Philip Lawn, have asserted that a country's growth, increased goods production, and expanding services have both costs and benefits, not just the benefits that contribute to GDP. They assert that, in some situations, expanded production facilities damage the health, culture, and welfare of people. Growth that was in excess of sustainable norms (e.g., of ecological yield) had to be considered to be uneconomic. According to the "threshold hypothesis", developed by Manfred Max-Neef, "when macroeconomic systems expand beyond a certain size, the additional benefits of growth are exceeded by the attendant costs" (Max-Neef, 1995). This hypothesis is borne out in data comparing GDP/capita with GPI/capita from 17 countries. The graph demonstrates that, while GDP does increase overall well-being to a point, beyond $7,000 GDP/capita the increase in GPI is reduced or remains stagnant. Similar trends can be seen when comparing GDP to life satisfaction as well as in a Gallup Poll published in 2008.

According to Lawn's model, the "costs" of economic activity include the following potential harmful effects:

- Cost of resource depletion
- Cost of crime
- Cost of ozone depletion
- Cost of family breakdown
- Cost of air, water, and noise pollution
- Loss of farmland
- Loss of wetlands

Analysis by Robert Costanza also around 1995 of nature's services and their value showed that a great deal of degradation of nature's ability to clear waste, prevent erosion, pollinate crops, etc., was being done in the name of monetary profit opportunity: this was adding to GDP but causing a great deal of long term risk in the form of mudslides, reduced yields, lost species, water pollution, etc. Such effects have been very marked in areas that suffered serious deforestation, notably Haiti, Indonesia, and some coastal mangrove regions of India and South America. Some of the worst land abuses for instance have been shrimp farming operations that destroyed mangroves, evicted families, left coastal lands salted and useless for agriculture, but generated a significant cash profit for those who were able to control the export market in shrimp. This has become a signal example to those who contest the idea that GDP growth is necessarily desirable.

GPI systems generally try to take account of these problems by incorporating sustainability: whether a country's economic activity over a year has left the country with a better or worse future possibility of repeating at least the same level of economic activity in the long run. For example, agricultural activity that uses replenishing water resources, such as river runoff, would score a higher GPI than the same level of agricultural activity that drastically lowers the water table by pumping irrigation water from wells.

=== Income vs. capital depletion ===
Hicks (1946) pointed out that the practical purpose of calculating income is to indicate the maximum amount that people can produce and consume without undermining their capacity to produce and consume the same amount in the future. From a national income perspective, it is necessary to answer the following question: "Can a nation's entire GDP be consumed without undermining its ability to produce and consume the same GDP in the future?" This question is largely ignored in contemporary economics but fits under the idea of sustainability.

== In legislative decisions ==
The best-known attempts to apply the concepts of GPI to legislative decisions are probably the GPI Atlantic, an index, not an indicator, invented by Ronald Colman for Atlantic Canada, who explicitly avoids aggregating the results obtained through research to a single number, alleging that it keeps decisions makers in the dark; the Alberta GPI created by ecological economist Mark Anielski to measure the long-term economic, social and environmental sustainability of the province of Alberta and the "environmental and sustainable development indicators" used by the Government of Canada to measure its own progress to achieving well-being goals.

The Canadian Environmental Sustainability Indicators program is an effort to justify state services in GPI terms. It assigns the Commissioner of the Environment and Sustainable Development, an officer in the Auditor-General of Canada's office, to perform the analysis and report to the House of Commons. However, Canada continues to state its overall budgetary targets in terms of reducing its debt to GDP ratio, which implies that GDP increase and debt reduction in some combination are its main priorities.

In the European Union (EU) the Metropole efforts and the London Health Observatory methods are equivalents focused mostly on urban lifestyle.

The EU and Canadian efforts are among the most advanced in any of the G8 or OECD nations, but there are parallel efforts to measure quality of life or standard of living in health (not strictly wealth) terms in all developed nations. This has also been a recent focus of the labour movement.

== Calculation ==
The calculation of GPI presented in the simplified form is the following:

GPI = A + B - C - D + I

A is income weighted private consumption

B is value of non-market services generating welfare

C is private defensive cost of natural deterioration

D is cost of deterioration of nature and natural resources

I is increase in capital stock and balance of international trade

The GPI indicator is based on the concept of sustainable income, presented by economist John Hicks (1948). The sustainable income is the amount a person or an economy can consume during one period without decreasing his or her consumption during the next period. In the same manner, GPI depicts the state of welfare in the society by taking into account the ability to maintain welfare on at least the same level in the future.

== Components ==
The Genuine Progress Indicator is measured by 26 indicators which can be divided into three main categories: Economic, Environmental, and Social. Some regions, nations, or states may adjust the verbiage slightly to accommodate their particular scenario. For example, the GPI template uses the phrase "Carbon Dioxide Emissions Damage" whereas the state of Maryland uses "Cost of Climate Change" because it also accounts for other greenhouse gases (GHG) such as methane and nitrous oxide.

+/-	Indicator	Brief explanation
Economic		
+	Personal Consumption Expenditures	The bulk of GDP as well, consumption informs the baseline from which the rest of the indicators will be added or subtracted.
÷	Income Inequality	Using the Gini index, published by World Bank, and the Income Distribution Index (IDI), its relative change over time.
(PCE/IDI)*100	Adjusted Personal Consumption	Formula=(Personal consumption/IDI) x 100. Forms the base number from which the remaining indicators are added or subtracted.
-	Cost of Consumer Durables	Calculated as a cost to avoid double counting the value provided by the durables themselves.
+	Value of Consumer Durables	Household appliances, cars, etc. are not used up in one year and are considered a part of household capital. Their value is depreciated over a number of years.
-	Cost of Underemployment	Encompasses the chronically unemployed, discouraged workers, involuntary part-time workers and others with work-life restraints (lack of childcare or transportation).
+/-	Net Capital Investment	Capital investment in foreign markets minus incoming investments from other countries. If lending (+) if borrowing (-).
Environmental		
-	Cost of Water Pollution	Damage to water quality from things such as chemicals or nutrients, and the costs of erosion/sedimentation in waterways.
-	Cost of Air Pollution	Includes damage to vegetation, degradation of materials, cost of clean-up from soot or acid rain, and resulting reduced property values, wage differentials and aesthetics.
-	Cost of Noise Pollution	Noise from traffic and factories can cause hearing loss and sleep deprivation.
-	Loss of Wetlands	Valuates the services given up when wetlands are lost to development i.e. buffering of weather, habitat, water purification.
-	Loss of farmland, soil quality or degradation	Due to urbanization, soil erosion and compaction. This indicator is measured cumulatively to account for all years of production lost as it compromises self-sufficient food supply.
-	Loss of Primary Forest and damage from logging roads	Loss of biodiversity, soil quality, water purification, carbon sequestration, recreation etc. Cumulative affect year over year.
-	CO_{2} Emissions	Increases in severe weather is causing billions in damages. A value of US$93/metric ton of CO2 emitted is used, based on a meta-analysis study by Richard Tol (2005) of 103 separate studies of costs of economic damages.
-	Cost of Ozone Depletion	Our protective layer in the atmosphere. Depletion can lead to increased cases of cancer, cataracts and plant decline. Weighed at US$49,669/ton
-	Depletion of Non-Renewables	These cannot be renewed in a lifetime. Depletion is measured against cost of implementing and substituting with renewable resources.
Social		
+	Value of Housework and Parenting	Child care, repairs and maintenance are valued equivalent to the amount a household would have to pay for the service.
-	Cost of Family Changes	Social dysfunction presents itself early in family life. Care is taken to avoid double counting goods and services duplicated due to split-parent households.
-	Cost of Crime	Medical expenses, property damages, psychological care and security measures to prevent crime are all included in this indicator.
-	Cost of Household Pollution Abatement	Cost to residents to clean the air and water in their own household i.e. air and water filters.
+	Value of Volunteer Work	Valued as a contribution to social welfare. Neighborhoods and communities can find an informal safety net through their peers and volunteer work.
-	Loss of Leisure Time	Compared to 1969 hours of leisure. Recognizes that increased output of goods and services can lead to loss of valuable leisure time for family, chores or otherwise.
+	Value of Higher Education	Accounts for the contribution resulting knowledge, productivity, civic engagement, savings, and health; a "social spillover," set to $16,000 per year.
+	Value of Highways and Streets	Annual value of services contributed from the use of streets & highways. Valued at 7.5% of net stock of local, state and federal highways.
-	Cost of Commuting	Money spent to pay for the transportation and time lost in transit as opposed to other more enjoyable activities.
-	Cost of Auto Accidents	Damage and loss as a result of traffic accidents. Increased traffic densities are a direct result of industrialization and wealth accumulation.

== Development in the United States ==
Non-profit organizations and universities have measured the GPI of Vermont, Maryland, Colorado, Ohio, and Utah. These efforts have incited government action in some states. As of 2014, Vermont, Maryland, Washington and Hawaiʻi have passed state government initiatives to consider GPI in budgeting decisions, with a focus on long-term cost and benefits. Hawaiʻi's GPI spans the years from 2000 to 2020 and will be updated annually.

In 2009, the state of Maryland formed a coalition of representatives from several state government departments in search of a metric that would factor social well-being into the more traditional gross product indicators of the economy. The metric would help determine the sustainability of growth and economic progress against social and environmental factors typically left out of national indicators. The GPI was chosen as a comprehensive measure of sustainability as it has a well-accepted scientific methodology that can be adopted by other states and compared over time. Maryland's GPI trends are comparable to other states and nations that have measured their GPI in that gross state product (GSP) and GPI have diverged over the past four decades where GSP has increased more rapidly than GPI. While economic elements of GPI have increased overall (with a significant drop off during the Great Recession), social well-being has stagnated, with any values added being cancelled out by costs deducted, and environmental indicators, while improving slightly, are always considered costs. Combined, these elements bring the GPI below GSP. However, Maryland's GPI did increase by two points from 2010 to 2011.

The calculation methodology of GPI was first developed and published in 1995 by Redefining Progress and applied to US data from 1950 to 1994. The original work on the GPI in 1995 was a modification of the 1994 version of the Index of Sustainable Economic Welfare in Daly and Cobb. Results showed that GDP increased substantially from 1950 to 1994. Over the same period, the GPI stagnated. Thus, according to GPI theory, economic growth in the US, i.e., the growth of GDP, did not increase the welfare of the people over that 44 year period. So far, GPI time-series have been calculated for the US and Australia as well as for several of their states. In addition, GPI has been calculated for Austria, Canada, Chile, France, Finland, Italy, the Netherlands, Scotland, and the rest of the UK.

== Development in Finland ==
The GPI time-series 1945 to 2011 for Finland have been calculated by Statistics Finland. The calculation closely followed the US methodology. The results show that in the 1970s and 1980s economic growth, as measured by GDP, clearly increased welfare, measured by the GPI. After the economic recession of the early-1990s the GDP continued to grow, but the GPI stayed on a lower level. This indicates a widening gap between the trends of GDP and GPI that began in the early-1990s. In the 1990s and 2000s the growth of GDP has not benefited the average Finn. If measured by GPI, sustainable economic welfare has actually decreased due to environmental hazards that have accumulated in the environment. The Finnish GPI time series have been updated by Dr Jukka Hoffrén at Statistics Finland.

Within EU's Interreg IV C FRESH Project (Forwarding Regional Environmental Sustainable Hierarchies) GPI time-series were calculated to Päijät-Häme, Kainuu and South-Ostrobotnia (Etelä-Pohjanmaa) regions in 2009–2010. During 2011 these calculations were completed with GPI calculations for the Lappland, Northern Ostrobothnia (Pohjois-Pohjanmaa) and Central-Ostrobothnia (Keski-Pohjanmaa) regions.

== Criticism ==
GPI considers some types of production to have a negative impact upon being able to continue some types of production. GDP measures the entirety of production at a given time. GDP is relatively straightforward to measure compared to GPI. Competing measures like GPI define well-being, which are arguably impossible to define. Therefore, opponents of GPI claim that GPI cannot function to measure the goals of a diverse, plural society. Supporters of GDP as a measure of societal well-being claim that competing measures such as GPI are more vulnerable to political manipulation.

Finnish economists Mika Maliranta and Niku Määttänen write that the problem of alternative development indexes is their attempt to combine things that are incommensurable. It is hard to say what they exactly indicate and difficult to make decisions based on them. They can be compared to an indicator that shows the mean of a car's velocity and the amount of fuel left.

They add that it indeed seems as if the economy has to grow in order for the people to even remain as happy as they are at present. In Japan, for example, the degree of happiness expressed by the citizens in polls has been declining since the early 1990s, the period when Japan's economic growth stagnated.

== Supporting countries and groups ==
- Canada planning applications. GDP has functioned as an "income sheet". GPI will function as a "balance sheet," taking into consideration that some income sources are very costly and contribute a negative profit overall.
- Beyond GDP is an initiative of the European Union, Club of Rome, WWF and OECD.
- Redefining Progress. Reports and analyses. A non-profit organization with headquarters in Oakland, California.
- Gross National Happiness USA has commissioned studies and advocated adoption of GPI in the United States.

== GPI and GPI-type studies completed ==
Indicator name	Region	Beginning year of study	End year of study	Year of publication	Authors
MEW -(A/S)	United States of America	1929	1965	1972	Nordhaus and Tobin
ISEW	United States of America	1951	1986, 1992	1989, 1994	Daly and Cobb
ISEW	Germany	1950	1990	1994	Diefenbacher
ISEW	Scotland, United Kingdom	1980	1991	1994	Moffatt and Wilson
ISEW	Netherlands	1950	1992	1995	Oegema and Rosenberg
ISEW	Netherlands	1950	1992	1995	Rosenberg, Oegema, Bovy
ISEW	Sweden	1950	1992	1996	Jackson and Stymne
ISEW	Austria	1955	1992	1997	Stockhammer et al.
ISEW	United Kingdom	1950	1996	1997	Jackson, et al.
ISEW	Austria	1955	1992	1997	Stockhammer, Hochreiter, Obermayr, Steiner
ISEW	Italy	1960	1991	1998	Giogio Guenno, Silvia Tiezzi
ISEW	Chile	1965	1995	1999	Castañeda
GPI	United States of America	1950	1994	1995	Cobb, Halstead, Rowe
GPI	United States of America	1950	1996	1999	Cobb, Goodman, Wackernagel
GPI	Australia	1950	1996	1999	Clive Hamilton
SNBI	Australia	1966	1967	1999	Lawn and Sanders
SNBI	Australia	1994	1995	1999	Lawn and Sanders
ISEW	Scotland, United Kingdom	1980	1993	1999	Hanley
GPI	Australia	1950	2000	2000	Hamilton and Dennis
GPI	Minnesota	1960	1995	2000	Minnesota Planning Agency
GPI	Alberta, Canada	1961	1999	2001	Mark Anielski
ISEW	Czech Republic	1988	1998	2002	Scasny
ISEW	Poland	1980	1997	2003	Gil and Sleszynski
ISEW	Wales, United Kingdom	1990	2000	2003	Matthews, Williams, Roberts, Munday
GPI	United States of America	1950	2002	2004	Venetoulis and Cobb
GPI	San Francisco Bay Area	2000	2000	2004	Venetoulis and Cobb
GPI	Vermont: Chittenden County and Burlington	1950	2000	2004	Costanza, Erickson et al.
ISEW	Thailand	1975	1999	2005	Matthew Clarke, Sardar M.N. Islam
GPI	Colombia	1976	2003	2006	Sánchez et al.
GPI	United States of America	1950	2004	2006	John Talberth, Clifford Cobb, and Noah Slattery
ISEW	Siena, Italy	1999	1999	2006	Pulselli, Ciampalini, Tiezzi, Zappia
ISEW	Belgium	1970	2000	2006	Brent Bleys
GPI	Victoria, Australia	1986	2003	2006	Clarke and Lawn
ISEW	Mexico	1993	2005	2007	Castillo López A.
ISEW	Netherlands	1971	2004	2007	Brent Bleys
IBES/ISEW	Puerto Rico	1970	2006	2007	Alameda-Lozada and Diaz-Rodriguez
GPI	China (4 regions)	1991	2001	2007	Zongguo Wen, Kunmin Zhanf, Bin Du, Yadong Li, Wei Li
GPI	Northern Vermont (7 counties)	1950	2000	2007	Bagstad and Ceroni
ISEW	Belgium	1970	2004	2008	Brent Bleys
R-ISEW	England (regions)	1994	2005	2008	Tim Jackson, Nat McBride, Saamah Abdallah and Nic Marks
ISEW	France	1990	2002	2008	Nourry
ISEW	Modena and Rimini, Italy	?	?	2008	Pulselli, F.M., Tiezzi, E., Marchettini, N., Bastiononi, S.
GPI	India	1987	2003	2008	Ed: Philip Lawn and Matthew Clarke (Book)
GPI	Australia	1967	2006	2008	Ed: Philip Lawn and Matthew Clarke (Book)
GPI	New Zealand	1970	2005	2008	Ed: Philip Lawn and Matthew Clarke (Book)
GPI	Japan	1970	2003	2008	Ed: Philip Lawn and Matthew Clarke (Book)
GPI	China	1970	2005	2008	Ed: Philip Lawn and Matthew Clarke (Book)
GPI	Thailand	1975	2004	2008	Ed: Philip Lawn and Matthew Clarke (Book)
GPI	Vietnam	1992	2004	2008	Ed: Philip Lawn and Matthew Clarke (Book)
Edmonton Wellbeing Index	Edmonton, Canada	1981	2008	2009	Anielski and Johannessen
ISEW	Tuscany, Italy	1971	2006	2009	Pulselli, F., Bravi, M., Tiezzi, E.
GPI	Ukraine	2000	2007	2010	Danilishin & Veklich
ISEW	Ecuador	2001	2010	2011	ANDRÉS PAÚL CORDERO SANMARTÍN
GPI	Utah	1990	2007	2011	Berik, G. and E. Gaddis
GPI	Baltimore City, County, and the State of Maryland	1950	2005	2011	Posner, S. and R. Costanza
GPI	Vermont	1960	2010	2011	Zencey, Eric, Sebastian Castro, Marigo Farr, Mark Isselhardt, Brian Kelly, Katharine Lucas, Julie Nash, Matt Pescatore, Meagan Pharis, Vinson Pierce, Tarah Rose, Daniel Sanchez, Aaron Witham, Zach Zimmerman.
GPI	Maryland	1950	2004	2012	MacGuire, S., S. Posner, H. Haake
ISEW	Netherlands	1970	2010	2012	Bob van Moerkerk
GPI	Northern Ohio	1990	2005	2012	Kenneth Bagstad and Md Rumi Shammin
ISEW	Flanders, Belgium	1990	2009	2013	Brent Bleys
GPI	Vermont	1960	2011	2013	Jon D. Erickson, Eric Zencey, Matthew J. Burke, Sam Carlson, and Zachary Zimmerman
GPI	Austria	1955	1992	2013	Kubiszewski, Costanza, Franco, Lawn, Talberth, Jackson, Aylmer
GPI	Belgium	1970	2005	2013	Kubiszewski, Costanza, Franco, Lawn, Talberth, Jackson, Aylmer
GPI	Netherlands	1950	1992	2013	Kubiszewski, Costanza, Franco, Lawn, Talberth, Jackson, Aylmer
GPI	Poland	1980	1998	2013	Kubiszewski, Costanza, Franco, Lawn, Talberth, Jackson, Aylmer
GPI	Italy	1960	1990	2013	Kubiszewski, Costanza, Franco, Lawn, Talberth, Jackson, Aylmer
GPI	Sweden	1950	1992	2013	Kubiszewski, Costanza, Franco, Lawn, Talberth, Jackson, Aylmer
GPI	United Kingdom	1950	2001	2013	Kubiszewski, Costanza, Franco, Lawn, Talberth, Jackson, Aylmer
GPI	United States	1950	2005	2013	Kubiszewski, Costanza, Franco, Lawn, Talberth, Jackson, Aylmer
GPI	Chile	1950	1992	2013	Kubiszewski, Costanza, Franco, Lawn, Talberth, Jackson, Aylmer
GPI	Australia	1965	2006	2013	Kubiszewski, Costanza, Franco, Lawn, Talberth, Jackson, Aylmer
GPI	New Zealand	1970	2005	2013	Kubiszewski, Costanza, Franco, Lawn, Talberth, Jackson, Aylmer
GPI	China	1970	2006	2013	Kubiszewski, Costanza, Franco, Lawn, Talberth, Jackson, Aylmer
GPI	India	1985	2003	2013	Kubiszewski, Costanza, Franco, Lawn, Talberth, Jackson, Aylmer
GPI	Japan	1970	2003	2013	Kubiszewski, Costanza, Franco, Lawn, Talberth, Jackson, Aylmer
GPI	Thailand	1975	2005	2013	Kubiszewski, Costanza, Franco, Lawn, Talberth, Jackson, Aylmer
GPI	Vietnam	1990	2005	2013	Kubiszewski, Costanza, Franco, Lawn, Talberth, Jackson, Aylmer
GPI	Global	1950	2005	2013	Kubiszewski, Costanza, Franco, Lawn, Talberth, Jackson, Aylmer
ISEW	Tuscany and Marche, Italy	1999	2009	2013	Chelli, Ciommi, Gigliarano
GPI	Maryland	1960	2013	2014	Hans Haake
GPI	Hawaii	2000	2020	2022	Regina Ostergaard-Klem, Kirsten Oleson
GPI	Colorado	1960	2011	2014	Chris Stiffler
ISEW	Flanders, Belgium	1990	2012	2014	Brent Bleys
GPI	Washington	1960	2015	2014	Siefer Amber & Rossman Jamie
IDI	Russia, Russian regions	1998	2016	2020	Barinova & Zemtsov
GPI	Krasnoyarsk Krai, Russia	2005	2011	2014	Pyzhev, Pyzheva & Zander
GPI	Brazil	1970	2010	2015	Daniel Caixeta Andrade, Junior Ruiz Garcia
GPI	Hong Kong	1968	2010	2015	Claudio O Delang (Book)
GPI	Singapore	1968	2010	2015	Claudio O Delang (Book)
GPI	Massachusetts	1960	2012	2015	Jon D. Erickson, Eric Zencey, and Zachary Zimmerman
GPI	Oregon	1960	2010	2015	Ida Kubiszewski, Robert Costanza, Nicole E. Gorko, Michael A. Weisdorf, Austin W. Carnes, Cathrine E. Collins, Carol Franco, Lillian R. Gehres, Jenna M. Knobloch, Gayle E. Matson, Joan D. Schoepfer
ISEW	Greece	2000	2012	2015	Angeliki Menegaki and Konstantinos Tsagarakis
ISEW	Flanders, Belgium	1990	2014	2016	Brent Bleys
GPI	Missouri	2000	2014	2016	Zencey, Eric
ISEW	Flanders, Belgium	1990	2015	2017	Brent Bleys
GPI	US, 50 States	2010	2011	2017	Mairi-Jane Fox
GPI	Liaoning, China	1978	2011	2017	Yu Hou
ISEW	Spain	1995	2014	2017	Ignacio Rodriguez Rodriguez
GPI	California	2010	2014	2018	Brown and Lazarus
ISEW	Turkey	2001	2012	2018	Angeliki Menegaki
N/RWI	Germany, Bavaria, Hamburg, North Rhine/Westphalia, Rhineland-Palantinate, Saxonia, Thuringia	1991	2014	2018	Held, Rodenhäuser, Diefenbacher, Zieschank
ISEW	Spain	1970	2012	2018	Tadhg O'Mahony, Paula Escardó-Serra, Javier Dufour
SWI	Italy	1960	2014	2018	Mirko Armiento
ISEW	Luxembourg	1960	2010	2018	Benedetto Rugani, Antonino Marvuglia, Federico Maria Pulselli
GPI	Vermont	2000	2015	2018	Eric Zencey
GPI	Ohio	2009	2016	2018	Rob Moore
GPI & ISEW	Finland	1945	2017	2018	Hoffren
GPI & ISEW	19 regions, Finland	1960	2017	2018	Hoffren
GPI	10 Chinese megacities (Beijing, Tianjin, Nanjing, Shanghai, Guangzhou, Chongqing, Chengdu, Xi'an, Wuhan, Shenyang), China	199x	201x	2018	Lu Huang
ISEW	Flanders, Belgium	1990	2016	2018	Brent Bleys, Jonas Van der Slycken
GPI	Iceland	2000	2016	2018	Anna Balafina
GPI	Australia	1962	2013	2019	Kenny et al.
GPI	31 provinces, China	1997	2016	2019	Xianling Long, Xi Ji
GPI	China	1997	2016	2019	Xianling Long, Xi Ji
GPI	28 OECD countries	1995(*)	2015(*)	2019	Pais, Alfonso, Marques, Fuinhas
GPI	South Korea and Malaysia	1980	2014	2019	Mastura Hashim, Azhar Mohamad, Imtiaz Mohammad Sifat
GPI	South Australia	1986	2016	2019	Philip Lawn
ISEW	Romania	1990	2017	2019	Butnariu & Luca
ISEW	Flanders	1990	2017	2019	Brent Bleys, Jonas Van der Slycken
GPI	New Zealand	1970	2016	2019	Patterson et al.
GPI	21 cities in the Rust Belt, United States	1990	2015	2019	LaToya S. Moten
ISEW	Ecuador	2001	2015	2020	Sanchez et al.
GPI	Ohio	2009	2018	2020	Rob Moore
GPI	North Carolina	2005	2018	2020	Juhi Modi
NWI	Germany	1991	2018	2020	Held, Rodenhäuser, Diefenbacher
ISEW	Flanders	1990	2018	2020	Brent Bleys, Jonas Van der Slycken
GPI	Rio de Janeiro state in Brazil	2002	2016	2021	Senna G.N. and Serra E.G.
GPI	Iceland	2000	2019	2021	David Cook and Brynhildur Davíðsdóttir
GPI	China and 29 provinces	2016	2016	2021	Guan, Weng, Zhao, Lin, Zhang and Tu
GPI	United States of America, and California	1995	2017	2022	Eli Lazarus and Clair Brown
ISEW/GPI	Belgium	1995	2018	2023	Jonas Van der Slycken, Brent Bleys
ISEW/GPI	EU-15 and its Member States	1995	2018	2024	Jonas Van der Slycken, Brent Bleys

== See also ==
- Broad measures of economic progress
- Disability-adjusted life year
- Economics
- Full cost accounting
- Green national product
- Green gross domestic product (Green GDP)
- Gender-related Development Index
- Global Peace Index
- Gross National Happiness
- Gross National Well-being (GNW)
- Happiness economics
- Happy Planet Index (HPI)
- Human Development Index (HDI)
- ISEW (Index of sustainable economic welfare)
- Progress (history)
- Progressive utilization theory
- Legatum Prosperity Index
- Leisure satisfaction
- Living planet index
- Millennium Development Goals (MDGs)
- Post-materialism
- Psychometrics
- Subjective life satisfaction
- Where-to-be-born Index
- Wikiprogress
- World Values Survey (WVS)
