= Roy Moxham =

British writer (1939–2026)

Moxham in 2014

Roy Moxham (13 September 1939 – 13 August 2026) was a British writer, who was the author of historical books highlighting little-known historical facts.

== Background ==
Moxham was born in Evesham, Worcestershire on 13 September 1939, and went to Prince Henry's Grammar School there. In 1961 he went to Nyasaland (now Malawi) to manage a tea plantation. In 1973 he returned to Britain and established a small gallery in Covent Garden to sell African art, travelling widely in Africa. In 1978 he went to Camberwell College of Art and Crafts, where he qualified as a book and archive conservator. Subsequently, he was a conservator at Canterbury Cathedral Archives and then became Senior Conservator at the Senate House Library of the University of London, from which he retired in 2005.

He spent much of his life living in London, and travelled widely in south and south-east Asia. Moxham was a Fellow of the Royal Geographical Society. He died on 13 August 2026, aged 86.

== Works ==
Moxham's first book was The Freelander, a novel based on the exploits of a group of idealists trying to establish a commune on Mount Kenya in the 1890s. His best-known book is The Great Hedge of India. This book is part-travelogue, part-historical treatise on the author's quest to find a 1500-mile long customs hedge built by the British in India to prevent smuggling of salt and sugar. His next book, Tea: Addiction, Exploitation and Empire focuses on the effect of British tea addiction on British policies in Asia and Africa, and includes the author's own experience as a tea plantation manager in Africa. After 13 years he returned to London and set up a gallery of African art. An updated edition " A Brief History of Tea" came out in 2009. In 2010 he published a memoir, "Outlaw: India's Bandit Queen and Me" about his friendship with Phoolan Devi, the Indian bandit turned politician. In 2014 he published as an e-book a novel, "The East India Company Wife", based on the real life of Catherine Cooke, a thirteen-year-old English girl who went to India with her parents in 1709. In November 2016 The Theft of India: The European Conquests of India 1498 – 1765 was published. He also taught and examined in the Institute of English Studies, University of London.

== Bibliography ==
- The Theft of India: The European conquests of India 1498 – 1765 (HarperCollins India, New Delhi: November 2016)
- The East India Company Wife (e-book: 2014)
- Outlaw: India's Bandit Queen and Me (Rider, London: 2010)
- A Brief History of Tea (Robinson: 2009)
- Tea: Addiction, Exploitation and Empire (Constable, London: 2003)
- The Great Hedge of India (Constable, London: 2001)
- The Freelander (Team, Nairobi: 1990)
