= Green gross domestic product =

Gross domestic product with environmental consequences factored in

The green gross domestic product (green GDP or GGDP) is an index of economic growth with the environmental consequences of that growth factored into a country's conventional GDP. Green GDP monetizes the loss of biodiversity, and accounts for costs caused by climate change. Some environmental experts prefer physical indicators (such as "waste per capita" or "carbon dioxide emissions per year"), which may be aggregated to indices such as the "Sustainable Development Index".

== Calculation ==
=== Formula ===
The environmental and related social costs to develop the economy are taken into consideration when calculating the green GDP, which can be expressed as:

Green GDP = GDP − Environmental Costs − Social Costs

where the environmental cost typically qualifies:

- Depletion value of natural resources, e.g. oil, coal, natural gas, wood, and metals;
- Degradation cost of ecological environment, e.g. underground water pollution, topsoil erosion, and extinction of wildlife;
- Restoration cost of natural resources, e.g. waste recycling, wetland restoration, and afforestation;

and the social costs typically include:

- Poverty caused by degradation of environment, e.g. shortage of natural resources after exploitation;
- Extra healthcare expenditure coming with the degradation of ecological environment;

Above calculations can also be applied to net domestic product (NDP), which deducts the depreciation of produced capital from GDP.

=== Valuation methodology ===
Since the indicators of environment are generally expressed in national accounts, the conversion of the resource activity into a monetary value is necessary. A common procedure to evaluate, proposed by United Nations in its System of Integrated Environmental and Economic Accounting handbook, applies following steps:

No.	SEEA Steps
1	Compilation of the supply and use accounts (GDP accounting)
2	Identification and compilation of environmental protection expenditures
3	Compilation of produced resource asset accounts
4	Compilation of physical resource accounts
5	Valuation of the resource: compiling the monetary accounts
6	Compilation of physical environmental accounts (non-economic assets)
7	Compilation of emissions by economic sector
8	Maintenance costing of environmental degradation

If current values of resources are non-existent or non-explicit, the next option is to value the resource based upon the present value of expected net returns from future commercial use. That is, the sum of present values for future expected income minus expected future expenditures (the cash flow CF), for each future time point (t), is termed the net present value (NPV).

== Rationale ==
The motivation for creating a green GDP originates from the inherent limitations of GDP as an indicator of economic performance and social progress. GDP assesses gross output alone, without identifying the wealth and assets that underlie output. GDP does not account for significant or permanent depletion, or replenishment, of these assets. Ultimately, GDP has no capacity to identify whether the level of income generated in a country is sustainable. Richard Stone, one of the creators of the original GDP index, suggested that, while "the three pillars on which an analysis of society ought to rest are studies of economic, socio-demographic, and environmental phenomenon", he had done little work in the area of environmental issues.

Natural capital is poorly represented in GDP. Resources are not adequately considered as economic assets. Relative to their costs, companies and policymakers also do not give sufficient weight to the future benefits generated by restorative or protective environmental projects. As well, the important positive externalities that arise from forests, wetlands, and agriculture are unaccounted for, or otherwise hidden, because of practical difficulties around measuring and pricing these assets. Similarly, the impact that the depletion of natural resources or increases in pollution can and do have on the future productive capacity of a nation are unaccounted for in traditional GDP estimates.

The need for a more comprehensive macroeconomic indicator is consistent with the conception of sustainable development as a desirable phenomenon. GDP is mistakenly appropriated as a primary indicator of well-being, and as a result, it is used heavily in the analysis of political and economic policy. Green GDP would arguably be a more accurate indicator or measure of societal well-being. Therefore, the integration of environmental statistics into national accounts, and by extension, the generation of a green GDP figure, would improve countries' abilities to manage their economies and resources.

== History ==
Many economists, scientists, and other scholars have theorized about adjusting macroeconomic indicators to account for environmental change. The idea was developed early on through the work of Nordhaus and Tobin (1972), Ahmad et al. (1989), Repetto et al. (1989), and Hartwick (1990).

In 1972, William Nordhaus and James Tobin introduced the first model to measure the annual real consumption of households, called the Measure of Economic Welfare (MEW). MEW adjusts GDP to include the value of leisure time, unpaid work, and environmental damages. They also defined a sustainable MEW (MEW-S) value, and their work was the precursor to more sophisticated measures of sustainable development.

Repetto further explored the impact that the failure of resource-based economies to account for the depreciation of their natural capital could have, especially by distorting evaluations of macroeconomic relationships and performance. He and his colleagues developed the concept of depreciation accounting, which factors environmental depreciation into "aggregate measures of economic performance".

In their seminal report, "Economic Accounting for Sustainable Development", Yusuf Ahmad, Salah El Serafy, and Ernst Lutz compiled papers from several UNEP-World Bank sponsored workshops, convened after 1983, on how to develop environmental accounting as a public policy tool. The central theme of all of the authors' arguments is that the system of national accounts (SNA), as it traditionally calculates income, omits important aspects of economic development that ought to be included. One important disagreement on environmentally adjusted indicators is presented by Anne Harrison and Salah El Serafy, in their respective chapters. Harrison argues that appropriate adjustments ought to be made within the existing SNA framework, while El Serafy suggests a redefinition of what constitutes intermediate and final demand. In his view, the SNA should not consider the sale of natural capital as generating value added, while at least part of the income generated from this sale should be excluded from GDP and net product. This would effectively allow GDP to continue to be used extensively.

In "Natural Resources, National Accounting and Economic Depreciation", John Hartwick presents an accounting methodology to find NNP, inclusive of the depletion of natural resource stock, by representing the use of natural resources as "economic depreciation magnitudes".

This method of accounting, which makes adjustments to the existing national account indicators, found traction in the System of Integrated Environmental and Economic Accounting (SEEA), published by the United Nations as an appendix to the 1993 SNA. The report offered five approaches, or versions, to developing environmental accounts. Over the years, the SEEA has been expanded and revised in view of the increased sophistication of accounting methodologies and technology. This revision will be explored in greater detail in the "Global Initiatives" section. Ultimately, the importance of the SEEA with respect to the green GDP is that it is possible to create full-sequence accounts from which aggregates, such as green GDP, can be derived and compared internationally, and many countries have begun this process.

Several reports and initiatives after the SEEA-1993 have explored the possibility of expanding or changing the scope of environmentally-adjusted macroeconomic indicators. As the popularity of green GDP and other environmentally adjusted macroeconomic indicators grows, their construction will increasingly draw on this continuously developing body of research, especially with respect to the methodology associated with valuing non-market capital (e.g., services from natural capital which exist outside of traditional market settings).

In 1993, the Bureau of Economic Analysis, the official bookkeeper of the U.S. economy, began responding to concerns that the GDP needed retooling. The agency began working on a green accounting system called Integrated Environmental and Economic Accounts. These initial results, released in 1994, showed that GDP numbers were overstating the impact of mining companies to the nation's economic wealth. Mining companies did not like those results, and in 1995, Alan B. Mollohan, a Democratic House Representative from West Virginia's coal country, sponsored an amendment to the 1995 Appropriations Bill that stopped the Bureau of Economic Analysis from working on revising the GDP.

Costanza et al. (1997) estimated the current economic value of 17 ecosystem services for 16 biomes. The value of the entire biosphere, most of which exists outside of the market, is estimated conservatively to be between $16–54 trillion per year. By comparison, global GNP is approximately $18 trillion per year. The size of this figure demonstrates the significance of ecosystem services on human welfare and income generation, and the importance of identifying and recognizing this value. The valuation techniques used by the authors were often based on estimations of individuals' "willingness-to-pay" for ecosystem services.

Kunte et al. (1998) use their paper "Estimating National Wealth: Methodology and Results" to demonstrate that expanding the national accounts to include natural capital is a "practical [and necessary] exercise". They estimate the total wealth of nations by including different components of wealth in their calculations, including natural capital. They place values on natural capital by using the concept of economic rent. "Economic rent is the return on a commodity in excess of the minimum required to bring forth its services. Rental value is therefore the difference between the market price and cost of production / extraction." Following this, and by adjusting calculations for (un)sustainable use patterns, they are able to determine the stock of natural capital in a country that more accurately reflects its wealth.

"Nature's Numbers: Expanding the National Economic Accounts to Include the Environment," written by William Nordhaus and Edward Kokkelenberg and published in 1999, examined whether or not to broaden the U.S. National Income and Product Accounts (NIPA) to include natural resources and the environment. The panel, which addressed this question, concluded that extending the NIPA and developing supplemental environmental accounts should be a high-priority goal for the U.S., because these would provide useful data on a variety of economic issues and government trends, which entailed both replenishing and extractive activities. One of the major findings of the report is that it is fundamentally necessary for green adjustments to account for instances when natural capital is discovered or replenished, along with general depletive activities.

=== Green GDP in China ===
As one of the fastest-growing countries in the world, China noticed the green GDP as early as 1997. City authorities had conducted a survey based on Beijing's GDP, and the result showed that around 75% of the total GDP was constituted by Green GDP, and the rest of the 25% flowed away as pollution. Other cities also started the same calculation. For example, green GDP in Yaan reported 80% of the total GDP, while Datong reported only 60%.

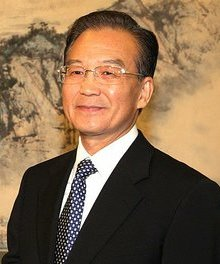
Chinese Premier Wen Jiabao

In 2004, Wen Jiabao, the Chinese premier, announced that the green GDP index would replace the Chinese GDP index itself as a performance measure for government and party officials at the highest levels. China’s State Environmental Protection Agency (SEPA), together with the National Bureau of Statistics(NBS), the Chinese Academy for Environmental Planning(CAEP), and units from Renmin University, investigated the nationwide Green GDP. The major environmental impacts in China were from air, water, and solid waste pollution. The first green GDP accounting report, for 2004, was published in September 2006. It showed that the financial loss caused by pollution was 511.8 billion yuan ($66.3 billion), or 3.05 percent of the nation's economy.

As an experiment in national accounting, the Green GDP effort collapsed in failure in 2007, when it became clear that the adjustment for environmental damage had reduced the growth rate to politically unacceptable levels, nearly zero in some provinces. In the face of mounting evidence that environmental damage and resource depletion was far more costly than anticipated, the government withdrew its support for the Green GDP methodology and suppressed the 2005 report, which had been due out in March, 2007. The failure of Green GDP in China is connected to the incongruity between central authorities and local government. Beijing was aware of the environmental costs of fast-growing GDP, and encouraged for cleaner or more efficient production. However, many local officials had direct connections with local businesses, and focused more on economic growth than damage by pollution. Another reason for the failure was due to the cost of data collection. It took both money and time to collect data and set them into databases. The Chinese government had a hard time collecting comprehensive environmental cost data. Only pollution and emission costs (air emissions, surface water pollution discards to land, and environmental accidents) were counted in, while social costs and natural resources depletion were missing.

Lang and Li (2009) use their paper "China's 'Green GDP' Experiment and the Struggle for Ecological Modernisation" to conclude that the attempt to implement green GDP was a signal that the Chinese government paid attention to environmental impacts. However, the fast-growing economy was more prioritized than environmental accounting, and the failure of the experiment was inevitable.

Independent estimates of the cost to China of environmental degradation and resource depletion have, for the last decade, ranged from 8 to 12 percentage points of GDP growth. These estimates support the idea that, by this measure at least, the growth of the Chinese economy is close to zero.

The most promising national activity on the green GDP has been from India. The country's environmental minister, Jairam Ramesh, stated in 2009 that "It is possible for scientists to estimate green GDP. An exercise has started under the country's chief statistician Pronab Sen and by 2015, India's GDP numbers will be adjusted with economic costs of environmental degradation."

== Organizations ==
The Global Reporting Initiative's (GRI) core goals include the mainstreaming of disclosure on environmental, social, and governance performance. Although the GRI is independent, it remains a collaborating centre of UNEP and works in cooperation with the United Nations Global Compact. It produces one of the world's most prevalent standards for sustainability reporting—also known as ecological footprint reporting, environmental social governance (ESG) reporting, triple bottom line (TBL) reporting, and corporate social responsibility (CSR) reporting. It is working on a green GDP to be implemented worldwide.

== Current debate ==
Some critics of environmentally adjusted aggregates, including GDP, point out that it may be difficult to assign values to some of the outputs that are quantified. This is a particular difficulty in cases where the environmental asset does not exist in a traditional market and is therefore non-tradable. Ecosystem services are one example of this type of resource. In the case that valuation is undertaken indirectly, there is a possibility that calculations may rely on speculation or hypothetical assumptions.

Supporters of adjusted aggregates may reply to this objection in one of two ways. First, that as our technological capabilities increase, more accurate methods of valuation have been and will continue to develop. Second, that while measurements may not be perfect in the cases of non-market natural assets, the adjustments they entail are still a preferable alternative to traditional GDP.

A second objection may be found in the Report by the Commission on the Measurement of Economic Performance and Social Progress, when Stiglitz, Sen, and Fitoussi remark that:

"there is a more fundamental problem with green GDP, which also applies to Nordhaus and Tobin's SMEW and to the ISEW/GNI indices. None of these measures characterize sustainability per se. Green GDP just charges GDP for the depletion of or damage to environmental resources. This is only one part of the answer to the question of sustainability."

== See also ==
- Environment of China
- Genuine progress indicator (GPI)
- Green national product
- Millennium Development Goals (MDGs)
