= Green national product =

Economic indicator

The green national product is an economic metric that seeks to include environmental features such as environmental degradation and resource depletion with a country's national product.

== Criticism of gross national product ==
The gross national product (GNP) measures the welfare of a nation's economy through the aggregate of products and services produced in that nation. Although GNP is a measurement of the magnitude of the economy, many economists, environmentalists and citizens have been arguing the validity of the GNP in respect to measuring welfare. Joseph Stiglitz, Nobel Prize–winning economist, states that this standard measurement for any national economy has become deficient as a measure of long-term economic health in the recently resource-driven and globalizing world. Critics suggest that GNP often includes the environment on the wrong side of the balance sheet because if someone first pollutes and then another person cleans the pollution, both activities add to GNP making environmental degradation frequently look good for the economy. Critics of mainstream economics complain that GNP compiles spending that makes us worse off, spending that allows us to stay in the same place, and spending that makes us better off all in a single measure, giving a nation no clue if they are making progress or not. Manfred Max-Neef, Chilean economist, explains that politicians feel that it is irrelevant whether the spending is productive, unproductive, or destructive. In this sense, it is common to see political policies that call to depredate a natural resource in order to increase the GNP. To take into account the environmental depredation and resource depletion, there is a call to shift away from the traditional GNP and construct an assessment of national product that takes into account environmental effects.

== History ==
=== Measure of economic welfare ===
Ever since the Industrial Revolution, scientists and economists have warned of an inflection point for the United States economy where expansion is inevitably limited by the steadily decreasing availability of natural resources. In 1973, Yale economists William D. Nordhaus and James Tobin were the first to question the GNP in "Is growth obsolete?". Nordhaus and Tobin developed a Measure of Economic Welfare (MEW) and stated that welfare must be sustainable, since nations that devour their stock of capital are not as "well" as the national income would suggest.

=== Index of sustainable economic welfare ===
In "The Green National Product", Clifford Cobb and John Cobb argue that the Measure of Economic Welfare failed to encompass the depletion of natural capital. In 1989, Herman Daly, John Cobb, and Clifford Cobb created what is known as the Index of Sustainable Economic Welfare (ISEW). This new measurement of welfare was created in the hopes that it would replace the flawed GNP. Herman Daly stated that the key flaw of the traditional GNP was that it ignored core accounting principles of business where all revenues and expenses are allocated to income. ISEW called for ecological and economic sustainability to coincide since the economy is ultimately dependent on the natural resources that the earth provides. In contrast to the original GNP, ISEW takes into account costs that are naturally unsustainable. By creating ISEW, they wanted to expand the current national product so that individuals, businesses, and governments could take actions that will generally enhance welfare, rather than merely enhancing the traditional GNP.

=== Genuine progress indicator ===
In 1995, Redefining Progress created the genuine progress indicator (GPI) as an alternative to the traditional GNP. This new measurement of national income would allow policymakers to gauge how well citizens are, economically and socially. Unlike welfare adjustments in the past like MEW and ISEW, GPI adjusts not only for environmental depredation, but also for income distribution, housework, volunteering, crime, changes in leisure time, and life-span of consumer durables and public infrastructure. This was one of the first alternatives to the traditional GNP to be used by the scientific community and governmental organizations globally.

=== In the United States ===
In 1992, the Bureau of Economic Analysis (BEA) of the U.S. Department of Commerce initiated intensive work to create an environmental accounting system. The BEA began by creating satellite accounts with easily measurable commodities such as petroleum and coal. The first BEA publication was the U.S. Integrated Environmental and Economic Satellite Accounts (IEESA) in 1994. The initial results were considered to be quite significant, and showed how GNP was overestimating the impact of mining industries in respect to the nation's economic wealth. Mining companies didn't care for the initial publications, and soon after Alan Mollohan, a Democratic House Representative from West Virginia's coal country, sponsored an amendment to the 1995 Appropriation Bill. In response, Congress directed the BEA to suspend further work in environmental accounting, and to obtain an external review on their findings.

== Need ==
Given criticisms of traditional economic metrics as being "poor" indicators of welfare, efforts have been made through green accounting to develop a green national product metric that additionally considers the environmental impacts of economic activities. Proposed metrics within green accounting have aimed to improve upon the traditional GNP and gross domestic product (GDP) by addressing the sustainability and well-being of the planet and its inhabitants.

== See also ==
- Green accounting
- Bhutan GNH Index
- Genuine progress indicator
- Green gross domestic product
- Gross National Happiness
- Happiness economics
- Index of Sustainable Economic Welfare
