= Philip Lawn =

Philip Lawn is a professor at Torrens University in South Australia, and a former associate professor at Flinders University. He is also a director of the charity Modern Money Lab.

The main topics of his work are sustainable development and Genuine Progress Indicator studies. His teaching at Torrens has a focus on ecological economics and sustainable development indicators.

== Publications ==
Lawn has written and edited books and articles on the notions, benchmarks, and policy aspects of sustainable development, including:

- The Ecological Economics of Climate Change (Springer, 2016)
- Sustainable Development Indicators in Ecological Economics (Edward Elgar Publishing, 2006)
- Frontier Issues in Ecological Economics (Edward Elgar, 2007)
- Sustainable Welfare in the Asia-Pacific (Edward Elgar, 2008, co-edited with Matthew Clarke)
- Environment and Employment: A Reconciliation.

== Career ==
Lawn began his teaching career as a lecturer in economics at Flinders University. He moved to The University of Adelaide in 2017/2018 to teach the courses 'East Asian Economies'. This course also includes some South-East-Asian countries, and focuses on genuine progress of these countries. In 2021, he moved to Torrens University and helped to establish Modern Money Lab.

Dr. Lawn founded The International Journal of Environment, Workplace, and Employment (Inderscience) in 2004 and served as the founding editor of the journal until 2009. He is also a guest editor of the International Journal of Environment and Sustainable Development.

Lawn developed and advances the use of the Genuine Progress Indicator (GPI) as a more indicative indicator of social well-being to Gross Domestic Product, and has developed a set of consistent indicators for most countries.

Lawn is also Research Scholar at the Global Institute for Sustainable Prosperity, and a member of the Wakefield Futures Group of Concerned Scientists.
