= Ecological indicator =

Attributes of ecosystems which signify their health

Ecological indicators are used to communicate information about ecosystems and the impact human activity has on ecosystems to groups such as the public or government policy makers. Ecosystems are complex and ecological indicators can help describe them in simpler terms that can be understood and used by non-scientists to make management decisions. For example, the number of different beetle taxa found in a field can be used as an indicator of biodiversity.

Many different types of indicators have been developed. They can be used to reflect a variety of aspects of ecosystems, including biological, chemical and physical. Due to this variety, the development and selection of ecological indicators is a complex process.

== Approach method ==
Using ecological indicators is a pragmatic approach since direct documentation of changes in ecosystems as related to management measures, is cost and time intensive. For example, it would be expensive and time-consuming to count every bird, plant and animal in a newly restored wetland to see if the restoration was a success. Instead, a few indicator species can be monitored to determine the success of the restoration.

The terms ecological indicator and environmental indicator are often used interchangeably. However, ecological indicators are actually a sub-set of environmental indicators. Generally, environmental indicators provide information on pressures on the environment, environmental conditions and societal responses. Ecological indicators refer only to ecological processes; however, sustainability indicators are seen as increasingly important for managing humanity's coupled human-environmental systems.

== Usages ==
Indicators contribute to evaluation of policy development by:

- Providing decision-makers and the general public with relevant information on the current state and trends in the environment.
- Helping decision-makers better understand cause and effect relationships between the choices and practices of businesses and policy-makers versus the environment.
- Assisting to monitor and assess the effectiveness of measures taken to increase and enhance ecological goods and services.

Based on the United Nations convention to combat desertification and convention for biodiversity, indicators are planned to be built in order to evaluate the evolution of the factors. For instance, for the CCD, the Unesco-funded Observatoire du Sahara et du Sahel (OSS) has created the Réseau d'Observatoires du Sahara et du Sahel (ROSELT) (website) as a network of cross-Saharan observatories to establish ecological indicators.

== Limitations ==
There are limitations and challenges to using indicators for evaluating policy programs.

For indicators to be useful for policy analysis, it is necessary to be able to use and compare indicator results on different scales (local, regional, national and international). Currently, indicators face the following spatial limitations and challenges:

1. Variable availability of data and information on local, regional and national scales.
2. Lack of methodological standards on an international scale.
3. Different ranking of indicators on an international scale which can result in different legal treatment.
4. Averaged values across a national level may hide regional and local trends.
5. When compiled, local indicators may be too diverse to provide a national result.

Indicators also face other limitations and challenges, such as:

1. Lack of reference levels, therefore it is unknown if trends in environmental change are strong or weak.
2. Indicator measures can overlap, causing over estimation of single parameters.
3. Long-term monitoring is necessary to identify long-term environmental changes.
4. Attention to more easily handled measurable indicators distracts from indicators less quantifiable such as aesthetics, ethics or cultural values.

== See also ==
- Ecological science
- Ecology movement
- Ecosystem valuation
- Ecological yield
- Deep ecology
- Human ecology
- Systems ecology
- Ecosystem ecology
- Ecoinformatics
- Ecosystem
- Environmental ethics
- Environmental economics
- Indicator plants
- Indicator species
- Measurement of biodiversity
