= State of the Environment =

The term State of the Environment normally relates to an analysis of trends in the environment of a particular place. This analysis can encompass aspects such as water quality, air quality, land use, ecosystem health and function, along with social and cultural matters.

== Pressure-State-Response Framework ==
Human activity places pressure on many aspects of the environment. For instance, deforestation results in the invasion of weed species, habitat displacement, and, when undertaken on a large scale, adversely affects air quality and carbon dioxide sequestration.

Examples of pressures under the Pressure-State-Response ("PSR") framework include: pollutants discharged from factories, or draining into a river from the land; it could be the removal of forest from the land or over-harvesting by fishermen or hunters.

In this framework, only pressures introduced by human interaction with the environment are considered. Natural pressures such as extreme weather are only considered in the context of human-induced climate change (i.e. global warming).

A "state" is the condition of the environment at a particular time. This is assessed by measuring various aspects of the atmosphere, air, water, land and organisms.

The European Environment Agency (EAA) has extended the pressure-state-response framework to include driving forces and impacts (see DPSIR). The EAA publishes its most comprehensive ‘state of environment’ report every five years.

== State of the Environment reporting ==
State of Environment reports have been prepared by countries such as New Zealand and Australia. State of the Environment reporting is also undertaken fairly extensively throughout New Zealand by territorial and regional authorities.

== See also ==
- State of the World , a series of books published by the World Watch Institute
- Environmental issue
