= DPSIR =

Framework between society and the environment

DPSIR (drivers, pressures, state, impact, and response model of intervention) is a causal framework used to describe the interactions between society and the environment. It seeks to analyze and assess environmental problems by bringing together various scientific disciplines, environmental managers, and stakeholders, and solve them by incorporating sustainable development. First, the indicators are categorized into "drivers" which put "pressures" in the "state" of the system, which in turn results in certain "impacts" that will lead to various "responses" to maintain or recover the system under consideration. It is followed by the organization of available data, and suggestion of procedures to collect missing data for future analysis. Since its formulation in the late 1990s, it has been widely adopted by international organizations for ecosystem-based study in various fields like biodiversity, soil erosion, and groundwater depletion and contamination. In recent times, the framework has been used in combination with other analytical methods and models, to compensate for its shortcomings. It is employed to evaluate environmental changes in ecosystems, identify the social and economic pressures on a system, predict potential challenges and improve management practices. The flexibility and general applicability of the framework make it a resilient tool that can be applied in social, economic, and institutional domains as well.

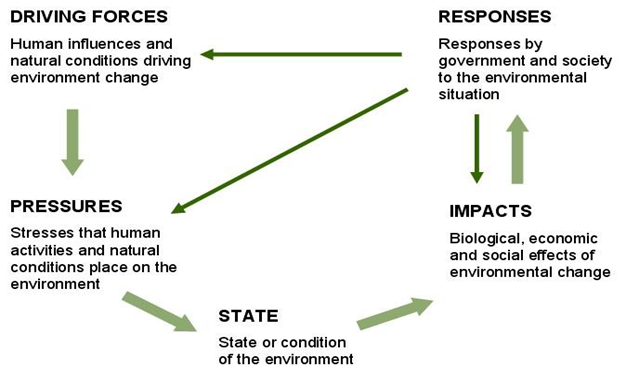
The Driver-Pressure-State-Impact-Response Framework

== History ==
The Driver-Pressure-State-Impact-Response framework was developed by the European Environment Agency (EEA) in 1999. It was built upon several existing environmental reporting frameworks, like the Pressure-State-Response (PSR) framework developed by the Organization for Economic Co-operation and Development (OECD) in 1993, which itself was an extension of Rapport and Friend's Stress-Response (SR) framework (1979). The PSR framework simplified environmental problems and solutions into variables that stress the cause-effect relationship between human activities that exert pressure on the environment, the state of the environment, and society's response to the condition. Since it focused on anthropocentric pressures and responses, it did not effectively factor natural variability into the pressure category. This led to the development of the expanded Driving Force-State-Response (DSR) framework, by the United Nations Commission on Sustainable Development (CSD) in 1997. A primary modification was the expansion of the concept of "pressure" to include social, political, economic, demographic, and natural system pressures. However, by replacing "pressure" with "driving force", the model failed to account for the underlying reasons for the pressure, much like its antecedent. It also did not address the motivations behind responses to changes in the state of the environment. The refined DPSIR model sought to address these shortcomings of its predecessors by addressing root causes of the human activities that impact the environment, by incorporating natural variability as a pressure on the current state and addressing responses to the impact of changes in state on human well-being. Unlike PSR and DSR, DPSIR is not a model, but a means of classifying and disseminating information related to environmental challenges. Since its conception, it has evolved into modified frameworks like Driver-Pressure-Chemical State-Ecological State-Response (DPCER), Driver-Pressure-State-Welfare-Response (DPSWR), and Driver-Pressure-State-Ecosystem-Response (DPSER).

== The DPSIR Framework ==
=== Driver (Driving Force) ===
Driver refers to the social, demographic, and economic developments which influence the human activities that have a direct impact on the environment. They can further be subdivided into primary and secondary driving forces. Primary driving forces refer to technological and societal actors that motivate human activities like population growth and distribution of wealth. The developments induced by these drivers give rise to secondary driving forces, which are human activities triggering "pressures" and "impacts", like land-use changes, urban expansion and industrial developments. Drivers can also be identified as underlying or immediate, physical or socio-economic, and natural or anthropogenic, based on the scope and sector in which they are being used.

=== Pressure ===
Pressure represents the consequence of the driving force, which in turn affects the state of the environment. They are usually depicted as unwanted and negative, based on the concept that any change in the environment caused by human activities is damaging and degrading. Pressures can have effects on the short run (e.g.: deforestation), or the long run (e.g.: climate change), which if known with sufficient certainty, can be expressed as a probability. They can be both human-induced, like emissions, fuel extraction, and solid waste generation, and natural processes, like solar radiation and volcanic eruptions. Pressures can also be sub-categorized as endogenic managed pressures, when they stem from within the system and can be controlled (e.g.: land claim, power generation), and as exogenic unmanaged pressures, when they stem from outside the system and cannot be controlled (e.g.: climate change, geomorphic activities).

=== State ===
State describes the physical, chemical and biological condition of the environment or observable temporal changes in the system. It may refer to natural systems (e.g.: atmospheric CO_{2} concentrations, temperature), socio-economic systems (e.g.: living conditions of humans, economic situations of an industry), or a combination of both (e.g.: number of tourists, size of current population). It includes a wide range of features, like physico-chemical characteristics of ecosystems, quantity and quality of resources or "carrying capacity", management of fragile species and ecosystems, living conditions for humans, and exposure or the effects of pressures on humans. It is not intended to just be static, but to reflect current trends as well, like increasing eutrophication and change in biodiversity.

=== Impact ===
Impact refers to how changes in the state of the system affect human well-being. It is often measured in terms of damages to the environment or human health, like migration, poverty, and increased vulnerability to diseases, but can also be identified and quantified without any positive or negative connotation, by simply indicating a change in the environmental parameters. Impact can be ecologic (e.g.: reduction of wetlands, biodiversity loss), socio-economic (e.g.: reduced tourism), or a combination of both. Its definition may vary depending on the discipline and methodology applied. For instance, it refers to the effect on living beings and non-living domains of ecosystems in biosciences (e.g.: modifications in the chemical composition of air or water), whereas it is associated with the effects on human systems related to changes in the environmental functions in socio-economic sciences (e.g.: physical and mental health).

=== Response ===
Response refers to actions taken to correct the problems of the previous stages, by adjusting the drivers, reducing the pressure on the system, bringing the system back to its initial state, and mitigating the impacts. It can be associated uniquely with policy action, or to different levels of the society, including groups and/or individuals from the private, government or non-governmental sectors. Responses are mostly designed and/or implemented as political actions of protection, mitigation, conservation, or promotion. A mix of effective top-down political action and bottom-up social awareness can also be developed as responses, such as eco-communities or improved waste recycling rates.

== Criticisms and Limitations ==
Despite the adaptability of the framework, it has faced several criticisms. One of the main goals of the framework is to provide environmental managers, scientists of various disciplines, and stakeholders with a common forum and language to identify, analyze and assess environmental problems and consequences. However, several notable authors have mentioned that it lacks a well-defined set of categories, which undermines the comparability between studies, even if they are similar. For instance, climate change can be considered as a natural driver, but is primarily caused by greenhouse gases (GHGs) produced by human activities, which may be categorized under "pressure". A wastewater treatment plant is considered a response while dealing with water pollution, but a pressure when effluent runoff leading to eutrophication is taken into account. This ambivalence of variables associated with the framework has been criticized as a lack of good communication between researchers and between stakeholders and policymakers. Another criticism is the misguiding simplicity of the framework, which ignores the complex synergy between the categories. For instance, an impact can be caused by various different state conditions and responses to other impacts, which is not addressed by DPSIR. Some authors also argue that the framework is flawed as it does not clearly illustrate the cause-effect linkage for environmental problems. The reasons behind these contextual differences seem to be differences in opinions, characteristics of specific case studies, misunderstanding of the concepts and inadequate knowledge of the system under consideration.

DPSIR was initially proposed as a conceptual framework rather than a practical guidance, by global organizations. This means that at a local level, analyses using the framework can cause some significant problems. DPSIR does not encourage the examination of locally specific attributes for individual decisions, which when aggregated, could have potentially large impacts on sustainability. For instance, a farmer who chooses a particular way of livelihood may not create any consequential alterations on the system, but the aggregation of farmers making similar choices will have a measurable and tangible effect. Any efforts to evaluate sustainability without considering local knowledge could lead to misrepresentations of local situations, misunderstandings of what works in particular areas and even project failure.

While there is no explicit hierarchy of authority in the DPSIR framework, the power difference between "developers" and the "developing" could be perceived as the contributor to the lack of focus on local, informal responses at the scale of drivers and pressures, thus compromising the validity of any analysis conducted using it. The "developers" refer to the Non-Governmental Organizations (NGOs), State mechanisms and other international organizations with the privilege to access various resources and power to use knowledge to change the world, and the "developing" refers to local communities. According to this criticism, the latter is less capable of responding to environmental problems than the former. This undermines valuable indigenous knowledge about various components of the framework in a particular region, since the inclusion of the knowledge is almost exclusively left at the discretion of the "developers".

Another limitation of the framework is the exclusion of social and economic developments on the environment, particularly for future scenarios. Furthermore, DPSIR does not explicitly prioritize responses and fails to determine the effectiveness of each response individually, when working with complex systems. This has been one of the most criticized drawbacks of the framework, since it fails to capture the dynamic nature of real-world problems, which cannot be expressed by simple causal relations.

== Applications ==
Despite its criticisms, DPSIR continues to be widely used to frame and assess environmental problems to identify appropriate responses. Its main objective is to support sustainable management of natural resources. DPSIR structures indicators related to the environmental problem addressed with reference to the political objectives and focuses on supposed causal relationships effectively, such that it appeals to policy actors. Some examples include the assessment of the pressure of alien species, evaluation of impacts of developmental activities on the coastal environment and society, identification of economic elements affecting global wildfire activities, and cost-benefit analysis (CBA) and gross domestic product (GDP) correction.

To compensate for its shortcomings, DPSIR is also used in conjunction with several analytical methods and models. It has been used in conjunction with Multiple-Criteria Decision Making (MCDM) for desertification risk management, with Analytic Hierarchy Process (AHP) to study urban green electricity power, and with Tobit model to assess freshwater ecosystems. The framework itself has also been modified to assess specific systems, like DPSWR, which focuses on the impacts on human welfare alone, by shifting ecological impact to the state category. Another approach is a differential DPSIR (ΔDPSIR), which evaluates the changes in drivers, pressures and state after implementing a management response, making it valuable both as a scientific output and a system management tool. The flexibility offered by the framework makes it an effective tool with numerous applications, provided the system is properly studied and understood by the stakeholders.
