= Sahara and Sahel Observatory =

The Sahara and Sahel Observatory (French: Observatoire du Sahara et du Sahel, OSS) is an African intergovernmental organisation established in 1992 and based in Tunis, Tunisia. Its aim is to protect the environment in Sahara and Sahel, supervise the usage of natural resources in the region, and lobby for environmental accords, especially those pertaining desertification and climate change. The membership of the organisation comprises 22 African countries, five countries outside Africa (Canada, France, Germany, Italy, Switzerland), ten international organisations (including five sub-regional representatives from West, East and North Africa) and one non-governmental organisation. The organisation raised €17 million between 2006 and 2011. In April 2016, the Kingdom of Morocco was elected to a four-year term presiding the organisation.

Some of OSS projects include the Long Term Ecological Observatory Network (French: Réseau d'Observatoires de Surveillance Ecologique à long Terme, ROSELT), which consists of 25 observatories in 12 countries; a drought early warning system in Maghreb; and cross-border groundwater management in Algeria, Libya and Tunisia.
