= Didi Ananda Devapriya =

American-born humanitarian

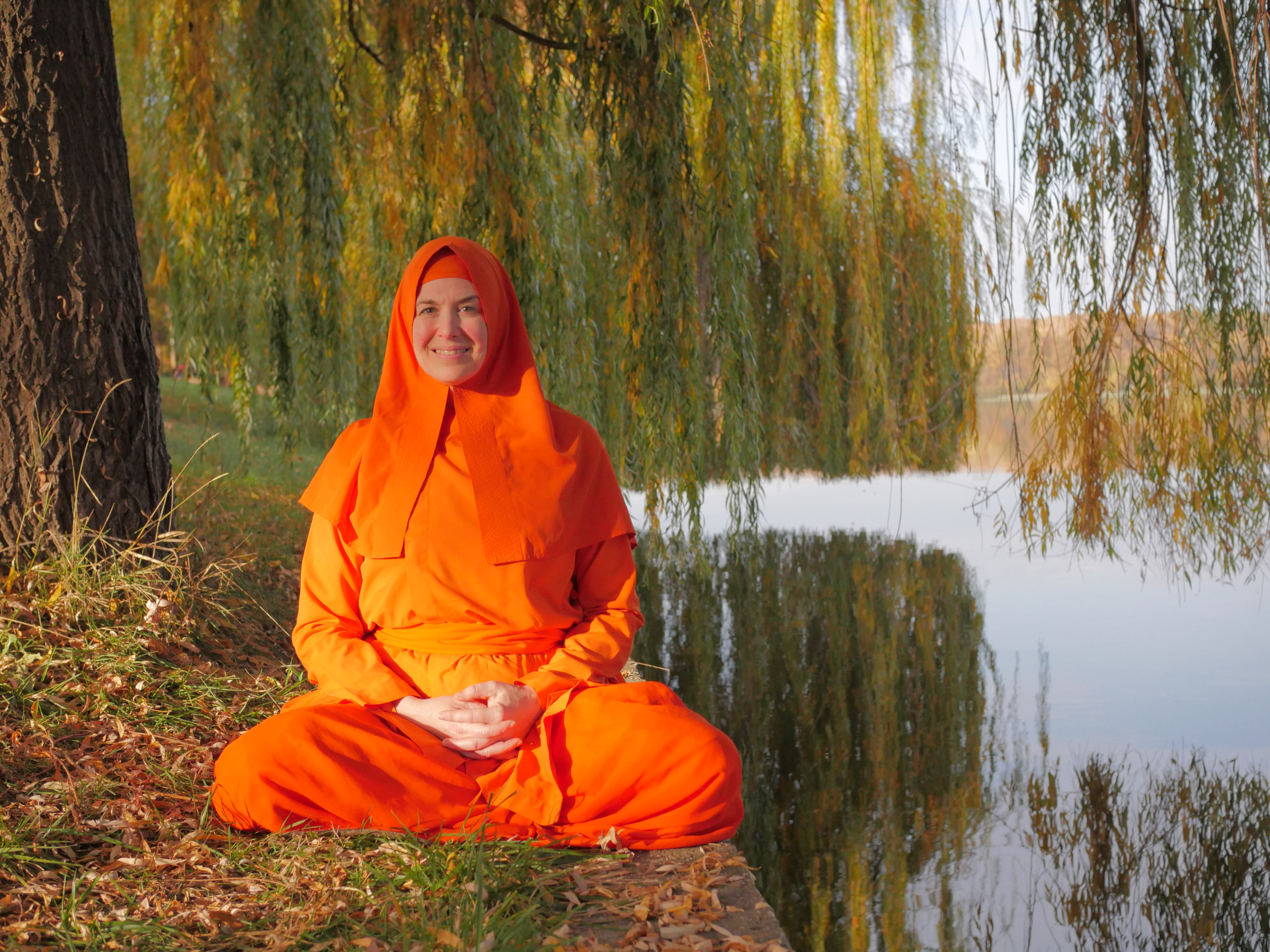
- Born: July 20, 1972 (age 53); Chicago, U.S.

Philosophical work
- School: Neohumanism
- Main interests: PROUT, economic democracy, meditation, yoga

Didi Ananda Devapriya is a spiritual teacher (acarya) of the organisation Ananda Marga and the national coordinator of AMURTEL Romania. She is Ananda Marga’s most active media and online representative.

== Early life and spiritual path ==
Originally from the United States, Ananda Devapriya discovered her spiritual path in Chicago in 1995 while working at the School of the Art Institute of Chicago. After exploring different traditions, she joined the Ananda Marga movement, which combines meditation and social service. In 2001, she was ordained as an acarya in Kolkata, India, and began serving as a spiritual teacher in Europe, first in Verona, Italy. In 2005 she relocated to Romania to develop social and educational projects inspired by Neohumanist philosophy.

== Work in Romania ==
Since moving to Romania, Ananda Devapriya has coordinated a range of educational and humanitarian initiatives under AMURTEL. These include the AMURTEL Family Residential Centre for children, the Grădinița Răsărit holistic kindergarten in Bucharest, and the Fountain of Hope after-school centre in Pănătău.

She has coordinated AMURTEL’s assistance for Ukrainian refugees, leading several large-scale projects supported by CARE, NRC and SERA that reached over 7,000 beneficiaries.

In 2012 she established the AMURTEL Bio Garden, later developed into the Zoriza Regenerative Garden.

== International work ==
Ananda Devapriya has been involved in various international activities related to education, social service, and humanitarian work through AMURT and AMURTEL. Her efforts have focused on supporting community development and promoting Neohumanist education principles in different regions.

She has coordinated several education and refugee support projects recognized by ISSA. In early 2022, following the full-scale Russian invasion of Ukraine, Didi Ananda Devapriya, as the President of the Neohumanist Education Association, led AMURTEL Romania’s efforts to provide psychological first aid to refugee children and parents on the Romanian border.
