= Dada Maheshvarananda =

American yoga monk (born 1953)

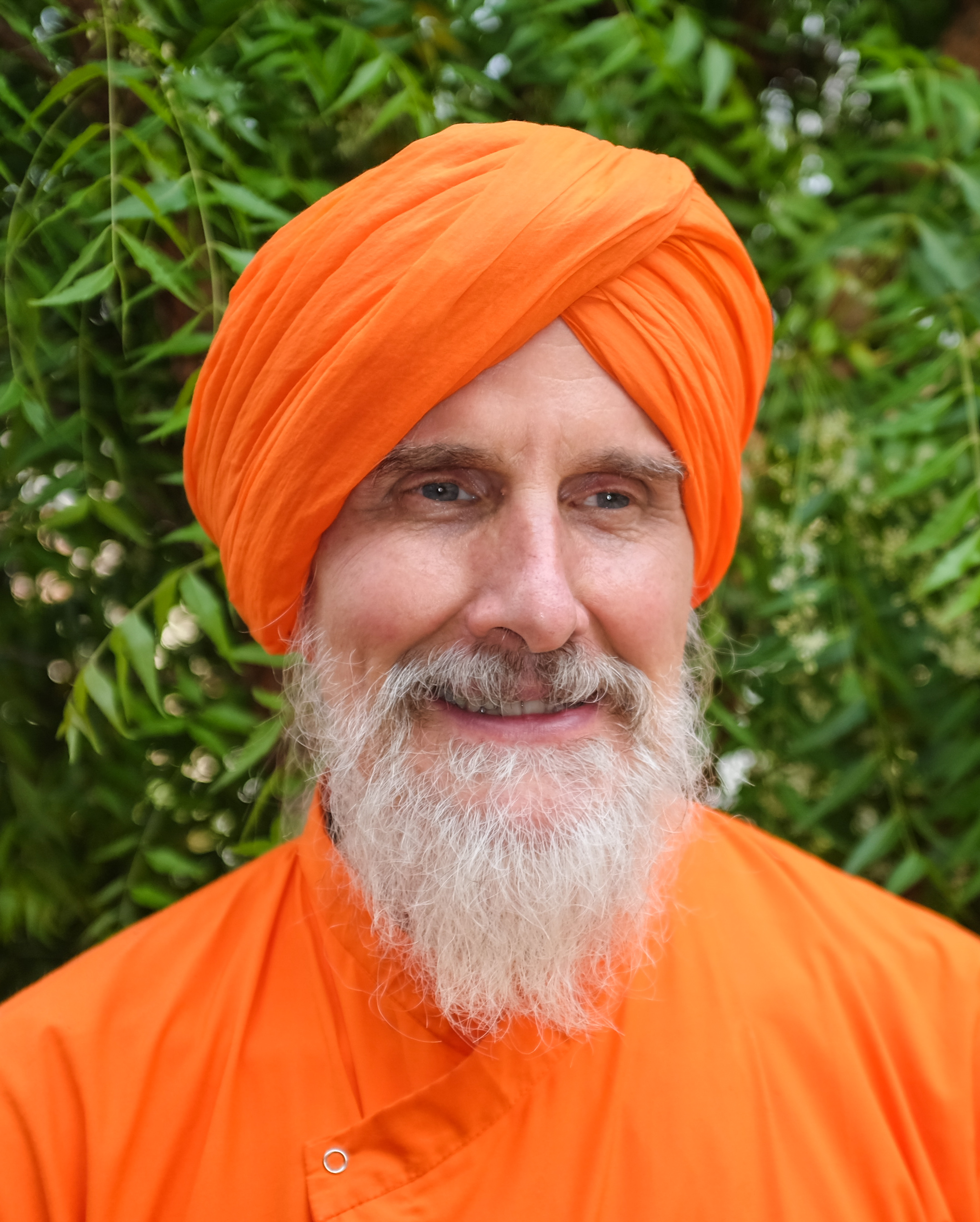
- Maheshvarananda in 2011
- Born: May 11, 1953 (age 73); Philadelphia, Pennsylvania, U.S.

Philosophical work
- School: Neohumanism
- Main interests: PROUT, economic democracy, meditation, yoga

Dada Maheshvarananda (born May 11, 1953) is a yogic monk, activist, writer and the founder of the Prout Research Institute of Venezuela.

Since becoming a monk in Ananda Marga, Maheshvarananda has taught meditation, yoga and the Progressive Utilization Theory (PROUT) globally.

== Early life ==
=== Southeast Asia ===
From 1979 to 1991 Maheshvarananda taught meditation and yoga in Indonesia and the Philippines (also known as "Maharlika").

=== Brazil ===
From 1992 to 2003 Maheshvarananda worked in Brazil, where he participated in Eco-92 and the World Social Forum.

=== Venezuela ===
Maheshvarananda and José Albarrán founded the Prout Research Institute of Venezuela in Caracas, an independent, not-for-profit foundation.

== Publications ==
- “Go with the Flow” (1985)
- "A Personal Remembrance and Conversation with Paulo Freire, Educator of the Oppressed" in Neohumanist Educational Futures: Liberating the Pedagogical Intellect, edited by Sohail Inayatullah, Marcus Bussey and Ivana Milojević, Tapei, Tamkang University Press, 2006.
- “Revolutionary Consciousness: Development as transformation”(subscription required) in Development 46, (1 December 2003).
- “Will Organized Religions Survive in the New Millennium?” in New Renaissance, Vol. 9, Number 3.
- “Ideal Leadership”
- "Spirituality and Social Change"
- "The Human Costs of Economic Meltdown and its Alternative"
- "A New Social Paradigm Based On Spiritual Values" on Znet.
- Published with Mariah Branch, The Progressive Utilization Theory (Prout): Alternative Economic and Social Model for the Welfare of All (2010) in WorkingUSA: The Journal of Labor and Society.
- After Capitalism: Prout's Vision for a New World (2003, Proutist Universal Publications) ISBN 1-877762-06-7 (paperback), published in 10 languages.
- After Capitalism: Economic Democracy in Action (2012, Innerworld Publications) ISBN 978-1-881717-14-0 (paperback)
- Cooperative Games for a Cooperative World: Facilitating Trust, Communication and Spiritual Connection (2017, InnerWorld Publications) ISBN 978-1-881717-59-1 (paperback), published in three languages.

== See also ==
- Prabhat Ranjan Sarkar
- Ananda Sutram
