= Notun Prithivi =

Indian Bengali language weekly newspaper

- Type: Weekly newspaper
- Format: Broadsheet
- Headquarters: Kolkata, West Bengal, India

Notun Prithivi (Bengali: নোতুন পৃথিবী) is an Indian Bengali language weekly newspaper published from Kolkata, West Bengal. It was founded by Prabhat Ranjan Sarkar. The current editor and publisher is Acarya Mantrasiddhananda Avadhuta. It is circulated on behalf of the Proutist Universal, India.

It has different sections: Adhyatmik Prasanga, PROUT Prabaktar Bhasay, Sambad Darpan, Deshe Deshe Ananda Marga, prabandha, khela, Narir Maryada, Swasthya, Prabhati and Itikatha.

== List of editor-publishers (incomplete) ==
- Acarya Piyushananda Avadhuta
- Acarya Abhibratananda Avadhuta
- Acarya Satyashivananda Avadhuta
- Acarya Mantrasiddhananda Avadhuta
