= Progressive Party of Aotearoa New Zealand =

Progressive Party Of Aotearoa New Zealand
- Leader: Bruce Dyer
- Founded: 2020
- Ideology: Progressive Utilization Theory; Distributism; Economic democracy
- Political position: Syncretic
- International affiliation: Proutist Universal
- Colours: Purple and Orange
- MPs in the House of Representatives: 0 / 120

Website
- https://www.progressiveparty.co.nz/

The Progressive Party of Aotearoa New Zealand (PPANZ) is an unregistered political party in New Zealand. The party supports the Progressive Utilization Theory of Prabhat Ranjan Sarkar, including economic democracy and the transformation of large businesses into cooperatives. It is led by Bruce Dyer.

== 2020 election ==
As an unregistered party, PPANZ was unable to contest the party vote. It stood two candidates in the Nelson and Mana electorates in the 2020 New Zealand general election. Neither candidate was successful; leader Bruce Dyer received 50 electorate votes, or 0.1% of the vote.

== 2023 election ==
Bruce Dyer was again a candidate for the Nelson electorate in 2023. He was the party's only candidate.

== 2026 election ==
In August 2026, PPANZ announced they would be standing candidates in the 2026 New Zealand general election, with Dyer standing in Nelson, Michael Walker, who stood for the party in 2020, standing in Kapiti, and Kevin Rooke standing in West Coast-Tasman. None of the candidates were successful, with Dyer receiving 60 votes and coming last out of seven candidates in Nelson based on preliminary results.
