= Tempelhof-Schöneberg 2 =

State electoral district of Germany

- Electoral district for the Berlin House of Representatives
- Tempelhof-Schöneberg 2 in 2026
- District: Tempelhof-Schöneberg
- Electorate: 33,576 (2026)

Current electoral district
- Party: Green
- Member: Martina Zander-Rade

Tempelhof-Schöneberg 2 is an electoral constituency (German: Wahlkreis) represented in the House of Representatives of Berlin. It elects one member via first-past-the-post voting.

== Geography ==
The constituency comprises the areas of Bayerischer Platz, Schöneberg Town Hall, Richard-von-Weizsäcker-Platz, Hauptstraße, and parts of Schöneberg Island, and is entirely within the borough of Tempelhof-Schöneberg.

There were 33,576 eligible voters in 2026.

== Members ==
Election	Member	Party	%
1990	Ingrid Buchholz	CDU	36.0
1995	Ingrid Buchholz	CDU	38.2
1999	Ingrid Buchholz	CDU	31.6
2001	Frank Zimmermann	SPD	38.7
2006	Lars Oberg	SPD	39.0
2011	Lars Oberg	SPD	36.3
2016	Catherina Pieroth-Manelli	Greens	36.3
2021	Catherina Pieroth-Manelli	Greens	35.9
2023	Catherina Pieroth-Manelli	Greens	36.9
2026	Martina Zander-Rade	Greens	29.4

== Election results ==
=== 2026 election ===
State election (2026): Tempelhof-Schöneberg 2
Notes:	Blue background denotes the winner of the electorate vote. Pink background denotes a candidate elected from their party list. Yellow background denotes an electorate win by a list member, or other incumbent. A ✓ or ✗ denotes status of any incumbent, win or lose respectively.						
Party	Candidate	Votes	%	±%	Party votes	%	±%
Greens	Martina Zander-Rade	7,602	29.4	▼7.5	6,352	24.4	▼9.8
Left	Asya Șenyüz	7,045	27.2	▲15.8	8,462	32.5	▲19.1
SPD	Michael Biel	4,389	16.9	▼5.1	3,602	13.8	▼5.4
CDU	Katharina Kulina	3,109	12.0	▼5.7	3,401	13.1	▼4.1
AfD	Diana Alekseevna Kraft	1,629	6.3	▲2.6	1,672	6.4	▲2.8
BSW	Çiǧdem Görülü	744	2.9		857	3.3	
Volt	Alain Cerny	451	1.7		523	2.0	▲0.5
Tierschutzpartei	Viola Carroll	447	1.7	▼0.5	383	1.5	▼0.3
FDP	Ruben Padberg	395	1.5	▼1.5	467	1.8	▼1.9
PARTEI					159	0.6	▼0.6
Independent	Nuri Trockle	83	0.3				
PdF					54	0.2	
ÖDP					31	0.1	Steady
du.					21	0.1	▼0.2
DKP					18	0.1	▼0.1
SGP					12	0.0	Steady
Informal votes		327			207		
Total valid votes		25,894			26,014		
Turnout		26,221	78.1	▲12.0			
Greens hold	Majority	557	2.2	▼12.7			

=== 2023 repeat election ===
Changes denoted below for the 2023 election are compared to the 2016 election, as the 2021 election was declared invalid.

State election (2023): Tempelhof-Schöneberg 2
Notes:	Blue background denotes the winner of the electorate vote. Pink background denotes a candidate elected from their party list. Yellow background denotes an electorate win by a list member, or other incumbent. A ✓ or ✗ denotes status of any incumbent, win or lose respectively.						
Party	Candidate	Votes	%	±%	Party votes	%	±%
Greens	✓ Catherina Pieroth-Manelli	7,830	36.9	▲6.1	7,311	34.2	▲5.6
SPD	Michael Biel	4,677	22.0	▼6.4	4,120	19.3	▼5.4
CDU	Peter Mair	3,759	17.7	▲5.7	3,672	17.2	▲5.8
Left	Elisabeth Wissel	2,426	11.4	▼0.9	2,878	13.5	▼1.0
AfD	Frank-Christian Hansel	774	3.6	▼3.3	785	3.7	▼3.3
FDP	Reinhard Frede	633	3.0	▼1.6	788	3.7	▼2.0
Tierschutzpartei	Sandrina König	473	2.2		385	1.8	▲0.5
Volt					323	1.5	
PARTEI	Otto Hempel	399	1.9	▼0.2	269	1.3	▼0.9
dieBasis	Frank Denecke	157	0.7		130	0.6	
Team Todenhöfer					112	0.5	
Klimaliste					96	0.4	
Gray Panthers					67	0.3	▼0.3
Pirates					60	0.3	▼2.0
du.					52	0.2	
FW	Brian Schmidt	101	0.5		47	0.2	
Humanists					38	0.2	
The Grays					38	0.2	
Mieterpartei					35	0.2	
DKP					30	0.1	▼0.1
MW					24	0.1	▼0.3
Bergpartei, die ÜberPartei					22	0.1	
Bildet Berlin!					22	0.1	
Verjüngungsforschung					18	0.1	▼0.2
SGP					16	0.1	▼0.2
ÖDP					15	0.1	
NPD					10	0.0	▼0.1
The Pinks/Alliance 21					6	0.0	
LKR					3	0.0	▼0.3
BüSo					2	0.0	▼0.1
Informal votes		21,229			21,374		
Total valid votes		254			115		
Turnout		21,499	66.1	▼4.3			
Greens hold	Majority	3,153	14.9				

=== 2021 election (annulled) ===
The election in 2021 was annulled and rerun in 2023.

State election (2021): Tempelhof-Schöneberg 2
Notes:	Blue background denotes the winner of the electorate vote. Pink background denotes a candidate elected from their party list. Yellow background denotes an electorate win by a list member, or other incumbent. A ✓ or ✗ denotes status of any incumbent, win or lose respectively.						
Party	Candidate	Votes	%	±%	Party votes	%	±%
Greens	✓ Catherina Pieroth-Manelli	9,121	35.9	▲5.2	8,416	33.0	▲4.4
SPD	Michael Biel	6,124	24.1	▼4.3	5,040	19.8	▼4.9
Left	Elisabeth Wissel	3,344	13.2	▲0.9	3,903	15.3	▲0.9
CDU	Peter Mair	2,958	11.7	▼0.4	2,710	10.6	▼0.7
FDP	Reinhard Frede	1,205	5.7	▲0.2	1,372	5.4	▼0.3
AfD	Frank-Christian Hansel	833	3.3	▼3.6	845	3.3	▼3.7
Volt					500	2.0	
Tierschutzpartei	Sandrina König	565	2.2		366	1.4	▲0.1
PARTEI	Otto Hempel	564	2.2	▲0.1	438	1.7	▼0.4
Team Todenhöfer					382	1.5	
dieBasis	Frank Denecke	433	1.7		347	1.4	
Klimaliste					295	1.2	
FW	Brian Schmidt	238	0.9		139	0.5	
Pirates					108	0.4	▼1.9
Gray Panthers					85	0.3	▼0.3
du.					77	0.3	
The Grays					76	0.3	
APT					71	0.3	
Mieterpartei					44	0.2	
Bildet Berlin!					42	0.2	
Humanists					40	0.2	
DKP					36	0.1	▼0.1
ÖDP					31	0.1	
Verjüngungsforschung					31	0.1	▼0.1
MW					21	0.1	▼0.3
The Pinks/Alliance 21					14	0.1	
Bergpartei, die ÜberPartei					12	0.0	
LKR					11	0.0	▼0.2
NPD					11	0.0	▼0.1
SGP					8	0.0	▼0.3
BüSo					5	0.0	▼0.1
Informal votes		273			187		
Total valid votes		25,385			25,476		
Turnout		25,701	79.0	▲8.7			
Greens hold	Majority	2,997	11.8				

== See also ==
- Politics of Berlin
- House of Representatives of Berlin
