= Katharina Senge =

German politician (born 1982)

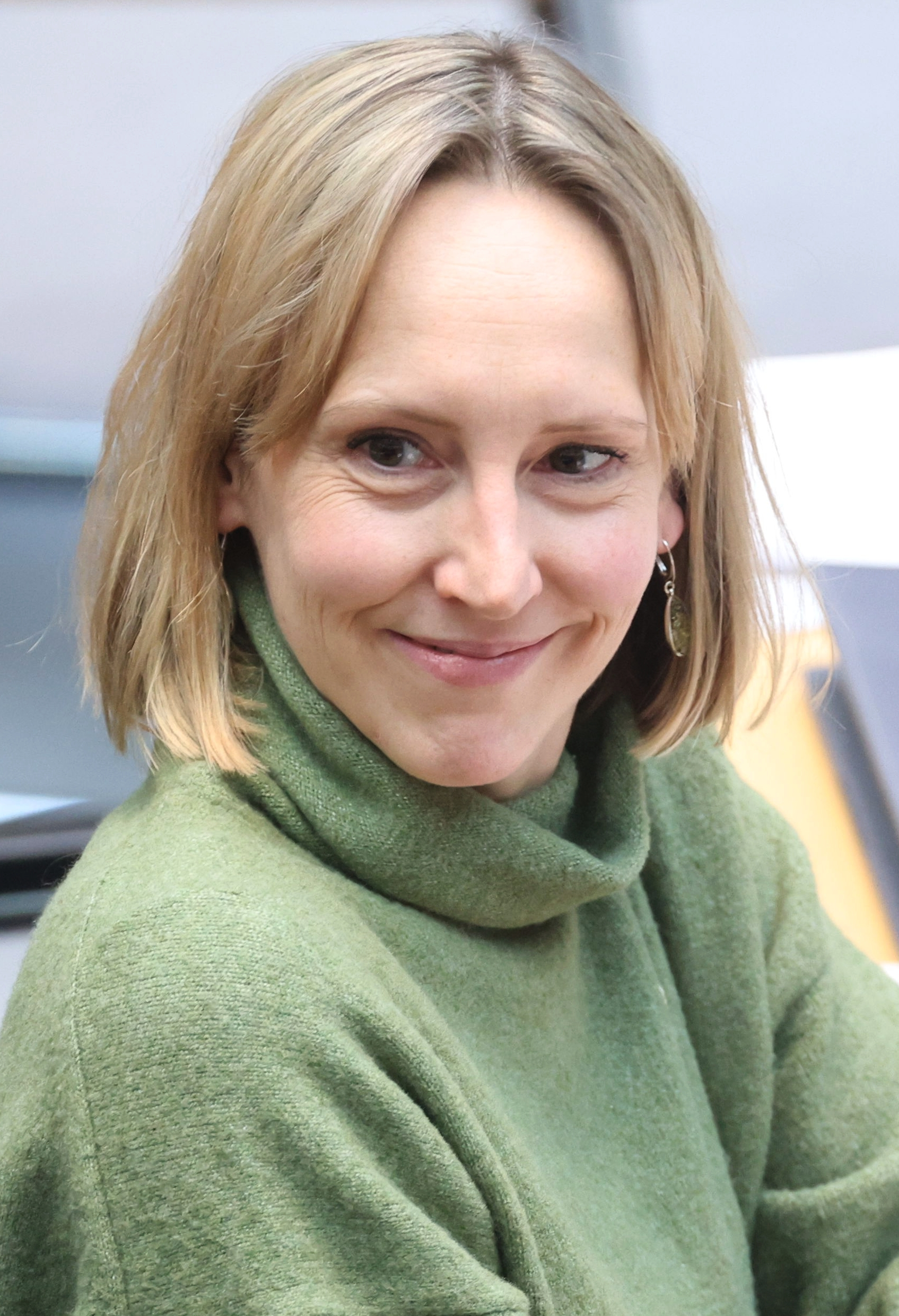
- Katharina Senge in 2024

Member of the Abgeordnetenhaus of Berlin
- Incumbent
- Assumed office 2023

Personal details
- Born: 1982 (age 43–44) Erfurt, Germany
- Party: Christian Democratic Union
- Website: https://www.katharina-senge.de/

Katharina Senge (born 1982) is a German politician from the Christian Democratic Union of Germany (CDU) and has been a member of the Abgeordnetenhaus of Berlin since 2023.

== Biography ==
Senge completed her Abitur (university entrance qualification) in Weimar. She then studied religious studies, political science, journalism, and communication studies in Berlin and Rome, graduating with a Master of Arts degree. From 2010 to 2016 and again in 2018, she worked for the Konrad Adenauer Foundation. From 2016 to 2021, she was a staff member of the CDU/CSU parliamentary group in the German Bundestag. From 2021 until her election to the Abgeordnetenhaus of Berlin in 2023, she worked as an advisor for the Federal Ministry for Economic Cooperation and Development.

Senge is Roman Catholic.

== Political career ==
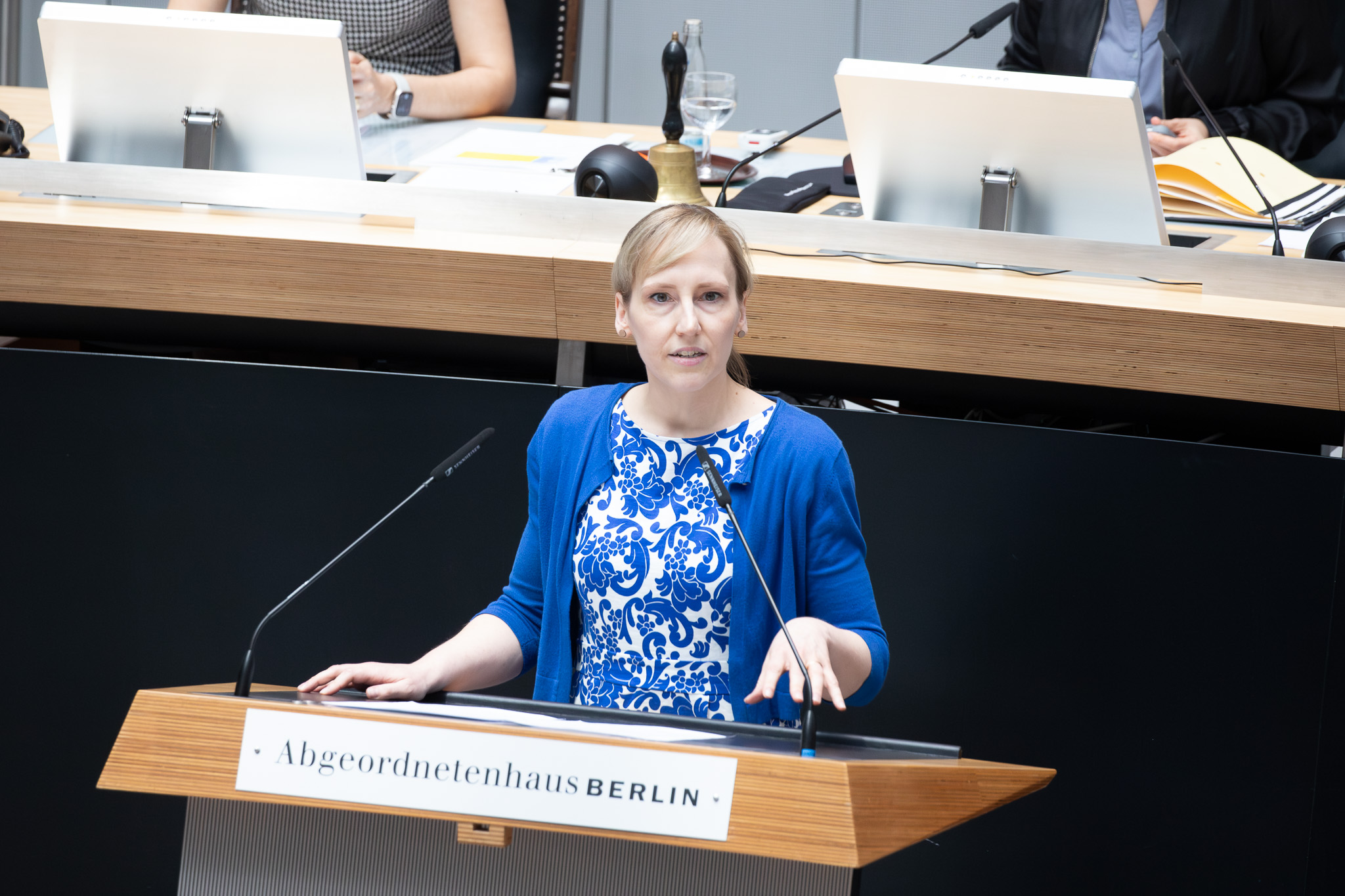
Katharina Senge speaking in 2024.

Senge is a member of the CDU. She ran in the 2021 Berlin state election and the 2023 repeat election in the Tempelhof-Schöneberg 1 constituency. She missed out on a seat in the Berlin state parliament in the 2021 election, but won a seat in the 2023 repeat election via the district list.

== See also ==
- List of members of the 19th Abgeordnetenhaus of Berlin (2023–2026)
