= After Capitalism (set index) =

After Capitalism may refer to:

- After Capitalism, 2013 book by Dada Maheshvarananda
- After Capitalism, 2002 book by David Schweickart
- After Capitalism: From Managerialism to Workplace Democracy, 2001 book by Seymour Melman
- After Capitalism, 2013 book by Michael Schluter
- After Capitalism: Horizons of Finance, Culture, and Citizenship, 2016 book by Kennan Ferguson and Patrice Petro
- After Capitalism, book by Michael Spence

== See also ==
- Post-capitalism
