= Tempelhof-Schöneberg 5 =

State electoral district of Germany

- Electoral district for the Berlin House of Representatives
- Tempelhof-Schöneberg 5 in 2026
- District: Tempelhof-Schöneberg
- Electorate: 33,239 (2026)

Current electoral district
- Party: CDU
- Member: Roman Simon

Tempelhof-Schöneberg 5 is an electoral constituency (German: Wahlkreis) represented in the House of Representatives of Berlin. It elects one member via first-past-the-post voting.

== Geography ==
The constituency comprises the districts of Tempelhof and Mariendorf on both sides of the Teltow Canal, and is entirely within the borough of Tempelhof-Schöneberg.

There were 33,239 eligible voters in 2026.

== Members ==
Election	Member	Party	%
1990	Klaus-Ulrich Reipert	CDU	
1995	Herwig Haase	CDU	51.2
1999	Uwe Schmidt	CDU	59.2
2001	Uwe Schmidt	CDU	41.2
2006	Frank Zummermann	SPD	36.8
2011	Frank Zummermann	SPD	33.8
2016	Frank Zummermann	SPD	27.8
2021	Lars Rauchfuß	SPD	28.0
2023	Roman Simon	CDU	40.3
2026	Roman Simon	CDU	24.9

== Election results ==
=== 2026 election ===
State election (2026): Tempelhof-Schöneberg 5
Notes:	Blue background denotes the winner of the electorate vote. Pink background denotes a candidate elected from their party list. Yellow background denotes an electorate win by a list member, or other incumbent. A ✓ or ✗ denotes status of any incumbent, win or lose respectively.						
Party	Candidate	Votes	%	±%	Party votes	%	±%
CDU	✓ Roman Simon	5,682	24.9	▼15.4	5,392	23.4	▼15.1
Left	Christoph Böltes	4,492	19.7	▲13.4	4,826	21.0	▲14.6
SPD	Sebastian Schlüsselburg	3,916	17.2	▼5.1	3,426	14.9	▼5.4
AfD	Frank-Christian Hansel	3,748	16.4	▲7.7	3,754	16.3	▲7.7
Greens	Dennis Matešković	2,710	11.9	▼0.6	2,503	10.9	▼1.2
BSW	Dominik Reuther	1,026	4.5		1,108	4.8	
FDP	Frank Röder	654	2.9	▼1.2	674	2.9	▼2.0
Tierschutzpartei					582	2.5	▼0.1
Volt	Niklas Kühne	559	2.5		409	1.8	▲1.1
PARTEI					159	0.7	▼0.4
PdF					73	0.3	
ÖDP					48	0.2	▲0.1
du.					31	0.1	Steady
DKP					10	0.0	Steady
SGP					9	0.0	Steady
Informal votes		532			315		
Total valid votes		22,787			23,004		
Turnout		23,319	70.2	▲10.3			
CDU hold	Majority	1,190	5.2	▼12.8			

=== 2023 repeat election ===
Changes denoted below for the 2023 election are compared to the 2016 election, as the 2021 election was declared invalid.

State election (2023): Tempelhof-Schöneberg 5
Notes:	Blue background denotes the winner of the electorate vote. Pink background denotes a candidate elected from their party list. Yellow background denotes an electorate win by a list member, or other incumbent. A ✓ or ✗ denotes status of any incumbent, win or lose respectively.						
Party	Candidate	Votes	%	±%	Party votes	%	±%
CDU	Roman Simon	7,768	40.3	▲14.2	7,423	38.5	▲14.7
SPD	Lars Rauchfuß	4,288	22.3	▼5.5	3,915	20.3	▼5.4
Greens	Dennis Matešković	2,404	12.5	▲0.5	2,334	12.1	▲1.3
AfD	Antonin Brousek	1,679	8.7	▼7.1	1,669	8.7	▼6.8
Left	Martin Rutsch	1,208	6.3	▼1.4	1,233	6.4	▼1.1
FDP	Holger Krestel	784	4.1	▼3.2	951	4.9	▼2.9
Tierschutzpartei	Johannes Markus Zonker	652	3.4		506	2.6	▲0.2
PARTEI	Richard Lucchesi	304	1.6		205	1.1	▼0.3
Team Todenhöfer					164	0.9	
Volt					131	0.7	
Gray Panthers					117	0.6	▼1.0
The Grays					104	0.5	
dieBasis	Jochen Rölle	130	0.7		88	0.5	
Pirates					81	0.4	▼1.1
Verjüngungsforschung					57	0.3	Steady
FW					44	0.2	
Humanists					37	0.2	
du.					33	0.2	
Klimaliste					30	0.2	
Mieterpartei					27	0.1	
ÖDP	Kirsten Jäkel	49	0.3		26	0.1	
MW					26	0.1	▼0.1
SGP					8	0.0	▼0.1
The Pinks/Alliance 21					8	0.0	
BüSo					5	0.0	▼0.1
LKR					5	0.0	▼0.4
Bergpartei, die ÜberPartei					4	0.0	
Informal votes		19,266			19,276		
Total valid votes		200			188		
Turnout		19,488	59.9	▼3.4			
CDU gain from SPD	Majority	3,480	18.0				

=== 2021 election (annulled) ===
The election in 2021 was annulled and rerun in 2023.

State election (2021): Tempelhof-Schöneberg 5
Notes:	Blue background denotes the winner of the electorate vote. Pink background denotes a candidate elected from their party list. Yellow background denotes an electorate win by a list member, or other incumbent. A ✓ or ✗ denotes status of any incumbent, win or lose respectively.						
Party	Candidate	Votes	%	±%	Party votes	%	±%
SPD	Lars Rauchfuß	6,460	28.0	▲0.2	5,926	25.6	▼0.1
CDU	Roman Simon	6,071	26.3	▲0.2	5,681	24.5	▲0.8
Greens	Dennis Matešković	3,250	14.1	▲2.1	3,090	13.3	▲2.6
AfD	Antonin Brousek	1,836	8.0	▼7.8	1,819	7.9	▼7.6
FDP	Holger Krestel	1,753	7.6	▲0.3	1,786	7.7	▼0.1
Left	Martin Rutsch	1,594	6.9	▼0.7	1,657	7.2	▼0.4
Tierschutzpartei	Johannes Markus Zonker	1,048	4.5		611	2.6	▲0.2
Team Todenhöfer					483	2.1	
PARTEI	Richard Lucchesi	054	2.2		370	1.6	▲0.2
dieBasis	Jochen Rölle	422	1.8		294	1.3	
FW					215	0.9	
The Grays					175	0.8	
Volt					175	0.8	
Gray Panthers					168	0.7	▼0.8
APT					144	0.6	
Pirates					110	0.5	▼1.0
Klimaliste					69	0.3	
Verjüngungsforschung					54	0.2	▼0.1
Mieterpartei					53	0.2	
Bildet Berlin!					43	0.2	
Humanists					41	0.2	
ÖDP	Kirsten Jäkel	115	0.5		40	0.2	
du.					29	0.1	
MW					28	0.1	▼0.2
NPD					21	0.1	▼0.3
BüSo					15	0.1	Steady
DKP					15	0.1	Steady
Bergpartei, die ÜberPartei					13	0.1	
The Pinks/Alliance 21					12	0.1	
LKR					9	0.0	▼0.4
SGP					2	0.0	▼0.1
Informal votes		366			280		
Total valid votes		23,053			23,148		
Turnout		23,475	71.5	▲8.2			
SPD hold	Majority	389	1.7				

== See also ==
- Politics of Berlin
- House of Representatives of Berlin
