= Kaosikii dance =

Indian dance invented by Prabhat Ranjan Sarkar

External videos
- YouTube video clips
- , December 8, 2012; 9:48; Kaos'ikii: Learn how to do the Yogic Dance

The Kaoshikii or Kaos'ikii dance is a dance invented on September 6, 1978 by the Indian philosopher and social reformer Prabhat Ranjan Sarkar aka Shrii Shrii Anandamurti (1921–1990).

Sarkar claims the kaos'ikii dance is a psycho-physical exercise which would benefit the mind by developing mental stamina and strength. Some hints to this dance are also contained in the speech "The Cosmic Father Has a Special Responsibility" given in Madras (India) on December 4, 1978 and later published in "Ánanda Vacanámrtam Part 6, Chapter 5" and "Discourses on Tantra Volume Two, Chapter 23".

== Etymology ==
“The name Kaoshikii comes from the Sanskrit word kosha, meaning “layer of mind”. Kaoshikii develops the subtler layers of mind, cultivating the feeling of mysticism – the endeavour to establish a link between the finite and the infinite – in one’s consciousness. It instils self-confidence and encourages self-expression."

== See also ==
- Ananda Marga
- Ananda Marga College
- Prabhat Ranjan Sarkar
