= After Capitalism =

2012 book by Dada Maheshvarananda

After Capitalism: Economic Democracy in Action
- Author: Dada Maheshvarananda
- Subject: Post-capitalism, Prout
- Genre: Non-fiction
- Publisher: Innerworld Publications
- Publication date: 2012
- Publication place: USA
- Pages: 390 pp
- ISBN: 978-1-881717-14-0
- Preceded by: After Capitalism: Prout’s Vision for a New World

After Capitalism: Economic Democracy in Action is a 2012 book by United States author Dada Maheshvarananda, an activist, yoga monk and writer. The book argues that global capitalism is terminally ill because it suffers from four fatal flaws: growing inequity and concentration of wealth, addiction to speculation instead of production, rising unsustainable debt and its tendency to exploit the natural environment.

The author proposes a grassroots movement for economic democracy with cooperatives and local economies based on the Progressive Utilization Theory or Prout, a post-capitalist model conceptualized by Prabhat Ranjan Sarkar of India. The book includes a conversation with Noam Chomsky and essays by Frei Betto, Johan Galtung, Leonardo Boff, Sohail Inayatullah, Marcos Arruda, Ravi Batra and others.

== Background ==
The author's first book, After Capitalism: Prout's Vision for a New World, with a preface by Noam Chomsky, was published in 2003 and, subsequently, translated into nine other languages. However, when the author started to update it, he discovered that both the world and the development of Prout had changed so much that more than 80 percent of the text was actually new material. Beyond this, economic democracy, a fundamental demand of Prout, was also starting to resonate with the Indignados Movement of Spain and the global Occupy Movement. Hence this book has a new title.

== Content ==
Chapter 1: The Failure of Global Capitalism and Economic Depressions: A brief review of colonialism, the economics of the Cold War, common practices by multinational corporations, the 2008 financial crisis, economic depressions and global capitalism's four fatal flaws. "How to Live Through Economic Turmoil" by Mark A. Friedman.

Chapter 2: A New Social Paradigm Based on Spiritual Values: An ecological and spiritual perspective, Prout's philosophical base, universal spirituality, the concept of Cosmic Inheritance, the problems with materialism, and Neohumanism. Definition of social progress, definition of the dynamic web of life or "Pramá", how it is lost and how it can be restored. The benefits of meditation for activists. "The Importance of Prout and its Concept of Pramá" by Dr. Leonardo Boff.

Chapter 3: The Right to Live!: The minimum necessities of life guaranteed to all, pharmaceutical corporations vs. generic medicines, comparing Prout to Marxism, Communism and Participatory Economics. The Five Fundamental Principles of Prout and how they can be used to evaluate social policies, factors that motivate people to work and economic indicators for setting the minimum and maximum wages. "Striving to Achieve Affordable Health Care for All in Kenya" by Didi Ananda Rucira.

Chapter 4: Economic Democracy: Industry, commerce and service in three levels, how to provide housing for all, economic decentralization and socio-economic regions, comparing the welfare economics of Amartya Sen to Prout. Barter trade, Prout's monetary system, taxation, "A Proutist Response to Land Value Capture" by Dr. John Gross.

Chapter 5: Cooperatives for a Better World: Human nature competitive or cooperative? Successful cooperatives around the world, the Mondragón cooperatives, how worker cooperatives function, what makes cooperatives successful? Examples of small-scale cooperatives in Maleny, Australia and the Venezuelan cooperative experience.

Chapter 6: An Agrarian Revolution and Environmental Protection: The deepening crisis in agriculture, food sovereignty, Prout's agrarian revolution, agricultural cooperatives, ideal farming and the benefits of growing your own food. Agro- and Agrico-Industries, the benefits of a balanced economy. Prout Master Units, community supported agriculture (CSA), the Food, Farms and Jobs program of Illinois. Endangered rainforests, forest preservation strategies, tribal knowledge of medicinal plants, the Future Vision Ecological Park in Brazil and a block-level planning exercise.

Chapter 7: A New Perspective on Class, Class Struggle and Revolution: History and the Social Cycle, bloodless revolution and armed struggle, a new vision of history. The Sarkar Game. The exploitation of women throughout history and today, and the awakening of women. "Comparing the Class Analysis of Marx and Sarkar" by Dr. Ravi Batra and "Prout's Social Cycle" by Dr. Johan Galtung.

Chapter 8: Spiritual Revolutionaries: Sarkar's vision of Sadvipras, spiritual activism, facing our shadows. Goodness, evil and how to train heroes. Emotionally intelligent leaders and how to inspire others and yourself. "Becoming Sadvipras" by Satya Tanner and "Prout Lessons from Development Work in West Africa" by Dada Daneshananda.

Chapter 9: A New Concept of Ethics And Justice: Increase in violent crime, ethics for personal and social transformation, cardinal human values as the basis for legal justice, restorative justice and re-education centers for personal transformation, transforming prisoners through yoga and meditation, drug abuse as a health issue.

Chapter 10: "Our Culture is Our Strength!" Cultural Identity and Education: Psychic exploitation, culture, civilization and pseudo-culture, an educational revolution, Neohumanist schools, local and global languages, mass movements and guerrilla street theater. "Future Tasmania" by Liila Hass and "Using Prout to Evaluate and Support a Community Samaja Movement: The Maya of Panimatzalam, Guatemala" by Dr. Matt Oppenheim

Chapter 11: Prout's Governance: Different views on governance, democratic reforms, constitutional proposals based on Prout, a universal bill of rights, world government. "Transformative Strategies and the Futures of the Prout Movement" by Dr. Sohail Inayatullah.

Chapter 12: A Call to Action: Strategies for Implementing Prout: "Another World is Possible!" Organizing marginalized farmers, how to be an ideal activist. The Prout Research Institute of Venezuela and the Prout Institute (Eugene, Oregon, USA). Model cooperatives and community service projects, mass movements, a popular youth movement in Hungary and protests against global capitalism. Hope for the future.

Chapter 13: A Conversation with Noam Chomsky: About The Occupy Movement, economic democracy and cooperatives, limiting the accumulation of wealth, consciousness raising, and Latin America.

Afterword: "The Possibility of Creating Another World is in Our Hands" by Frei Betto.

Appendices: Discussion questions about the book, designing Prout Study Action Circles, Prout slogans.

== See also ==
- Criticism of capitalism
- Dada Maheshvarananda
- Post-capitalism
- Prabhat Ranjan Sarkar
- PROUT
