= Ananda Nagar, Purulia =

Ananda Nagar
- Village
- Location in West Bengal, India Ananda Nagar (India)
- Coordinates: 23.5055°N 86.0763°E
- Country: India
- State: West Bengal
- District: Purulia

Languages
  - Official: Bengali, English
- Time zone: UTC+5:30 (IST)
- PIN: 723 215 (Baglata)
- Lok Sabha constituency: Purulia
- Vidhan Sabha constituency: Joypur
- Website: purulia.gov.in
- Places in Jhalda subdivision in Purulia district. Key: M: municipality, C: census town, R: rural/ urban centre, H: historical/ religious centre, X: craft centre, T: tourist centre, △: hills Owing to space constraints in the small map, the locations in the larger map on click through may vary slightly.

Ananda Nagar is a village and higher education centre in the Joypur CD block in the Jhalda subdivision of the Purulia district in the state of West Bengal, India.

== History ==
Prabhat Ranjan Sarkar (Shrii Shrii Anandamurti), founder of the Ananda Marga, coined the name Ananda Nagar and set up Ananda Nagar as headquarters of Ananda Marg Gurukul, with the objective of developing a university and a township. Asthi Pahad, a hill south-west of Ananda Nagar, contains ancient fossils. Maharshi Kapila was born at Pat Jhalda, 23 km (14 mi) south-west of Ananda Nagar, 3,500 years ago. Baglata, which now has a post office, means the abode of tigers in creepers and shrubs.

== Geography ==
=== Location ===
Ananda Nagar is located at 23.5055°N 86.0763°E.

Ananda Nagar is not identified as a separate inhabited settlement in the 2011 census.

=== Area overview ===
Purulia district forms the lowest step of the Chota Nagpur Plateau. The general scenario is undulating land with scattered hills. Jhalda subdivision, shown in the map alongside, is located in the western part of the district, bordering Jharkhand. The Subarnarekha flows along a short stretch of its western border. It is an overwhelmingly rural subdivision with 91.02% of the population living in the rural areas and 8.98% living in the urban areas. There are three census towns in the subdivision. The map alongside shows some of the tourist attractions in the Ajodhya Hills. The area is home to Purulia Chhau dance with spectacular masks made at Charida. The remnants of old temples and deities are found in the subdivision also, as in other parts of the district.

== Transport ==
There is a station at Pundag on the NSC Bose Gomoh-Hatia line of the South Eastern Railway.

== Education ==
Anandanagar is the headquarter of Ananda Marga Board of Education called Ananda Marga Gurukula (AMGK) AMGK was envisioned as a multi-faculty global university by its founder Shrii Shrii Anandamurtiji. All educational institutions started by Ananda Marga are affiliated to AMGK.

Ananda Marga College was established in 1966. Affiliated with the Sidho Kanho Birsha University, it offers honours courses in Bengali, English, history, geography, and general courses in arts and science. It has separate hostel for boys and girls. Over the years the college has provided higher education to students from poor families living in 60 villages around Ananda Nagar.

Ananda Marga Gurukula Teacher's Training College received formal approval in 2014.

Ananda Marga High School is a Bengali-medium boys only institution established in 1964. It has facilities for teaching from class V to class X.

== Healthcare ==
The Ananda Marga mission runs a 36-bed hospital.
