= Bijon Setu massacre =

1982 murder of monks and a nun in India

The Bijon Setu massacre (Bengali: বিজন সেতু হত্যাকাণ্ড) refers to the killing of 16 sadhus and a sadhvi of the Ananda Marga, at Bijon Setu, West Bengal, India, on 30 April 1982. The killings remain unresolved, with no convictions, and continue to be the subject of political controversy.

== Background ==
Ananda Marga, is an ultra-right wing socio-religious organization. Critics have alleged the cult-like organization maintained paramilitary tendencies and political aspirations, while supporters describe it as a socio-spiritual movement engaged in education and welfare. The organization engaged in public processions carrying skulls and swords, and were also reported to charge police officers with swords.

The organisation had earlier been linked both by state authorities and international authorities to incidents of violence and conspiracy, including assassination of Railway Minister L.N. Mishra in 1975, the Sydney Hilton Hotel bombing in 1978.

Residents of Ballygunge and Kasba reported that, in the weeks preceding the incident, rumours related to child abduction had been widely circulating in the area.

== Incident ==
On 30 April 1982, members of Ananda Marga were travelling to an educational conference in Tiljala when they were stopped at three points at Bondel Gate, Bijon Setu and Ballygunge railway station in Kolkata. They were forcibly removed from vehicles, assaulted by crowds, and set on fire. It was reported that the murders took place in broad daylight and were witnessed by many people.

== Press coverage ==
A week after the incident, The Statesman Weekly, a leading Calcutta newspaper in 1982, reported that "seventeen Ananda Margis, two of them women, were killed on April 30 morning by frenzied mobs at three places in South Calcutta on the suspicion that they were child-lifters".

The story sent out by United Press International added that two of the nuns who were killed were "seen carrying a child near a railway station".

As part of its initial coverage, The Statesman Weekly reported the state's chief minister's suspicions that the attack had been staged to embarrass the party in power before the upcoming election. Ananda Marga blamed the attack on the Communist Party of India (Marxist) (CPI(M)). While this accusation was repeated for many years, recent Ananda Marga scholarship assumes the mob was motivated by unfounded allegations of child kidnapping.

== Investigation and aftermath ==
Initial reports said that more than 106 people were arrested in the first week after the incident. On 4th May, Jyoti Basu, Chief Minister of West Bengal at the time formed the Deb Commission to investigate the murders. But the Ananda Margis rejected the state enquiry commission and demanded Central Govt to form an enquiry commission. The Central govt rejected this demand.

The National Human Rights Commission took up the investigation in 1996, but did not make much progress. On 30 April 1999, the Ananda Marga Pracharaka Samgha (AMPS) demanded a high-level judicial probe led by a working Supreme Court judge into the killing of Ananda Margis. On 30 April 2004, Ananda Marga held the first rally in Calcutta commemorating the massacre without the need to acquire a court order for permission. The group continues to block the bridge and surrounding areas on 30 April every year with a procession.

Ananda Marga were also involved in the Purulia Arms Drop Case, in a conspiracy to overthrow the Left Front govt of West Bengal in 1995.

After the Trinamool Congress came to power, the Amitabh Lala Commission of Inquiry, a single-member judicial commission under the supervision of Amitabh Lala, a former judge of the Calcutta High Court, was formed in March 2012 to investigate the killings after repeated appeals for a formal judicial inquiry. The Commission has not submitted any report till date.
