= Bijon Setu =

Bridge in Kolkata

Bijon Setu is a road bridge situated above Ballygunge Junction railway station connects EM Bypass through Kasba with Gariahat.

== History ==
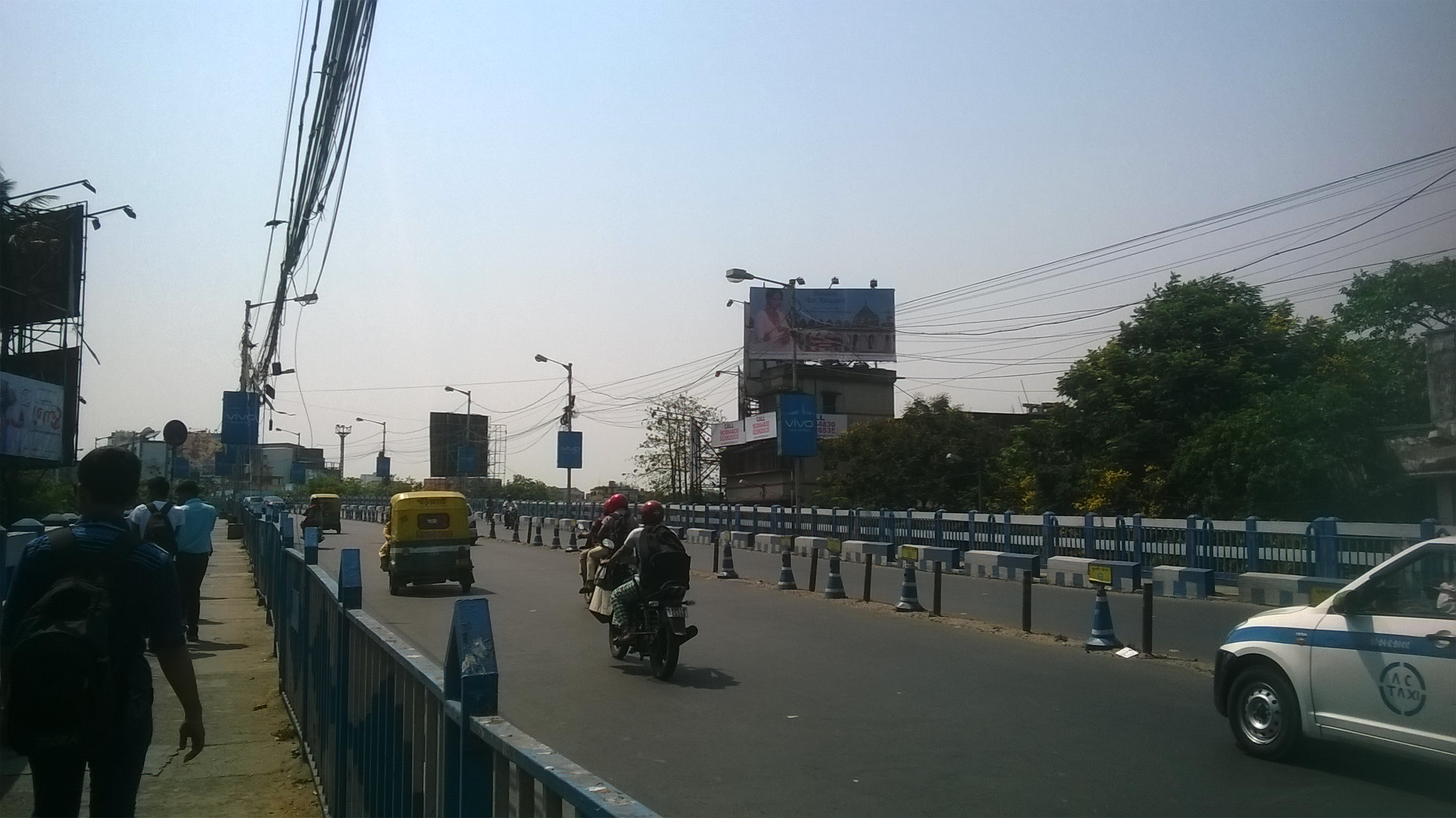
Bijon Setu

The bridge is named after a Bengali engineer Bijon Basu. 35 year old Basu was an executive engineer of then Calcutta Improvement Trust. On 2 August 1974, while he was returning home from Santoshpur to Sealdah, a gang of robbers got on the train and looted passengers. Basu protested but the robbers stabbed him and threw him out from the running train beside Ballygunge railway station. The bridge was established in 1978.

== 1982 massacre ==
16 monks and one nun of a Hindu organization Ananda Marga religious sect were lynched and burnt alive near Bijon Setu in the morning of 30 April 1982. This incident was called as Bijon Setu massacre.
