= Prabhat Samgiita =

Song composed by Prabhat Ranjan Sarkar

Prabháta Saḿgiita (Bengali: প্রভাত সঙ্গীত Probhat Shongit, Bengali pronunciation: [pɾɔbhat ʃɔŋɡit]), also known as Songs of a New Dawn or Prabhat's Songs, are the collection of songs composed by Prabhat Ranjan Sarkar. Sarkar composed a total of 5,018 songs, including the lyrics and the melody, over a period of eight years from 1982 until his death in 1990. While most songs are in the Bengali language, some are in Hindi, English, Sanskrit, Urdu, Magahi, Maithili and Angika. Prabháta Saḿgiita is also sometimes considered to be a post-Tagore gharana (school of music). The poetry of lyrics expresses elements of love, mysticism, devotion, neohumanism and revolution and the songs present a wide spectrum of both Eastern and Western melodic styles.

== Etymology ==
In Bengali, the word prabhát(a) (প্রভাত - Bengali pronunciation: [pɾɔbhat̪]) means dawn, morning or daybreak. The word sauṋgiit(a) (সঙ্গীত - Bengali pronunciation: [ʃɔŋɡit̪]) also spelled saḿgiit(a) (সংগীত - Bengali pronunciation: [ʃɔŋɡɡit̪]) means song and music. Thus, prabhát(a) sauṋgiit(a) or prabhát(a) saḿgiit(a) etymologically means "morning song" or "songs of dawn". It has also been interpreted as "songs of a new dawn". Irrelevant of the etymology, Prabhát(a) being the name of the composer, signifies "songs of Prabhat Ranjan Sarkar"

== Name and variants ==
Prabhát Saḿgiit has two most commonly used definitions, namely: "Songs of a New Dawn" and "Songs of Prabhat". It has many spelling variants, with the following reasons: the word saḿgiit has two different spellings in Bengali, there is no fix transliteration rule for most Indian languages, there are also different transcription conventions used in English for Indian languages, the Sanskrit pronunciation has an "a" at the end of both words, which is normally silent in Bengali and Hindi.

Thus, we have the word prabhat that can be spelled as:

- Prabhat, Prabhát, Prabhāt, Prabhata, Prabháta, Prabhāta

And we have the word samgiit that can be spelled as:

- Sangit, Sangeet, Sangiit, Samgiit, Saḿgiit, Saṃgīt, Sauṋgiit, Saŋgīt and all of these with "a" at the end:
- Sangita, Sangeeta, Sangiita, Samgiita, Saḿgiita, Saṃgīta, Sauṋgiita and Saŋgīta

If combined, all these variations could create a huge number of spelling variants for Prabhat Samgiit, however not all combinations are used. Subhas Sarkar mainly prefers the variant Prabháta Saḿgiita and sometimes uses Prabhāta saṃgīta. There is no consistency of spelling, even within the same newspapers. The Hindu often spells Prabhat Samgiita however also spells Prabhat Sangit and also Prabhat Sangeet. The Times of India uses both Prabhat Samgiita and Prabhat Sangeet. Most other newspapers spell Prabhat Sangeet, though some articles prefer Prabhat Sangit and Prabhata Samgiita. Publications of Ananda Marga usually goes by the spelling Prabháta Saḿgiita and also often by Prabhát Saḿgiita and Prabhát Saḿgiit. Older publications, however, tend to use the variant Prabhát Sauṋgiit or Prabháta Sauṋgiita. Finally there are instances of unusual spellings as well, such as Prabhat Sangeeth and Prabhat Samhitta.

== Composition, Collection and Releases ==
P. R. Sarkar composed the first prabhat samgiita Bandhu he niye calo in Bengali on 14 September 1982 at Deoghar, India. He continued composing songs until his death on 21 October 1990. During that eight years, he composed a total of 5,018 prabhat samgiits, of which almost all in Bengali including the lyrics and the tunes. The last prabhat samgiit, Ámrá gaŕe nova gurukul, was composed on 20 October 1990, one day before his death

Sarkar created the Ananda Marga organization in 1955 and by 1973 Ananda Marga Publications was established to translate and distribute his work as well as works relating to Sarkar. The multivolume English/Bengali edition was published in 1993 and two smaller volumes of selected works in English followed. Another Ananda Marga-affiliated group, the Renaissance Artists and Writers Association (RAWA), has sponsored several performances and recordings of selected songs. These performances have featured artists such as Acarya Tattvavedananda Avadhuta, Acarya Priyashivananda Avadhuta, Madhuri Chattopadhyay, Srikanto Acharya, Arundhati Holme Chowdhury, Ramkumar Chattopadhyay, Ashwini Bhide-Deshpande, Rashid Khan, Kavita Krishnamurthy, Manoj Kumar, Vithal Rao, Shruti Sadolikar, Haimanti Sukla, Archana Udupa, Sreeradha Bandyopadhyay, Sadhana Sargam, Shreya Ghoshal and Sonu Nigam.

== See also ==
- Music of Bengal
- Music of West Bengal
