= Ananda Marga College =

College in West Bengal, India

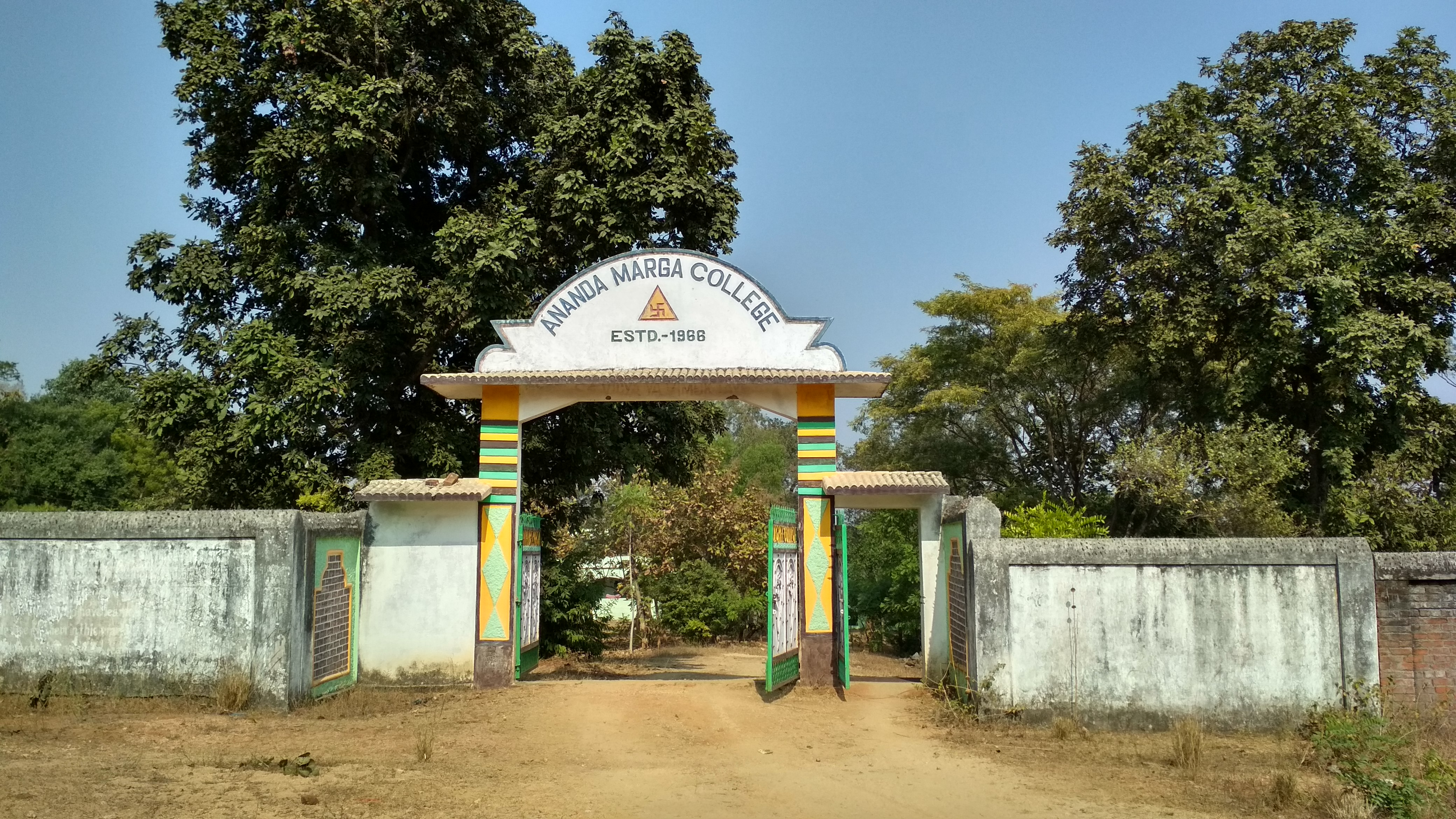
- Ananda Marga college gate
- Type: Undergraduate college
- Established: 1966; 60 years ago
- Founders: Prabhat Ranjan Sarkar
- Affiliations: Sidho Kanho Birsha University
- Location: Rotunda Road, Baglata, Ananda Nagar, Purulia, West Bengal, 723215, India; 23.5025729°N 86.0721893°E
- Campus: Rural
- Website: anandamargacollege.org
- Location in West Bengal Ananda Marga College (India)

Ananda Marga College, established in 1966, is one of the oldest college in Purulia district, at Ananda Nagar, Pundag. It offers undergraduate courses in arts and sciences. It is affiliated to Sidho Kanho Birsha University.

== Departments ==
- Graduation / Degree - Pass & Honours course
- Skill Development Course
- Yoga & Meditation Course
- Diploma Course

=== Science ===
- Chemistry
- Physics
- Mathematics
- Biology

=== Arts ===
- Bengali
- Santali
- English
- Sanskrit
- Hindi
- History
- Geography
- Political science
- Philosophy

== Campus Facilities ==
- Library - A library with collection of more than 7000 books.
- Auditorium - A auditorium with 800 seating capacity. All the programs, seminars and functions are hosted here.
- Playground - for different sports, games and tournaments.
- Labs - Laboratory facilities for subjects like geography, computer, biology, chemistry and physics are available.
- Hostel - The college has hostel facility for Boys. There are two boys’ hostels, each seating 20-40 students.
- Scholarship - Many "government scholarship scheme's are applicable to the students. Hostel stipend is applicable to students who opt for College Hostel during admission time.
- RAGGING - RAGGING in any form is banned inside and outside the campus. Strict action will be taken against those indulging in ragging. Suspension and or withdrawal from the hostel/college is one of the actions taken immediately. Supreme court has also defined ragging as a criminal offense.

== Accreditation ==
The college is recognized by the University Grants Commission (UGC).

== Location ==
The college is located in Baglata, Ananda Nagar, Purulia, in the district of Purulia, 2 km (1.2 mi) away from the Pundag Railway Station of SER zone. Ananda Nagar is situated in the north-eastern part of India, in the heart of Rarh. Rarh was the starting point of civilization and was once covered by dense forests. Asthi Pahar (Fossil Hill), contains ancient Dinosaur Fossils. 3,500 years ago, The great Maharshi Kapila was born close by in Jhalda. Maharshi Kapila was not only the first philosopher of the world but also the inventor of algebra and geometry.

Ananda Nagar, Purulia, is a land without time, a place where it's sweet and mystic beauty stands as a witness for the human drama of existence. Living in one of the forgotten areas of India, the lives here move around basic rural activities. The Central Master Unit of Ananda Marga is a growing educational-cum-agricultural complex with over 1200 acres of land in a land of ancient hills, 7 pristine rivers and rivulets and radiant red soil. Today, Ananda Nagar is a dreamland, the dreamland for seekers of peace and tranquillity, the dreamland of educators of teachers and education-conscious students and guardians.

== See also ==
- Ananda Marga missions
- List of institutions of higher education in West Bengal
- Education in India
- Education in West Bengal
