= Tempelhof-Schöneberg 1 =

State electoral district of Germany

- Electoral district for the Berlin House of Representatives
- Tempelhof-Schöneberg 1 in 2026
- District: Tempelhof-Schöneberg
- Electorate: 35,034 (2026)

Current electoral district
- Party: Green
- Member: Stephan Standfuß

Tempelhof-Schöneberg 1 is an electoral constituency (German: Wahlkreis) represented in the House of Representatives of Berlin. It elects one member via first-past-the-post voting.

== Geography ==
The constituency comprises the northern tip of Schöneberg, including Wittenbergplatz, Viktoria-Luise-Platz, Nollendorfplatz, Winterfeldtplatz, Bülowstraße, and Potsdamer Straße, entirely within the borough of Tempelhof-Schöneberg.

There were 35,034 eligible voters in 2026.

== Members ==
Election	Member	Party	%
1990	Christa-Maria Blankenburg	CDU	42.1
1995	Rüdiger Jakesch	CDU	37.8
1999	Rüdiger Jakesch	CDU	42.4
2001	Annette Fugmann-Heesing	SPD	42.9
2006	Annette Fugmann-Heesing	SPD	38.5
2011	Thomas Birk	Greens	32.1
2016	Notker Schweikhardt	Greens	29.4
2021	Sebastian Walter	Greens	33.2
2023	Sebastian Walter	Greens	34.4
2026	Sebastian Walter	Greens	27.4

== Election results ==
=== 2026 election ===
State election (2026): Tempelhof-Schöneberg 1
Notes:	Blue background denotes the winner of the electorate vote. Pink background denotes a candidate elected from their party list. Yellow background denotes an electorate win by a list member, or other incumbent. A ✓ or ✗ denotes status of any incumbent, win or lose respectively.						
Party	Candidate	Votes	%	±%	Party votes	%	±%
Greens	✓ Sebastian Walter	7,275	27.4	▼7.0	5,897	22.1	▼9.0
Left	Elisabeth Staudt	6,915	26.1	▲15.0	7,921	29.7	▲17.4
CDU	Katharina Senge	4,420	16.7	▼5.4	4,503	16.9	▼4.2
SPD	Wiebke Neumann	3,698	13.9	▼7.0	3,600	13.5	▼5.8
AfD	Christoph Schröter	1,782	6.7	▲2.9	1,843	6.9	▲2.9
BSW	Cajus Pietschmann	882	3.3		1,051	3.9	
Volt	Rahel Demant	580	2.2		629	2.4	▲1.1
FDP	Reinhard Frede	544	2.1	▼2.1	651	2.4	▼2.3
Tierschutzpartei	Nico Poschinski	414	1.6		308	1.2	▼0.2
PARTEI					142	0.5	▼0.6
PdF					57	0.2	
du.					31	0.1	▼0.1
ÖDP					24	0.1	Steady
DKP					17	0.1	▼0.1
SGP					7	0.0	Steady
Informal votes		357			186		
Total valid votes		26,510			26,681		
Turnout		26,867	76.7	▲12.4			
Greens hold	Majority	360	1.3	▼19.1			

=== 2023 repeat election ===
Changes denoted below for the 2023 election are compared to the 2016 election, as the 2021 election was declared invalid.

State election (2023): Tempelhof-Schöneberg 1
Notes:	Blue background denotes the winner of the electorate vote. Pink background denotes a candidate elected from their party list. Yellow background denotes an electorate win by a list member, or other incumbent. A ✓ or ✗ denotes status of any incumbent, win or lose respectively.						
Party	Candidate	Votes	%	±%	Party votes	%	±%
Greens	Sebastian Walter	7,370	34.4	▲5.0	6,680	31.1	▲5.1
CDU	Katharina Senge	4,719	22.0	▲7.5	4,529	21.1	▲8.3
SPD	Wiebke Neumann	4,480	20.9	▼5.7	4,135	19.3	▼5.9
Left	Friederike Benda	2,371	11.1	▼1.2	2,644	12.3	▼1.4
FDP	Helge Buckow	880	4.1	▼2.5	1,012	4.7	▼3.2
AfD	Hermann-Josef Merting	828	3.9	▼3.9	864	4.0	▼3.8
Tierschutzpartei					291	1.4	▲0.1
Volt					273	1.3	
PARTEI	Malina Milluks	366	1.7		244	1.1	▼0.5
Team Todenhöfer					128	0.6	
dieBasis	Claudia Buthenhoff-Duffy	138	0.6		102	0.5	
Klimaliste					91	0.4	
Pirates	Alexander Spies	134	0.6	▼2.0	74	0.3	▼1.4
Gray Panthers					56	0.3	▼0.3
du.					51	0.2	
FW	Mario Rhode	132	0.6		36	0.2	
The Grays					35	0.2	
Humanists					31	0.1	
DKP					28	0.1	Steady
Verjüngungsforschung					26	0.1	▼0.1
Mieterpartei					24	0.1	
MW					21	0.1	▼0.1
Bergpartei, die ÜberPartei					16	0.1	
Bildet Berlin!					14	0.1	
SGP					14	0.1	▼0.1
LKR					11	0.1	▼0.3
ÖDP					10	0.0	
NPD					8	0.0	▼0.1
BüSo					4	0.0	Steady
The Pinks/Alliance 21					3	0.0	
Informal votes		21,418			21,455		
Total valid votes		153			120		
Turnout		21,596	64.3	▼4.0			
Greens hold	Majority	2,651	22.4				

=== 2021 election (annulled) ===
The election in 2021 was annulled and rerun in 2023.

State election (2021): Tempelhof-Schöneberg 1
Notes:	Blue background denotes the winner of the electorate vote. Pink background denotes a candidate elected from their party list. Yellow background denotes an electorate win by a list member, or other incumbent. A ✓ or ✗ denotes status of any incumbent, win or lose respectively.						
Party	Candidate	Votes	%	±%	Party votes	%	±%
Greens	Sebastian Walter	8,552	33.2	▲3.8	7,738	29.9	▲3.8
SPD	Wiebke Neumann	5,946	23.1	▼3.6	5,316	20.5	▼4.6
CDU	Katharina Senge	3,933	15.3	▲0.7	3,585	13.8	▲1.0
Left	Friederike Benda	3,029	11.7	▼0.6	3,561	13.7	▲0.1
FDP	Helge Buckow	1,652	6.4	▼0.2	1,851	7.1	▼0.8
AfD	Hermann-Josef Merting	916	3.6	▼4.2	951	3.7	▼4.2
Volt					476	1.8	
Team Todenhöfer					386	1.5	
Tierschutzpartei	?	501	1.9		346	1.3	▲0.1
dieBasis	Claudia Buthenhoff-Duffy	453	1.8		371	1.4	
PARTEI	Malina Milluks	442	1.7		372	1.4	▼0.3
Klimaliste					214	0.8	
FW	Mario Rhode	205	0.8		151	0.6	
Pirates	Alexander Spies	153	0.6	▼2.0	94	0.4	▼1.4
The Grays					71	0.3	
Gray Panthers					69	0.3	▼0.3
Humanists					48	0.2	
APT					47	0.2	
Mieterpartei					46	0.2	
du.					46	0.2	
ÖDP					30	0.1	
Verjüngungsforschung					26	0.1	▼0.1
DKP					22	0.1	▼0.1
MW					21	0.1	▼0.2
Bildet Berlin!					19	0.1	
Bergpartei, die ÜberPartei					17	0.1	
NPD					13	0.1	▼0.1
LKR					7	0.0	▼0.3
The Pinks/Alliance 21					4	0.0	
SGP					3	0.0	▼0.1
BüSo					1	0.0	Steady
Informal votes		231			205		
Total valid votes		25,782			25,902		
Turnout		26,141	77.4	▲9.1			
Greens hold	Majority	2,606	10.1				

== See also ==
- Politics of Berlin
- House of Representatives of Berlin
