= Human World (political party) =

Spiritual minor party in Germany

Human World Menschliche Welt
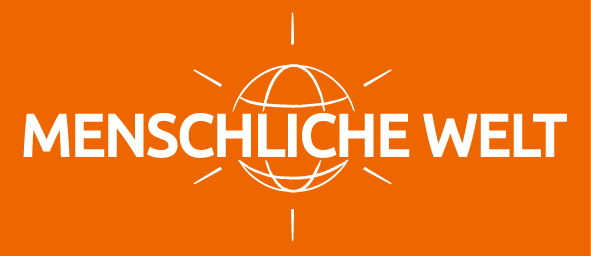
- Abbreviation: MW
- Chairperson: Sahin Azbak
- Deputy Chairperson: Dominik Laur
- Founded: 8 September 2013; 11 years ago
- Membership (2024): 660
- Ideology: Progressive utilization theory Economy for the Common Good
- Colours: Orange
- Bundestag: 0 / 736
- State parliaments: 0 / 1,894
- European Parliament: 0 / 96

Website
- www.menschlichewelt.de

Human World – For the Well-Being and Happiness of All (German: Menschliche Welt – für das Wohl und Glücklichsein aller, mostly known by the abbreviated name Menschliche Welt) is a spiritual minor political party in Germany.

== Policies ==
The Human World was founded in 2013 with the intention of working towards the formation of a global human society. A prerequisite for human society, according to the party, is an all-encompassing benevolent way of thinking and acting on the part of leaders. This is why one of Human World's main points is to support people to develop altruistic behavior and leadership skills. One of its main topics is the abolition of macro-farms. According to its own statements, it advocates the elimination of the causes of migration in order to overcome the refugee crisis. It sees wars as one of the causes, which is why the party has rejected the deployment of German troops in the Syrian war. In addition, it wants to massively reduce armaments production and arms exports, instead promoting exports of technical assistance for developing countries, while ensuring no job losses from arms conversion. The party advocates the establishment of education councils to develop integral concepts for school education throughout Germany. The party supports and has been an active part of the Querdenken movement.

== Electoral results ==
Year	(Germany) DE	(European Union) EU	(Baden-Württemberg) BW	(Bavaria) BY	(Berlin) BE	(Brandenburg) BB	(Bremen (state)) HB	(Hamburg) HH	(Hesse) HE	(Lower Saxony) NI	(Mecklenburg-Vorpommern) MV	(North Rhine-Westphalia) NW	(Rhineland-Palatinate) RP	(Saarland) SL	(Saxony) SN	(Saxony-Anhalt) ST	(Schleswig-Holstein) SH	(Thuringia) TH
2013																		
2014																		
2015																		
2016			▲0.02		▲0.1													
2017	▲0.03		▲0.02		▲0.1													
2018	▲0.03		▲0.02		▲0.1				▲0.1									
2019	▲0.03	▲0.09	▲0.02		▲0.1		▲0.2		▲0.1									▲0.0
2020	▲0.03	▲0.09	▲0.02		▲0.1		▲0.2	▲0.0	▲0.1									▲0.0
2021	▼0.01	▲0.09	▼0.0		▼0.0		▲0.2	▲0.0	▲0.1									▲0.0
2022	▼0.01	▲0.09	▼0.0		▼0.0		▲0.2	▲0.0	▲0.1			▲0.0						▲0.0
2023	▼0.01	▲0.09	▼0.0		0.0			▲0.0				▲0.0						▲0.0
2024	▼0.01	▲0.14	▼0.0		0.0	TBA		▲0.0				▲0.0			TBA			TBA
Year	(Germany) DE	(European Union) EU	(Baden-Württemberg) BW	(Bavaria) BY	(Berlin) BE	(Brandenburg) BB	(Bremen (state)) HB	(Hamburg) HH	(Hesse) HE	(Lower Saxony) NI	(Mecklenburg-Vorpommern) MV	(North Rhine-Westphalia) NW	(Rhineland-Palatinate) RP	(Saarland) SL	(Saxony) SN	(Saxony-Anhalt) ST	(Schleswig-Holstein) SH	(Thuringia) TH
