= Progressive utilization theory =

Socioeconomic and political philosophy

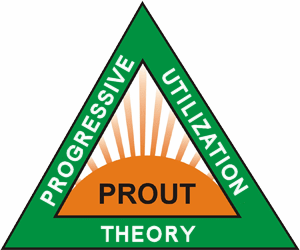
Progressive utilization theory logo

The Progressive utilization theory (PROUT) is a socioeconomic and political philosophy created by the Indian philosopher and spiritual leader Prabhat Ranjan Sarkar. He first conceived of PROUT in 1959. Its proponents (Proutists) claim that it exposes and overcomes the limitations of capitalism, communism and mixed economy. Since its genesis, PROUT has had an economically progressive approach, aiming to improve social development in the world. It is in line with Sarkar's Neohumanist values which aim to provide "proper care" to every being on the planet, including humans, animals and plants.

PROUT has not been implemented in any part of the world, though there are a number of books and articles on the subject.

== History ==
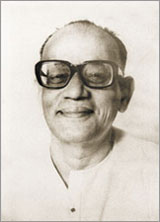
P.R. Sarkar, propounder of PROUT

In 1959, Sarkar started to develop the ideas of Prout. In 1961, the theory was formally outlined in his book Ananda Sutram, published under his spiritual name Shrii Shrii Ánandamúrti.

A number of organizations have been created for the promotion and dissemination of Prout, such as Proutist Universal, Prout Globe, Prout Institute, etc. Since the 1980s a number of cooperative communities have been established across the world by Ananda Marga in an attempt to provide ideal models for the society outlined in Prout.

== Theory ==
=== Overview ===
Prout proposes a socioeconomic system that is an advancement on capitalism and, what Prout sees as "the largely outdated" system of communism. Under the system, resources would be collective property from which usufructuary rights are carved out for use by individuals or groups of individuals. Distribution of goods in a market has to be rational and equitable, so that the allocation of a good maximizes the physical, mental, and spiritual development of all people. There must always be a baseline distribution that intends to guarantee food, clothing, shelter, education, and medical care (what the theory regards as minimum requirements for humans).

Prout advocates a three-tiered approach to industrial organization. Key industries and public utilities would operate on a no profit - no loss basis as these are resources held on trust for the public. Decentralized industry run by cooperatives would provide people's minimum necessities and other amenities of life. The majority of economic transactions would be through producers' and consumers' cooperatives. Incentives for people serving society would be funded via surpluses. A small business sector would also operate providing goods and services on a more individualized basis.

At the political level, Prout discourages nationalism, though nation-states would form a world government in the form of a confederation. There would be a world constitution and a bill of rights for human being, and for ensuring the biological diversity and security of animals and plants. Locally governed self-sufficient socio-economic units or zones would support a decentralized economy.

=== Law of social cycle and governance ===
Prout takes account of Sarkar's law of social cycle. It sees the social order as consisting of four classes of people that cyclically dominate society: shudras (workers), kshatriyas (warriors), vipras (intellectuals) and vaishyas (acquisitors).

However, Prout does not seek the abolition of these four classes, as it sees them as "... not merely as a power configuration, but as a way of knowing the world, as a paradigm, episteme or deep structure if you will." It considers that any person can be worker, warrior, intellectual or acquisitive minded.

Prout sees the four classes as connected to cyclic processes across time. That when a class of people struggle and rise to power they cause a revolution in the physical and mental world. To prevent any social class from clinging to political power and exploiting the others, a "spiritual elite" sadvipras (etymologically sad – true, vipra – intellectual) would determine who will hold political leadership. Prout theorises that the first sadvipras would come from disgruntled middle-class intellectuals and warriors.

Sadvipras would be organized into executive, legislative, and judicial boards which would be governed by a Supreme Board. They would be responsible for the order of dominance within the social order.

=== Neohumanism ===
The Prout theory is inline with Sarkar's Neohumanism philosophy. The philosophy is a reinterpretation of humanism integrating the idea of unity of all life. In it all living beings belong to a universal family deserving equal care and respect.

=== The five fundamental principles ===
In 1962, Prout was formally outlined in sixteen aphorisms (see Chapter 5 of Ananda Sutram). The last five aphorisms (5:12-16) are commonly referred to as the five fundamental principles of Prout. These five principles are deemed to be fundamental because it would be difficult to get a clear understanding of Prout without comprehending the underlying concepts of these principles, the interrelationship of the principles, and their respective areas of application.

The five aphorisms from Ananda Sutram translate into English as follows:

1. There should be no accumulation of wealth without the permission of society.
2. There should be maximum utilization and rational distribution of the crude, subtle, and causal resources.
3. There should be maximum utilization of the physical, mental, and spiritual potentialities of the individual and collective beings.
4. There should be a well-balanced adjustment among the crude, subtle, and causal utilizations.
5. Utilizations vary in accordance with time, space, and form; the utilizations should be progressive.

An initial glimpse of these five principles first appeared in Sarkar's earlier work, Idea and Ideology.

=== The market ===
As far as Prout's values and goals differ from those of capitalism and communism, so does its economic structure. Following a close analysis of the two systems, Prout's propounder argues that these philosophies are "anti-human" in the sense that they encourage people to relentlessly pursue material attainment, like name, fame, etc.

Another criticism of neo-liberalism and capitalism in general is the centralization of economic power in the hands of the rich leads to the exploitation of the masses and ultimately to the degeneration of society.

Prout claims that both capitalism and communism have been built on shaky foundations, and identifies weaknesses to a point where a new market system is required. He heavily critiqued communism, indicating that one of the reasons the USSRs experiment with communism did not work, causing the eventual implosion of their political structure, is that the Soviet central planning committees (Gosplan) had too much economic decision and cohesion power in the federation (see Marxism–Leninism).

Nonetheless, Sarkar observed aspects of market planning that help to create and sustain a healthy economy. In summary, Proutist thought considers that planning allows the market to protect its stakeholders from the meanderings of neo-liberal economics where profit-motive speaks highest. However, he stresses that a planning committee at a national level should only outline the broader aspects of economic development, leaving the details to be resolved by planning bodies at a local level where problems are best understood and more easily dealt with. (see diseconomies of scale). Consequently, this kind of top-down planning will leave communities, enterprises and ultimately workers with a significant level of freedom to decide their own economic future (see decentralized planning).

Prout also claims that the nationalization of enterprises is inefficient due to the larger costs and amount of bureaucracy necessary to keep state-controlled industries running. Yet, there are some industries that should be nationalized, operating on a "no-profit, no-loss" principle.

Concerning wealth distribution among the population, Sarkar argues for an "optimal inequality" where the wage gap between the richer strata of society is substantially subsided. Richard Freeman, a Harvard economist, points out income inequality comes from the monopoly of power and other activities with "negative consequences" in terms of social development. Nonetheless, Prout is not in favour of total income equality, claiming that in a society where material motivation to work is absent, the willingness to strive for financial success and to thrive in the creative development of industry and society will be lost in its citizens. Therefore, this theory argues for the implementation of a policy allowing the most meritorious in society to receive added perks for the added benefits they bring to society. It is thus theorized that the communist's motto of from each according to his ability, to each according to his needs cannot work in the real world. Prout proposes instead a minimum and maximum wage, roughly attributed according to the value the work of each person brings to society. We see examples of attempts in this direction in companies like Mondragon or Whole Foods.

Regarding neo-liberalism, Sarkar throws a new light to the concept of Adam Smith's invisible hand, where individual producers acting self-interest benefit the community as a whole. Prout claims that, unchecked, societies economic elite will disrupt the just circulation of material wealth within society. The market will then require regulatory measures so as to create a functional economic system.

=== Economic democracy ===
In relation to democracy, Prout argues that political democracy is not enough to free society from exploitation and what it considers extreme income inequality. As Roar Bjonnes, a known Proutist, states, "Unless we have deeper structural change – what we refer to as economic-systems change – we will never be able to solve such global and systemic problems as the environmental and inequality crises. History has demonstrated that political democracy is not enough."

Prout, therefore, advocates an economic democracy where the decision-making power for the economic future of a community is given to its inhabitants. Economic democracy is not a new term, but Sarkar reinvents it by setting four requirements for what he considers a successful one. The first and foremost requirement is guaranteeing the minimum requirements of life to all members of society. Secondly, and following one of the five fundamental principles, Prout argues that there should be an increasing purchasing capacity for each individual, stating that local people will have to hold economic power over their socio-economic region. Still, on this regard, Sarkar theorizes that, unlike capitalism, where the production and distribution of goods are mainly decided by market competition, in a Proutistic society it should be based on necessity. The third requirement of economic democracy is the decentralization of power, giving the freedom to make economic decisions to its stakeholders. That can be accomplished by adopting a worker-owned cooperative system and by the use of local resources (raw materials and other natural resources) for the development of the region and not merely for export. In summary, Prout advocates a decentralized economy where self-sufficient economic zones are created and organized according to a set of predetermined conditions (see socio-economic units).

Prout claims this requirement does not express xenophobic feelings, it solely claims to be the realization that there should not be a constant outflow of local capital, where natural resources are explored by foreign investment companies that extract assets and money out of the community. From a Neohumanist perspective, all people are free to choose where they wish to live, as long as they merge their economic interests with the ones of the local people.

=== Socio-economic units ===
A socio-economic unit, or samaja in Sanskrit, is the Proutist materialization of the collective effort to create a strong and resilient local community, built on strong feelings of solidarity and self-identity. There are a few criteria that Sarkar outlined in order to build a working and cohesive socio-economic unit. Similar to bioregions, their purpose is to facilitate cooperative development, moving towards a decentralized economy, where these units are economically independent and self-reliant. Though still guided by national and federal guidelines and laws, they should prepare its own economic plan.

Aiming to achieve maximum efficiency in the utilization of local resources, they propose to make trade across borders more balanced and mutually beneficial.

=== Progress ===
From Prout's perspective, a progressive society cannot solely be measured by the wealth of a nation or its GDP levels. Prout recognizes the benefits of material progress, but deems them insufficient indicators of the development of human society. It argues that even though progress as its interpreted by society today has its advantages, there are negative side effects that, if unchecked, bring more harm than good. Ronald Logan, author of A new Paradigm of Development, reminds its readers that even though auto and air traffic enables us to travel at increasing speeds, bringing great convenience to travelers and commuters, it also brings air pollution, noise pollution, traffic congestion, accidental deaths, alienation from nature, etc.

Presented with this quasi-paradoxical situation, Prout offers a concept of progress as a society that transcends material and technological development. Moving along the lines of the triple bottom line that analyzes the social, environmental and financial output of a given enterprise, Prout advocates a measure of progress that encompasses the qualities of what could be termed a "fourth bottom line", characterized by the incorporation of a transcendental dimension of human life that focuses on the integrated development of the body, mind and spirit. This fourth bottom line will allow society in general and individuals in particular to develop an expanded sense of identity, allowing for a neohumanist will of inclusion, creating a society where material gains are not the summum bonum of life and allowing space to be created for people to work together in a symbiotic movement that primes for individual and collective welfare through social, cultural, as well as technological development.

Prout acknowledges that the well-being of individuals lies in the development of the collective, and that the collective depends on the development of individuals. Therefore, in order to understand how a progressive society is to be achieved, Sarkar tries to analyze what it means for a human being to grow and develop. He concludes that physical and psychic development render little progress for a human being as they are subject to deterioration and decay. There are multifarious diseases that affect our body and mind, and even if we stay free of them, eventually time will turn all our physical and mental faculties of no use. Sarkar argues that the only aspect of human life that seems to be subject to no change over time is its transcendental nature, the "supra-emotional values" intrinsic to the human mind and which exacerbate human multilateral existence.

"The deepest truths of life are an eternal fountain of inspiration. Spiritual, transpersonal development is a process of expanding one's consciousness to link with the Infinite, to reach a state of deep peace and happiness."

From a Maslownian perspective, Prout defends the need to meet physical and mental needs before being able to engage in a journey to find that transcendental nature of the world. The five fundamental principles stem from this idea that society needs to provide for the basic necessities of all human beings so that they can engage in this journey of self-discovery and achieve true progress. Fundamentally, progress in society is the effort through which communities engage in the fulfillment of human needs, with the goal of achieving a transcendental existence. As a goal, transcendence will offer a fourth bottom line which ideally would propel human society into a more peaceful, inclusive and all-round more progressive existence.

== Reception ==
Prout is a relatively unknown theory.

Ravi Batra was one of the first economists that used the ideas of Prout in his bestseller The Great Depression of 1990. In time, the theory attracted attention of people like Johan Galtung, founder of the UN Institute for Peace studies who claimed that "Sarkar's theory is far superior to Adam Smith's or that of Marx."

According to a description by Terry Irving and Rowan Cahill, Prout "envisages a decentralised, community-based world economy of self-sufficiency for the poor; economic democracy; small business; and limits on the accumulation of wealth." Sohail Inayatullah stated that the philosophy "attempts to balance the need for societies to create wealth and grow with the requirements for distribution." David Skrbina characterized Prout as a "model of social development... which advocates a 'small is beautiful' approach to society." Economics instructor Mark Friedman places Sarkar's economic thought in the tradition of Monsignor John A. Ryan, E. F. Schumacher and Herman Daly in Sarkar's incorporation of spiritual values into economic goals.

It has been characterized as a form of "progressive socialism" as well as a "socialist theory".

Hans Despain noted, in Monthly Review, that there are similarities between Prout and the theories of David Schweickart, Gar Alperovitz and Richard D. Wolff. Particularly the focus on economic democracy and co-operatives.

== Political parties ==
Some political parties support the progressive utilization theory. They are:

- Amra Bangali
- Human World
- Progressive Party of Aotearoa New Zealand

== See also ==
- Political philosophy
- Indian philosophy
