= Prabhat Ranjan Sarkar =

Indian spiritual Guru, philosopher, social reformer, linguist, author and composer

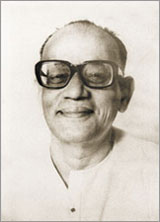
- Prabhat Ranjan Sarkar
- Born: 21 May 1921; Jamalpur, Bihar and Orissa Province, British India
- Died: 21 October 1990 (aged 69); Calcutta, West Bengal, India
- Education: Vidyasagar College; University of Calcutta
- Occupations: Spiritual Guru, philosopher, social reformer, linguist, author and composer
- Known for: Founder of Ananda Marga, Progressive Utilization Theory, Amra Bangali, Prabhat Samgiita, Ananda Marga Universal Relief Teams

Prabhat Ranjan Sarkar (21 May 1921 – 21 October 1990), also known by his spiritual name Shrii Shrii Ánandamúrti (Ánanda Múrti meaning "Bliss Embodiment"), and known as Bábá ("Father") to his disciples, was a spiritual guru, philosopher, social reformer, linguist, author and composer of 5,018 songs mostly in the Bengali language. He founded Ananda Marga (the Path of Bliss) in 1955 as a spiritual and social organisation that continues to offer instruction in meditation and yoga and runs numerous social service and disaster relief projects throughout the world.

Sarkar developed his system of spiritual practice as a synthesis of Vedic and Tantric philosophies. He denounced religious dogmas, casteism, materialism and capitalism, considering all of these as impediments to social harmony, progress and spiritual growth. He described the universe as a manifestation of consciousness coming under the bondage of its own nature, resulting in creation. His spiritual and social philosophies embraced diversity as the law of nature; a result of Singular Consciousness expressing itself in numerous forms. Sarkar advocated for the welfare of humans and the planet through his socio-economic philosophy of PROUT, which is rooted in the idea of Neohumanism, a worldview based on inter-connectedness of all beings.

== Biography ==
Sarkar was born during the full moon of the Indian month of Vaeshakh (Buddha Purnima), on 21 May 1921 (at 6:07 in the morning) to Lakshmi Narayan Sarkar, a homoeopathic doctor and Abharani Devi in the small town of Jamalpur, Bihar. His family hailed from Bamunpara (Brahmanpara), Burdwan District in West Bengal.

In 1939, Sarkar left Jamalpur for Kolkata to attend Vidyasagar College of the University of Calcutta. Sarkar had to quit his studies to support his family after the death of his father; from 1944 until the early 1950s, Sarkar worked as an accountant at the Indian railways headquarters in Jamalpur, Bihar. He taught the techniques of Yoga and Tantra meditation to a select number of his colleagues and gradually more people were drawn to the spiritual practices he taught.

In 1955, Sarkar founded Ananda Marga (the Path of Bliss), a socio-spiritual movement with a two-part mission that Sarkar stated as "self-realization and service to all" with a spiritual practice that synthesized Vedic and Tantric philosophies. Sarkar's ideas are collected in the series of books called "Subháśita Samgraha", which form part of the philosophical scriptures of Ananda Marga ideology.

During the latter part of his life, his main residence was in Lake Gardens in Kolkata, West Bengal. He also spent much time, especially early on, in the all-round development community he founded based on his PROUT theory at Anandanagar. Ananda Marga opened regional offices in various countries, including the US in 1969; by 1973, he had established approximately 100 local centres teaching yogic and social philosophies, with several thousand members, some living communally in the ashrams.

In 1971, Sarkar was imprisoned in India for the alleged murder of Ananda Marga members. On 1 April, after recovering his health, Sarkar began fasting in support of a demand for an inquest into his poisoning. That demand was never met. So he continued his fast for the next five years, four months, and two days, until 2 August 1978 when he was released from jail after having been acquitted of all charges.

In 1979, Sarkar took two world tours to meet disciples in various countries around the world, including Switzerland, Germany, France, Scandinavia, the Middle East, Philippines, Thailand, Taiwan, Jamaica and Venezuela. He was barred from entering the US by the State Department, so instead he met his American disciples in Jamaica in 1979. Just before he died on 21 October 1990 from a heart attack, he founded Ananda Marga Gurukula on 7 September 1990, an educational network to preserve and develop his legacy through research, teaching and service.

== Spiritual philosophy ==
"Critical of profit-motivated capitalism, hedonistic materialism, and religious dogma, Prabhat Ranjan Sarkar developed a Spiritual or Neo-Humanism bringing in spiritual, economic, social scientific, ecological, and moral themes to create a long term view of human progress; progress is the evolution of consciousness and movement directed toward the well-being of everyone. Basing his philosophy on love and respect for all things and the central human ideals of freedom, equality, and justice, Sarkar proposed that the physical, mental, and spiritual realms of humanity all need to be addressed in a vision of the future. A new social order – a "moral society" – is needed for the future, emphasizing cooperation over competition, collective welfare over profit, and transcendent ideals over self-interest. And finally, as a common theme that runs through many works, the idea of the New (or Second) Enlightenment, reflecting an ethical, psychological, and social transformation in humanity, has been proposed as a hopeful and preferable futurist vision for the world."

— Thomas Lombardo on Sarkar's philosophy.

Sarkar's teachings on spiritual philosophy are a synthesis of Vedic and Tantric philosophies. He considered himself to be "an incorrigible optimist" in his thinking.

=== Cosmology ===
Sarkar described the universe as a result of macropsychic conation – the entire universe exists within the cosmic mind, which itself is the first expression of consciousness coming under the bondage of its own nature. He described the cosmological flow as being from limitless consciousness to limited consciousness and back to limitless consciousness, attained by meditation.

=== Realms of the mind ===
According to Sarkar's philosophy the individual mind is composed of five layers called Kosas:

1. Kamamaya Kosa ("layer of desire") or "Crude Mind": is the layer that controls the body. It operates on instinct or passion. This layer is sometimes conscious and sometimes subconscious.
2. Manomaya Kosa ("layer of thinking") or "Subtle Mind": is the layer of thought and memory. This Kosa gives experience of pleasure and pain and is developed naturally through physical clash, and in Ananda Marga sadhana by pranayama with cosmic ideation.
3. Atimanasa Kosa or "Supramental Mind": is the intuitive layer. This Kosa gives the capacity of intuitive dreams, clairvoyance, telepathy and creative insight. It is developed naturally through psychic clash, and in Ananda Marga sadhana by methods of pratyahara (withdrawal) such as shuddhis and Guru Puja.
4. Vijinanamaya Kosa ("layer of the special knowledge") or "Subliminal Mind": is the layer of conscience or discrimination (viveka) and vaeragya (non-attachment). This Kosa is developed naturally through psychic clash, and its development is accelerated by the process of dharana.
5. Hiranyamaya Kosa ("golden level") or "Subtle Causal Mind": is the subtlest layer. Here the awareness of mind is very close to the direct experience of "Supreme Consciousness". Here there is only the separation of a thin veil of ignorance. This Kosa is developed naturally through the attraction for the Great, and dhyana accelerates this process for sadhakas (spiritual aspirants).

=== Biopsychology ===
Sarkar's "biopsychology" reimagined the traditional tantric belief in chakras ("wheels") as being due to interactions of subtle energies through nerve plexuses. He believed this connected the endocrine glands of the neuroendocrine system with a psychic part of the body. The philosophy of Ananda Marga considers the human body as composed of the same five fundamental factors as the rest of the universe as explained in Brahmachakra. Every factor is said to be distributed throughout the body, but governed by a chakra, substations of the mind which control their own assigned areas. The biopsychology of Ananda Marga expands the concept of the seven basic chakras and in general, mainly considers:

1. The Muladhara Chakra: at the tip of the spine (controls the solid factor).
2. The Svadhisthana Chakra: at the level of the genitals (controls the liquid factor and is associated with the reproductive glands).
3. The Manipura Chakra: at the level of the navel (controls the luminous factor and is associated with Pancreas).
4. The Anahata Chakra: at the center of the chest (controls the aerial factor and is associated with Thymus).
5. The Vishuddha Chakra: at the throat (controls the ethereal factor and is associated with the Thyroid gland).
6. The Ajina Chakra: between the eyebrows (associated with the Pituitary gland).
7. The Sahasrara Chakra: at the crown of the head (associated with the Pineal gland). Mind's propensities (vrttis) associated with each Chakra affect the glands and the hormones secreted from those glands (hence the emotions, physical behaviour and functioning of the various body systems). But the glands and the hormones they secrete may also affect the mind in a chain of feedback.

=== Microvita ===
"Microvita" is plural for "Microvitum" and literally means "possessing or with micro-life". He believed that microvita are smaller and subtler than physical atoms and subatomic particles, and in the psychic realm contribute to "pure consciousness". Sarkar claimed that they would be recognised by conventional science. Sarkar gave the intuitional theory of Microvita in 1986.

=== Sadhana ===
A central point in Sarkar's philosophy is the concept of Sadhana. He described Sadhana as a practice for "the transformation of fearful love into fearless love". For Sarkar, Sandhana was concretized by the practice of meditation. He recommended to his disciples the daily practice of individual meditation and the weekly practice of collective meditation. These weekly meetings of his disciples, called Dharma Chakras, are preceded by the collective singing of a few Prabhat Samgiita (or "Songs of the New Dawn", composed by P. R. Sarkar himself) followed by Baba Nam Kevalam kiirtan, then the mantra called Samgacchadvam. The mantra Nityam Shuddham marks the end of the collective meditation, then the spiritual gathering will end with the Guru Puja mantra.

== Social and political philosophy ==
=== Law of Social Cycle ===
The concept of Varna describes four main socio-psychological types, whereby human psychological and physical endowment and social motivations are expressed: the Vipra (intellectual), Kshatriya (warrior), Vaishya (acquisitor) and Shudra (labourer). Varna, in Sarkar's perspective, however is more than just a psychological trait but rather an archetype, approximately to Michel Foucault's notion of epistemes, which are broader frameworks of knowledge defining what is true and real. Sarkar clarified that Varna is not the same as Hindu idea of "caste". He was an ardent advocate of building a casteless society, in which everyone gets equal opportunities to fulfil their highest human potential based on their physical, psychological and spiritual strengths. To materialize this, Sarkar propounded Prout.

Sarkar's "Law of Social Cycle" applies these traits in a theory of historical evolution, where ages rise and fall in terms of ruling elites representing one of the above-mentioned traits. This "law" possibly connects to the earlier cyclical historical ideas of Sri Aurobindo, with a focus on the psychology of human development, as well as Ibn Khaldun, among other macrohistorians ideas about cycles. However, along with a cyclical dimension—the rise and fall of ages—Sarkar's theory exhibits a correspondent linear dimension, in that economic and technological "progress" are considered critical in terms of meeting the changing material conditions of life. Ultimately, for Sarkar, true progress has to prioritise development in the spiritual dimension. Sarkar criticised Marx's ideas on historical evolution, viewing it as having a narrow conceptual basis.

Spirituality for Sarkar is defined as the individual realising the "true self". In addition to yogic meditational practices and purity of thought and deed, Sarkar attached great importance to selfless social service as a means of liberation. Sarkar considered it necessary for the social arrangements to support the inner development of human beings and rejected both capitalism and communism as appropriate social structures for humanity to move forward to the golden age of a balanced way of life sustaining all-round progress. A serious problem with capitalism was according to Sarkar the concentration of wealth in a few hands and stoppages in the rolling of money which he considered root causes of recessions, even depressions. A spiritual way of life, however, would in no way be divorced from creating structures that help meet the basic, though ever changing, needs—food, housing, clothing, health and education.

Sarkar developed both Ánanda Márga and the Progressive Utilization Theory as practical means to encourage harmony and co-operation to help society escape this proposed cycle. Sarkar argues that once the social cycle is understood and sadvipras evolved, then the periods of exploitation can be largely reduced, if not eliminated. With leadership that is representative of all aspects of the varnas—that is, the leader engaged in service, who is courageous, who uses the intellect for the benefits of others, and who has innovative/entrepreneurial skills—the cycle can become an upward spiral. Sarkar's concept of karma samnyasa refers to the principle that a yogi becomes a person with all-round development and a balanced mind, that he called a sadvipra; and that this is accomplished by someone who remains fixed on the "supreme" consciousness through transformative personal practices and engaging in the politics of social liberation as a form of service work.

=== PROUT: Progressive Utilisation Theory ===
By 1959, Sarkar had developed the socio-economic Progressive Utilization Theory (Prout). In 1961, the theory was formally outlined in his book Ananda Sutram, published under his spiritual name Shrii Shrii Ánandamúrti. In 1968, Sarkar founded the organisation "Proutist Block of India" (PBI), to further the ideals of his theory through political and social action. The PBI was soon superseded by "Proutist Universal" (PU), which primarily consists of five federations (students, intellectuals, farmers, labour, and youth).

A Prout economy is cooperative and decentralised. Its focus is collective welfare rather than to profit, without neglecting individuals and their merits. "Progressive utilization" refers to the optimising the use of natural, industrial and human resources on a sustainable basis for the entire ecosystem. The theory claims to overcome the limitations of both capitalism and communism. It is inline with Sarkar's social theory of the Law of Social Cycle. The theory aims to encompass the whole of individual and collective existence for all beings, including physical, educational, social, political, mental, cultural and spiritual.

=== Neohumanism ===
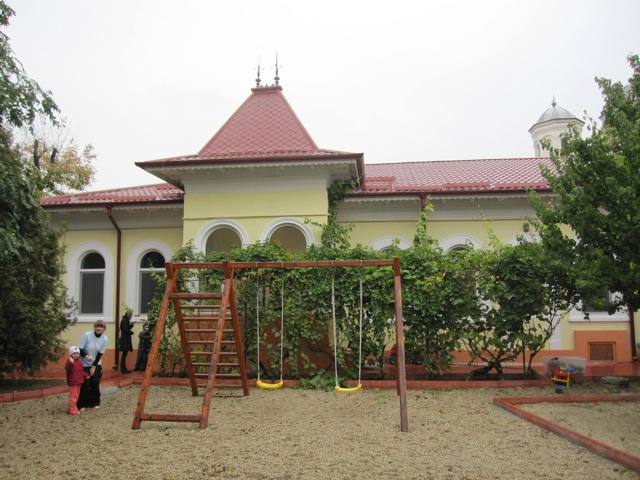
Ananda Marga in Bucharest, Romania

In 1982, Sarkar extended his writings on the subject of human society with the introduction of his new theory of Neohumanism. If humanism tends to contemplate only humans in a human-centric view, Neohumanism, according to Sarkar's theory, is instead the elevation of humanism to universalism. Sarkar said "When the underlying spirit of humanism is extended to everything, animate and inanimate, in this universe – I have designated this as "Neohumanism". This Neohumanism will elevate humanism to universalism, the cult of love for all created beings of this universe." Neohumanism is said to prefer existential value over utility value for all living beings.

Sarkar's Neohumanism places great emphasis on rationality and encourages what he calls a "protospiritual mentality," a process of continually recognising each object with which we come in contact, externally or internally, as a manifestation of the Supreme Consciousness (Brahma). According to Sarkar, rationality helps to give rise to devotion, which he consider to be the "highest and most valuable treasure of humanity". In Sarkar's view, Neohumanism leads to the liberation of human intellect from the constraints of imposed dogma and the principle of selfish pleasure and psychic complexes helping to bridge the gap between the inner and outer worlds.

=== Culture ===
In his series of discourses Talks on Prout, given in Ranchi in July 1961, Sarkar makes a distinction between the terms "culture" and "customs". According to Sarkar "culture... is the collective name for different expressions of life..." but "...all of society has the same culture. There are local variations in the mode or state of cultural expression, but the expression is universal... These local variations are called customs... Thus local modes of expression bearing local or group specialities are customs, but the expression itself is culture. Therefore it is a mistake to readjust boundaries on the basis of language and culture. Indian culture and the culture of the world are one and the same."

The philosophy of Sarkar reinterprets the general concept of culture by inserting it into a new universalistic outlook. As described by Antonello Maggipinto:

If the term "culture" is usually referred to the original meaning of this word (i.e. from the Greek "paidéia" to the Latin "humanitas", that is to human beings capable of distinguishably mastering the arts, rhetoric, and philosophy), then Sarkar offers a new point of view, with a large universalistic explanation: "the culture of the whole human race is one, but marked by different local manifestations [...] it is the same, but varying in expression." (Sarkar, P.R., 1987)

== Works ==
Although Sarkar spent only seventeen years of his life working full-time for his organisations (1966–1971 and 1978–1990), he left behind a vast legacy, including over 250 books written on a wide variety of topics. Many of this books are compilations or collections of speeches given by him during spiritual or social meetings. He is primarily known as the spiritual teacher behind Ananda Marga, but Sarkar wrote over 1500 pages on his socio-politico-economic Progressive Utilization Theory (PROUT), with several thousand more pages dedicated to linguistics and the study of languages; Sarkar's writings on linguistics included, among other works, Shabda Cayanika ("A Collection of Words"), an unfinished, twenty-six volume dictated encyclopaedia on the Bengali language. Beyond this, he wrote books on sociology, agriculture, history, literature, education, medicine, cosmology, and philosophy, also notably founding the philosophy of Neohumanism in 1982 and the Theory of Microvita in 1986. In his Theory of Microvita, Sarkar "believed that the atoms and the subatomic particles throughout the boundless universe are imbued with life."

=== Music ===
In 1982 Sarkar started composing songs. In eight years, until the date of his death, He completed the composition of 5018 songs in multiple languages. His collection of songs is called Prabhat Samgiita ("Songs of the New Dawn").

== See also ==
- List of founders of religious traditions
- List of Hindu gurus and sants
- List of philosophers
- Music of Bengal
- List of political parties in India
- List of Bengalis
- List of Indian writers
- Hindu reform movements
- Kaosikii dance
