= Consumer behaviour =

Study of consumption of goods and services

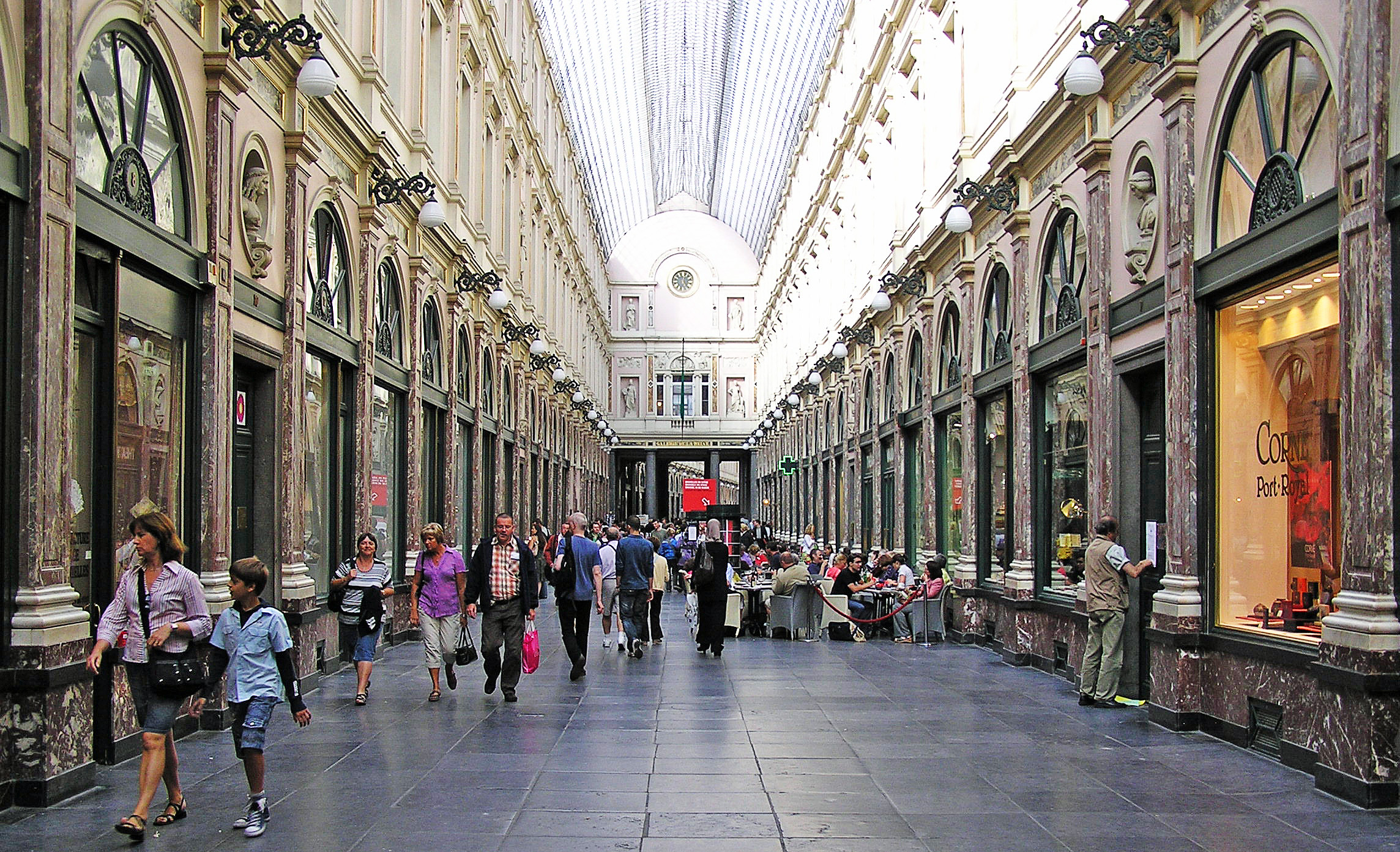
The Royal Saint-Hubert Galleries shopping arcade in Brussels, Belgium. Consumer behaviour, in its broadest sense, is concerned with how consumers select, decide and use goods and services.

Consumer behaviour is the study of individuals, groups, or organisations and all activities associated with the purchase, use and disposal of goods and services. It encompasses how the consumer's emotions, attitudes, and preferences affect buying behaviour, and how external cues—such as visual prompts, auditory signals, or tactile (haptic) feedback—can shape those responses. Consumer behaviour emerged in the 1940–1950s as a distinct sub-discipline of marketing, but has become an interdisciplinary social science that blends elements from psychology, sociology, social anthropology, anthropology, ethnography, ethnology, marketing, and economics (especially behavioural economics).

The study of consumer behaviour formally investigates individual qualities such as demographics, personality lifestyles, and behavioural variables (like usage rates, usage occasion, loyalty, brand advocacy, and willingness to provide referrals), in an attempt to understand people's wants and consumption patterns. Consumer behaviour also investigates on the influences on the consumer, from social groups such as family, friends, sports, and reference groups, to society in general (brand-influencers, opinion leaders).

Due to the unpredictability of consumer behavior, marketers and researchers use ethnography, consumer neuroscience, and machine learning, along with customer relationship management (CRM) databases, to analyze customer patterns. The extensive data from these databases allows for a detailed examination of factors influencing customer loyalty, re-purchase intentions, and other behaviors like providing referrals and becoming brand advocates. Additionally, these databases aid in market segmentation, particularly behavioral segmentation, enabling the creation of highly targeted and personalized marketing strategies.

== Origins of consumer behaviour ==
In the 1940s and 1950s, marketing was dominated by the so-called classical schools of thought which were highly descriptive and relied heavily on case study approaches with only occasional use of interview methods. At the end of the 1950s, two important reports criticised marketing for its lack of methodological rigor, especially the failure to adopt mathematically-oriented behavioural science research methods. The stage was set for marketing to become more inter-disciplinary by adopting a consumer-behaviourist perspective.

From the 1950s, marketing began to shift its reliance away from economics and towards other disciplines, notably the behavioural sciences, including sociology, anthropology, and clinical psychology. This resulted in a new emphasis on the customer as a unit of analysis. As a result, new substantive knowledge was added to the marketing discipline – including such ideas as opinion leadership, reference groups, and brand loyalty. Market segmentation, especially demographic segmentation based on socioeconomic status (SES) index and household life-cycle, also became fashionable. With the addition of consumer behaviour, the marketing discipline exhibited increasing scientific sophistication with respect to theory development and testing procedures.

In its early years, consumer behaviour was heavily influenced by motivation research, which had increased the understanding of customers, and had been used extensively by consultants in the advertising industry and also within the discipline of psychology in the 1920s, 1930s, and 1940s. By the 1950s, marketing began to adopt techniques used by motivation researchers including depth interviews, projective techniques, thematic apperception tests, and a range of qualitative and quantitative research methods. More recently, scholars have added a new set of tools including ethnography, photo-elicitation techniques, and phenomenological interviewing. In addition to these, contemporary research has delved further into the complexities of consumer behavior, incorporating innovative approaches such as neuroimaging studies and big data analytics. These modern tools provide deeper insights into subconscious consumer motivations and decision-making processes. Today, consumer behaviour (or CB as it is affectionately known) is regarded as an important sub-discipline within marketing and is included as a unit of study in almost all undergraduate marketing programs.

== Definition and explanation ==
Consumer behaviour entails "all activities associated with the purchase, use and disposal of goods and services, including the consumer's emotional, mental and behavioural responses that precede or follow these activities." The term consumer can refer to individual consumers as well as organisational consumers, and more specifically, "an end user, and not necessarily a purchaser, in the distribution chain of a good or service." Consumer behaviour is concerned with:

- purchase activities: the purchase of goods or services; how consumers acquire products and services, and all the activities leading up to a purchase decision, including information search, evaluating goods and services, and payment methods including the purchase experience
- use or consumption activities: concerns the who, where, when, and how of consumption and the usage experience, including the symbolic associations and the way that goods are distributed within families or consumption units
- disposal activities: concerns the way that consumers dispose of products and packaging; may also include reselling activities such as eBay and second-hand markets

Consumer responses may be:

- emotional (or affective) responses: refer to emotions such as feelings or moods,
- mental (or cognitive) responses: refer to the consumer's thought processes, their
- behavioural (or conative) responses: refer to the consumer's observable responses in relation to the purchase and disposal of goods or services.

According to the American Marketing Association, consumer behaviour can be defined as "the dynamic interaction of affect and cognition, behaviour, and environmental events by which human beings conduct the exchange aspects of their lives."

As a field of study, consumer behaviour is an applied social science. Consumer behaviour analysis is the "use of behaviour principles, usually gained experimentally, to interpret human economic consumption." As a discipline, consumer behaviour stands at the intersection of economic psychology and marketing science.

== The purchase decision and its context ==
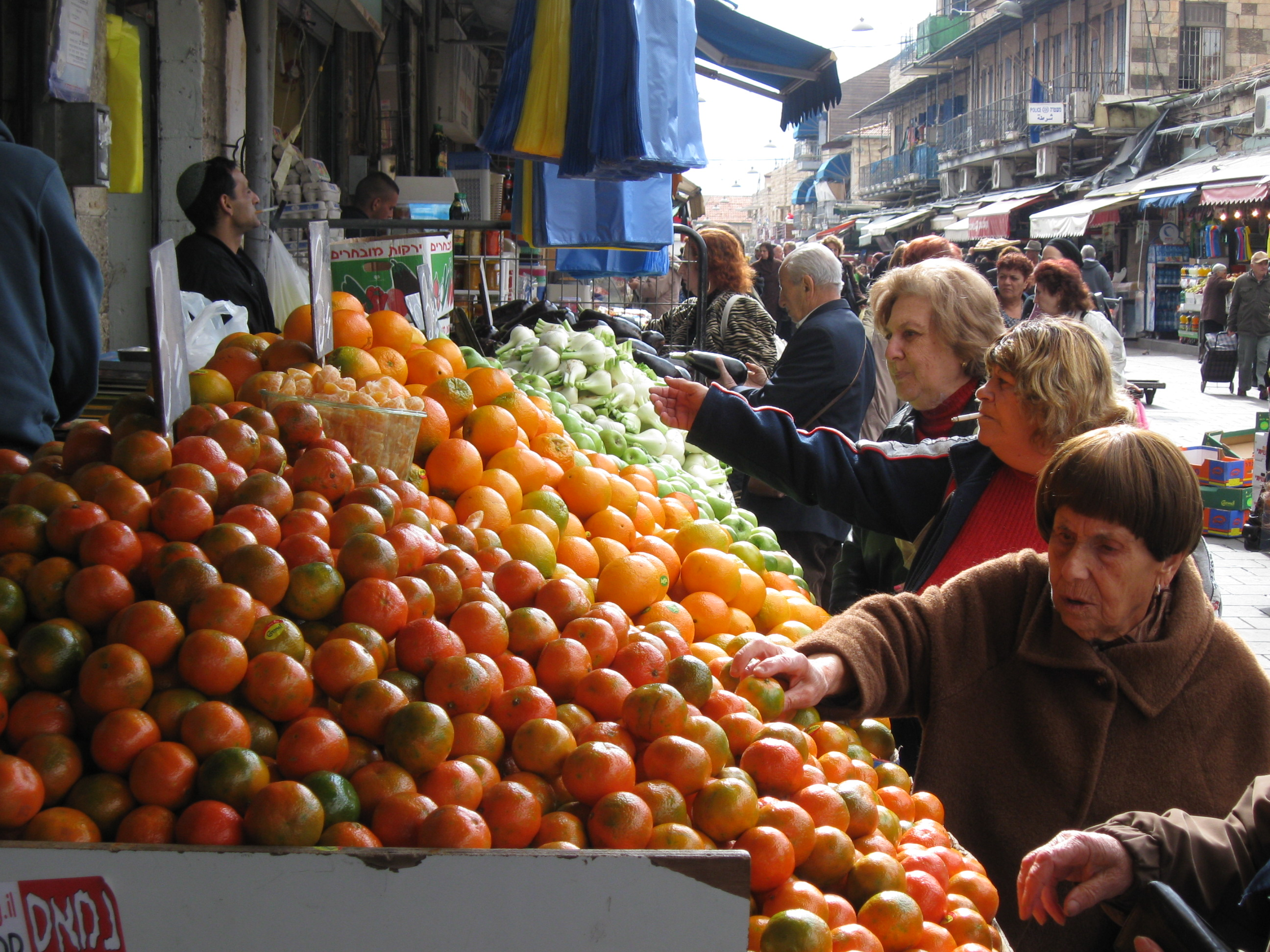
Shoppers inspect the quality of fresh produce at a market in Jerusalem.

Understanding purchase and consumption behaviour is a key challenge for marketers. Consumer behaviour, in its broadest sense, is concerned with understanding both how purchase decisions are made and how products or services are consumed or experienced. Consumers are active decision-makers. They decide what to purchase, often based on their disposable income or budget. They may change their preferences related to their budget and a range of other factors.

Some purchase decisions involve long, detailed processes that include extensive information search to select between competing alternatives. Other purchase decisions, consumers must make highly complex decisions, often based on a lack of time, knowledge or negotiating ability. Such as impulse buys or habitual purchases, are made almost instantaneously with little or no investment of time or effort in information search.

Some purchase decisions are made by groups (such as families, households, or businesses), while others are made by individuals. When a purchase decision is made by a small group, such as a household, different members of the group may become involved at different stages of the decision-making process and may perform different roles. For example, one person may suggest the purchase category, another may search for product-related information, while yet another may physically go to the store, buy the product, and transport it home. It is customary to think about the different types of decision-making roles, such as:

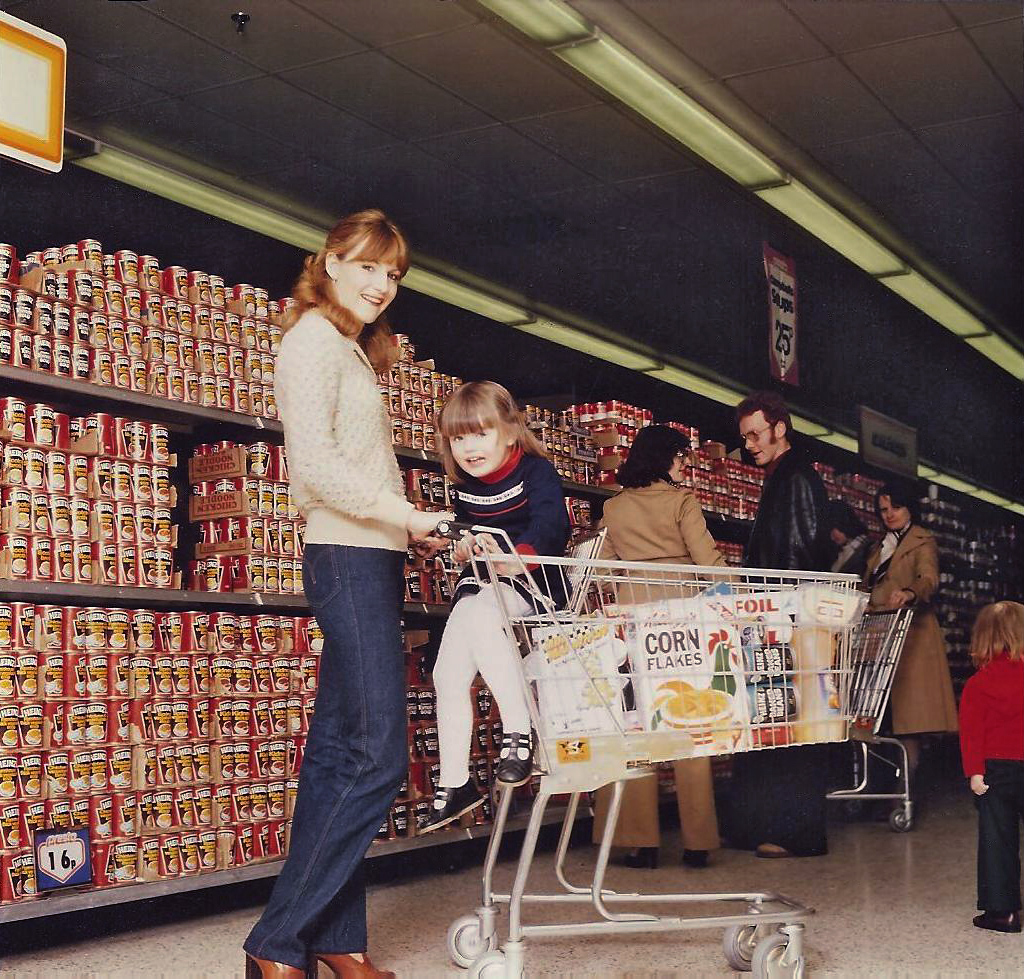
In a family unit, an adult female often makes brand choices on behalf of the entire household, while children can be important influencers.

The Initiator
the person who proposes a brand (or product) for consideration (something in return);
The Influencer
someone who recommends a given brand;
The Decider
the person who makes the ultimate purchase decision;
The Purchaser
the one who orders or physically buys it;
The User
the person who uses or consumes the product.

For most purchase decisions, each of the decision roles must be performed, but not always by the same individual. For example, in the case of family making a decision about a dining-out venue, a parent may initiate the process by intimating that they are too tired to cook. The children are important influencers in the overall purchase decision, but both parents may act as joint deciders performing a gate-keeping role by vetoing unacceptable alternatives and encouraging more acceptable alternatives. The importance of children as influencers in a wide range of purchase contexts should never be underestimated and the phenomenon is known as pester power.

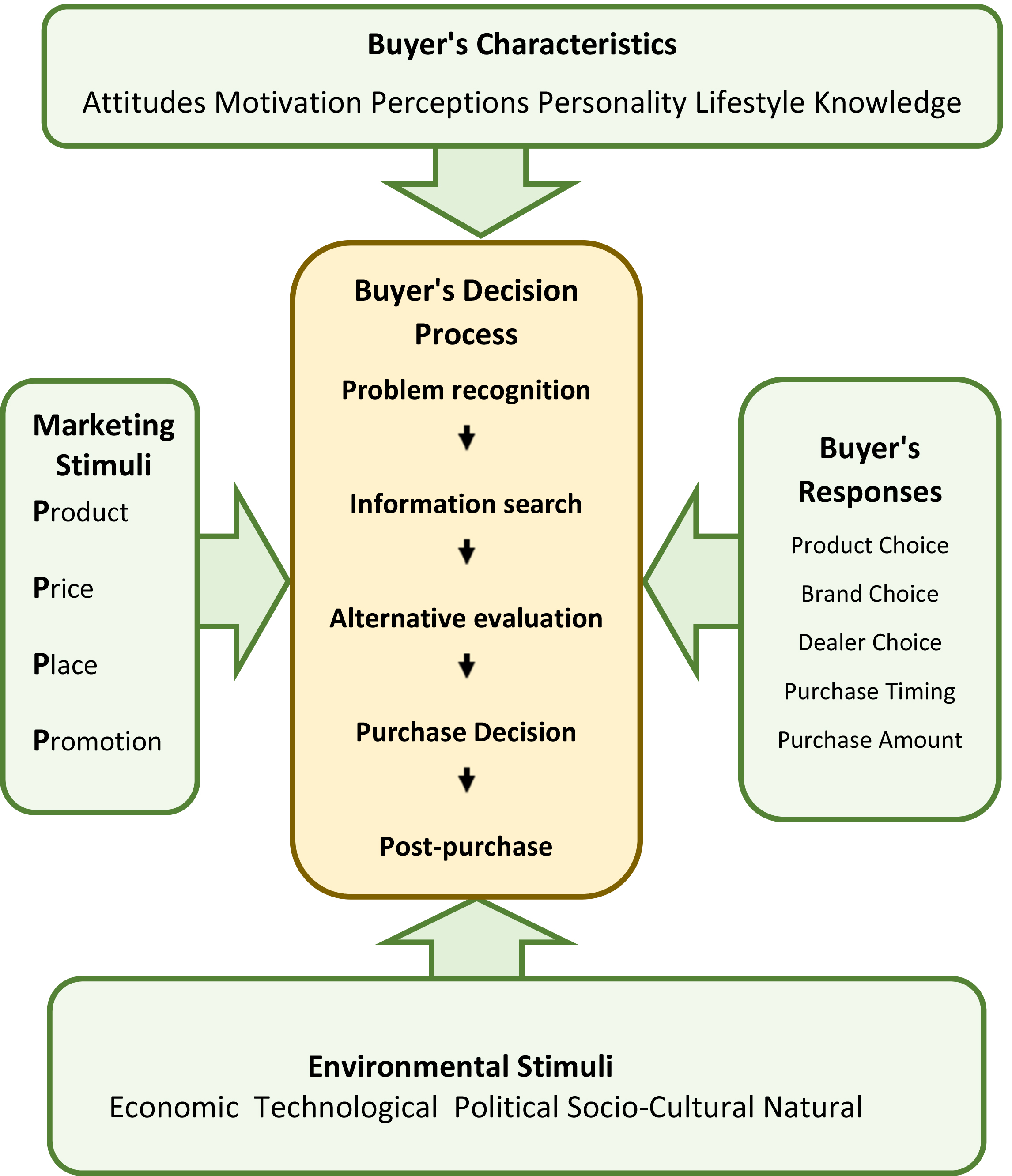
The purchasing decision model

To approach the mental processes used in purchasing decisions, some authors employ the concept of the black box, which represents the cognitive and affective processes used by a consumer during a purchase decision. The decision model situates the black box in a broader environment which shows the interaction of external and internal stimuli (e.g. consumer characteristics, situational factors, marketing influences, and environmental factors) as well as consumer responses. The black box model is related to the black box theory of behaviourism, where the focus extends beyond processes occurring inside the consumer and also includes the relation between the stimuli and the consumer's response.

The decision model assumes that purchase decisions do not occur in a vacuum. Rather, they occur in real time and are affected by other stimuli, including external environmental stimuli and the consumer's momentary situation. The elements of the model include interpersonal stimuli (between people) or intrapersonal stimuli (within people), environmental stimuli and marketing stimuli. Marketing stimuli include actions planned and carried out by companies, whereas environmental stimuli include actions or events occurring in the wider operating environment and include social, economic, political, and cultural dimensions. In addition, the buyer's black box includes buyer characteristics and the decision process, which influence the buyer's responses.

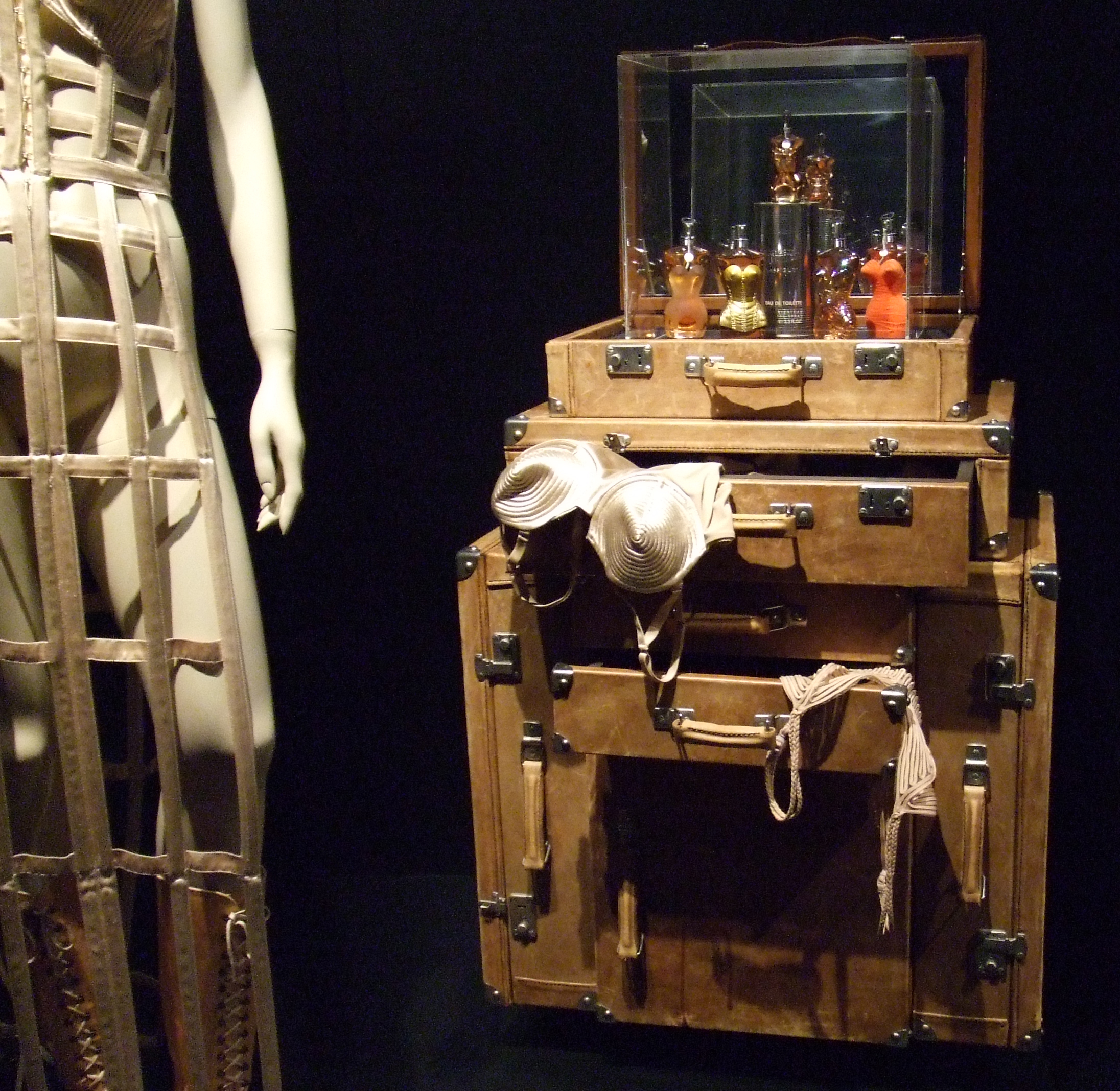
Purchases of up-market perfumes, often bought as gifts, are high involvement decisions because the gift symbolises the relationship between the giver and the intended recipient.

=== Problem recognition ===
The first stage of the purchase decision process begins with problem recognition (also known as category need or need arousal). This is when the consumer identifies a need, typically defined as the difference between the consumer's current state and their desired or ideal state. A simpler way of thinking about problem recognition is that it is where the consumer decides that they are 'in the market' for a product or service to satisfy some need or want. The strength of the underlying need drives the entire decision process.

Theorists identify three broad classes of problem-solving situation relevant for the purchase decision:

Extensive problem-solving
Purchases that warrant greater deliberation, more extensive information search and evaluation of alternatives. These are typically expensive purchases, or purchases with high social visibility e.g. fashion, cars.
Limited problem-solving
Known or familiar purchases, regular purchases, straight re-buys. Typically low-priced items.
Routinised problem-solving
Repeat purchases or habitual purchases

Consumers become aware of a problem in a variety of ways including:

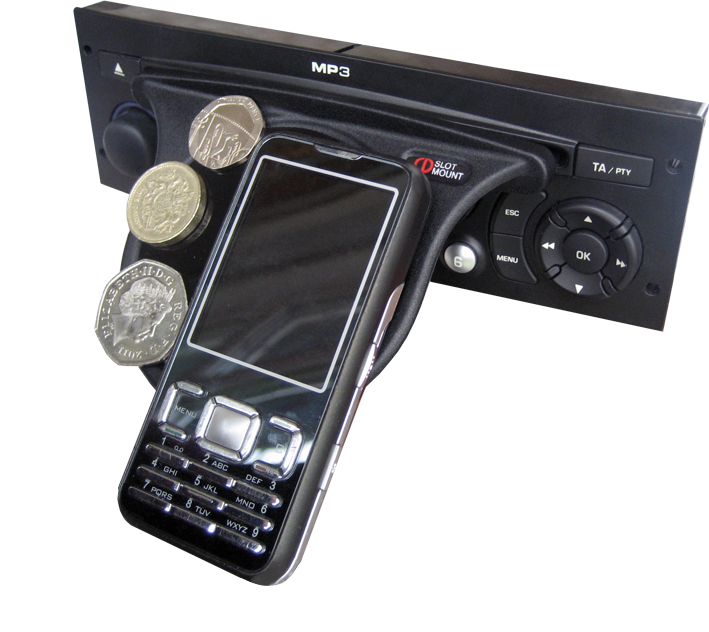
The purchase of a mobile phone may trigger the desire for accessories such as this phone mount for use in a car.

Out-of-Stock/ Natural Depletion
When a consumer needs to replenish stocks of a consumable item e.g. ran out of milk or bread.
Regular purchase
When a consumer purchases a product on a regular basis e.g. newspaper, magazines.
Dissatisfaction
When a consumer is not satisfied with the current product or service.
New Needs or Wants
Lifestyle changes may trigger the identification of new needs e.g. the arrival of a baby may prompt the purchase of a cot, stroller, and car-seat for the baby.
Related products
The purchase of one product may trigger the need for accessories, spare parts, or complementary goods and services e.g. the purchase of a printer leads to the need for ink cartridges; the purchase of a digital camera leads to the need for memory cards.
Marketer-induced problem recognition
When marketing activity persuades consumers of a problem (usually a problem that the consumer did not realise they had). The consciously, and subconsciously, consumed content in traditional as well as social media greatly plays the role of a stimulus for the consumer's recognition of a new need.
New Products or Categories
When consumers become aware of new innovative products that offer a superior means of fulfilling a need. Disruptive technologies such as the advent of wireless-free communications devices can trigger a need for plethora of products such as a new mouse or printer.

=== Information search ===
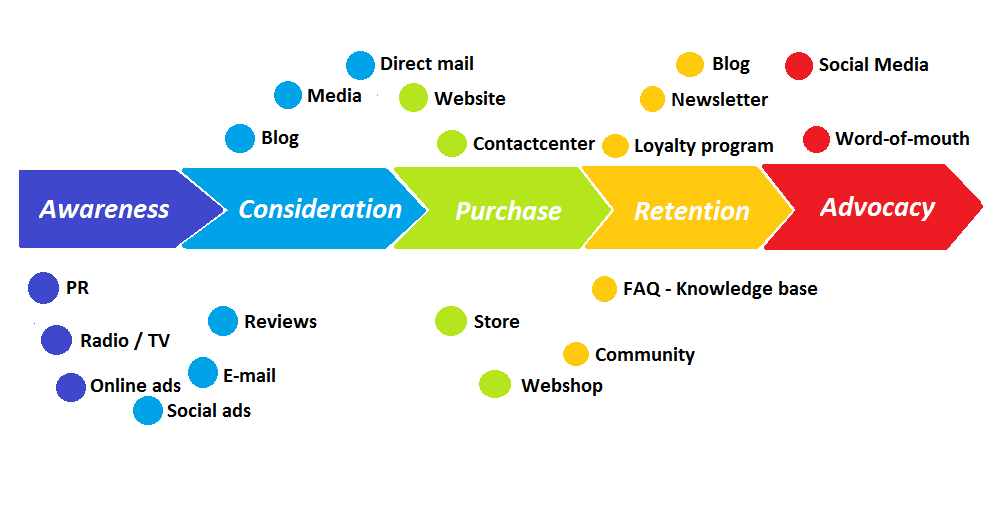
Customer purchase decision, illustrating different communications touchpoints at each stage

During the information search and evaluation stages, the consumer works through processes designed to arrive at a number of brands (or products) that represent viable purchase alternatives. Typically consumers first carry out an internal search and scan their memory for suitable brands. The evoked set is the set of brands that a consumer can elicit from memory and is typically a very small set of some 3- 5 alternatives. Consumers may choose to supplement the number of brands in the evoked set by carrying out an external search using sources such as the Internet, manufacturer/brand websites, shopping around, product reviews, referrals from peers and the like. The readiness of information availability has raised the informedness of the consumers: the degree to which they know what is available in the marketplace, with precisely which attributes, and at precisely what price.

The fact that a consumer is aware of a brand does not necessarily mean that it is being considered as a potential purchase. For instance, the consumer may be aware of certain brands, but not favourably disposed towards them (known as the inept set). Such brands will typically be excluded from further evaluation as purchase options. For other brands, the consumer may have indifferent feelings (the inert set). As the consumer approaches the actual purchase, they distill the mental list of brands into a set of alternatives that represent realistic purchase options, known as the consideration set. By definition, the consideration set refers to the "small set of brands which a consumer pays close attention to when making a purchase decision". This ultimately leads to a choice set which includes the alternatives that are strong contenders for purchase.

Specific brand names enter the consumer's consideration set based on the extent to which they satisfy the consumer's purchasing objectives and/or the salience or accessibility of the brand at the time of making the purchase decision. By implication, brand names that are more memorable are more likely to be accessible. Traditionally, one of the main roles of advertising and promotion was to increase the likelihood that a brand name was included in the consumer's evoked set. Repeated exposure to brand names through intensive advertising was the primary method for increasing top-of-mind brand awareness. However, the advent of the Internet means that consumers can obtain brand/product information from a multiplicity of different platforms. In practice, the consideration set has assumed greater importance in the purchase decision process because consumers are no longer totally reliant on memory. This is marketing, which could be defined as "the process by which companies create value for customers and build strong customer relationships, in order to capture value from customers in return." This definition strongly implies that the relationship is built upon an exchange and the "creation" of value. This means that a need is built for a consumer, with the product presented or advertised to them through an analytical study of the user's patterns of consumption and their behaviours and habits. The implication for marketers is that relevant brand information should be disseminated as widely as possible and included on any forum where consumers are likely to search for product or brand information, whether traditional media or digital media channels. Thus, marketers require a rich understanding of the typical consumer's touchpoints.

=== Evaluation of alternatives ===
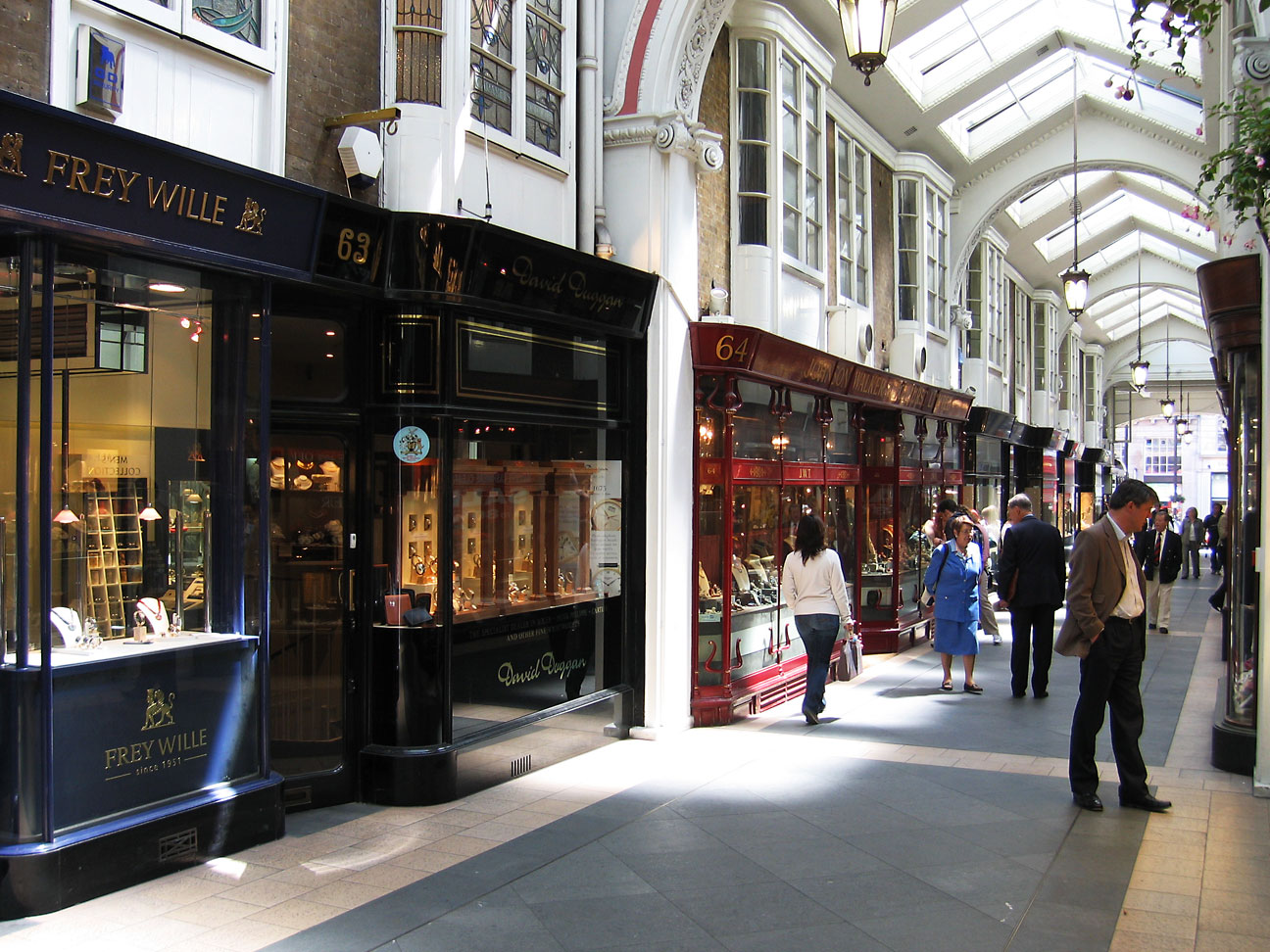
Consumers shopping at London's Burlington Arcade engage in a variety of recreational and functional purchasing activities - from window shopping through to transporting their purchases homewards.

Consumer evaluation can be viewed as a distinct stage. Alternatively, evaluation may occur continuously throughout the entire decision process. Consumers evaluate alternatives in terms of the functional (also called utilitarian) and psycho-social (also called the value-expressive or the symbolic) benefits offered.

- Functional benefits are the tangible outcomes that can be experienced by the consumer such as taste or physical appearance.
- Psycho-social benefits are the more abstract outcomes or the personality-related attributes of a brand, such as the social currency that might accrue from wearing an expensive suit or designer label or driving a 'hot' car.

Brand image (or brand personality) is an important psycho-social attribute. Consumers can have both positive and negative beliefs about a given brand. A considerable body of research suggests that consumers are predisposed towards brands with a personality that matches their own and that a good match can affect brand preference, brand choice, satisfaction with a brand, brand commitment and loyalty, and the consumer's propensity to give positive word-of-mouth referrals. The branch of consumer behaviour that investigates the matching of a brand's personality and the consumer's personality is known as self-congruity research. The social media presence of a brand plays a huge part in this stage, with the effect described as "Think of regular media as a one-way street where you can read a newspaper or listen to a report on television, but you have very limited ability to give your thoughts on the matter. Social media, on the other hand, is a two-way street that gives you the ability to communicate too." Consumer beliefs about a brand or product category may vary depending on a range of factors including the consumer's prior experience and the effects of selective perception, distortion, and retention. Consumers who are less knowledgeable about a category tend to evaluate a brand based on its functional characteristics. However, when consumers become more knowledgeable, functional attributes diminish and consumers process more abstract information about the brand, notably the self-related aspects.

The marketing organisation needs a deep understanding of the benefits most valued by consumers and therefore which attributes are most important in terms of the consumer's purchase decision. It also needs to monitor other brands in the customer's consideration set to optimise planning for its own brand. During the evaluation of alternatives, the consumer ranks or assesses the relative merits of different options available. No universal evaluation process is used by consumers across all-buying situations. Instead, consumers generate different evaluation criteria depending on each unique buying situation. Social media further enables consumers to share views with their peers about the product they are looking to purchase. This way, consumers can gauge the positive and negative sides of each alternative, and decide even more conveniently as for the best product to buy. Thus the relevant evaluation attributes vary according to across different types of consumers and purchase contexts. For example, attributes important for evaluating a restaurant would include food quality, price, location, atmosphere, quality of service, and menu selection. Consumers, depending on their geographic, demographic, psychographic and behavioural characteristics, will decide which attributes are important to them. Potential patrons seeking a pleasant dining experience may be willing to travel further distances to patronise a fine-dining venue compared to those wanting a quick meal at a more utilitarian eatery. After evaluating the different product attributes, the consumer ranks each attribute or benefit from highly important to least important. These priorities are directly related to the consumer's needs and wants. Thus, the consumer arrives at a weighted score for each product or brand which represents the consumer's subjective assessment of individual attribute scores weighted in terms of their importance. Using these scores, they arrive at a total mental score or rank for each product/brand under consideration.

=== Purchase decision ===
Once the alternatives have been evaluated, the consumer firms up their resolve to proceed through to the actual purchase. For example, the consumer might say to themself, "Yes, I will buy Brand X one day." This self instruction to make a purchase is known as purchase intent. Purchase intentions are a strong yet imperfect predictor of sales. Sometimes purchase intentions simply do not translate into an actual purchase and this can signal a marketing problem. For instance, a consumer may wish to buy a new product, but may be unaware of the retail outlets that stock it, so that purchase cannot proceed. The extent to which purchase intentions result in actual sales is known as the sales conversion rate.

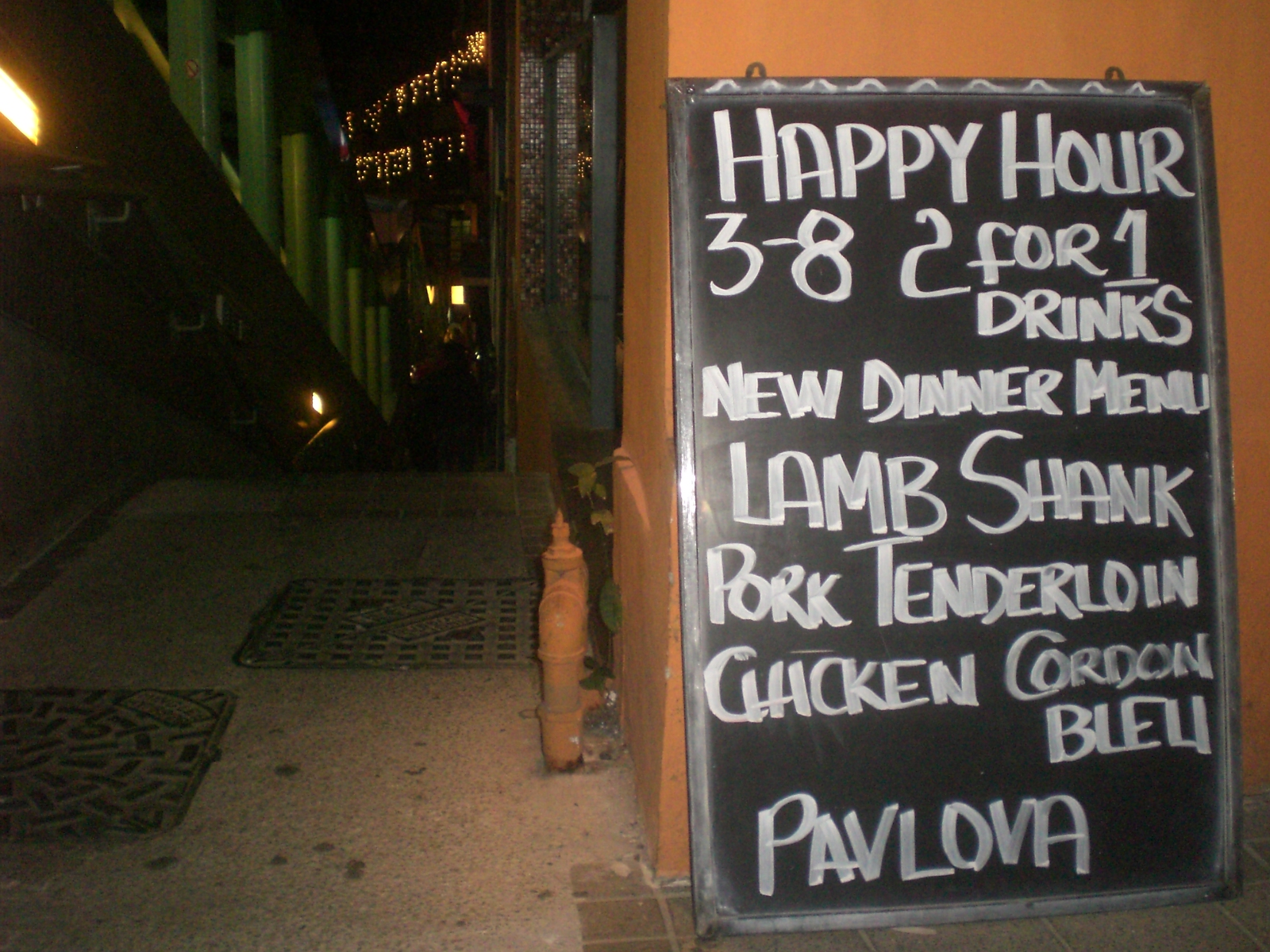
Happy hour, where two drinks can be purchased for the price of one, is a strong call-to-action because it encourages consumers to buy now rather than defer purchasing to a later time.

Organisations use a variety of techniques to improve conversion rates. The provision of easy credit or payment terms may encourage purchase. Sales promotions such as the opportunity to receive a premium or enter a competition may provide an incentive to buy now rather than defer purchases for a later date. Advertising messages with a strong call-to-action are yet another device used to convert customers. A call-to-action is any device designed to encourage immediate sale. Typically, a call-to-action includes specific wording in an advertisement or selling pitch that employs imperative verbs such as "Buy now!" or "Don't wait!". Other types of calls-to-action might provide consumers with strong reasons for purchasing immediately such an offer that is only available for a limited time (e.g. 'Offer must expire soon'; 'Limited stocks available') or a special deal usually accompanied by a time constraint (e.g. 'Order before midnight to receive a free gift with your order'; 'Two for the price of one for the first 50 callers only'). Additionally, service convenience is a saving of effort, in the way that it minimises the activities that customers may bear to buy goods and services. The key to a powerful call-to-action is to provide consumers with compelling reasons to purchase promptly rather than defer purchase decisions.

As consumers approach the actual purchase decision, they are more likely to rely on personal sources of information. For this reason, personal sales representatives must be well versed in giving sales pitches and in tactics used to close the sale. Methods used might include 'social evidence', where the salesperson refers to previous success and satisfaction from other customers buying the product. 'Scarcity attraction' is another technique, where the salesperson mentions that the offer is limited, as it forces the consumer to make a quicker decision and therefore spend less time evaluating alternatives.

=== Post-purchase evaluation ===
Following purchase and after experiencing the product or service, the consumer enters the final stage, namely post-purchase evaluation. Foxall suggested that post-purchase evaluation can provide key feedback to marketers because it influences future purchase patterns and consumption activities.

The post purchase stage is where the consumer examines and compares product features, such as price, functionality, and quality with their expectations. Post purchase evaluation can be viewed as the steps taken by consumers to correlate their expectations with perceived value and thus influence their next purchase decision for that good or service. For example, if a consumer buys a new phone and their post-purchase evaluation is positive, they will be encouraged to purchase the same brand or from the same company in the future. This is also known as "post-purchase intention". On the contrary, if a consumer is dissatisfied with the new phone, they may take actions to resolve the dissatisfaction. Consumer actions, in this instance, could involve requesting a refund, making a complaint, deciding not to purchase the same brand or from the same company in the future, or even spreading negative product reviews to friends or acquaintances, possibly via social media.

After acquisition, consumption, or disposition, consumers may feel some uncertainty in regards to the decision made, generating in some cases regret. Post-decision dissonance (also known as cognitive dissonance) is the feeling of anxiety that occurs in the post purchase stage, as well as the uneasy feelings or concerns as to whether or not the correct decision was made at purchase. Some consumers, for instance, may regret that they did not purchase one of the other brands they were considering. This type of anxiety can affect consumers' subsequent behaviour and may have implications for repeat patronage and customer loyalty.

Consumers use a number of strategies to reduce post purchase dissonance. A typical strategy is to look to peers or significant others for validation of the purchase choice. Customers have always been led by the opinions of friends and family, but nowadays this is corroborated by social media likes, reviews, and testimonials. Marketing communications can also be used to remind consumers that they made a wise choice by purchasing Brand X.

When consumers make unfavorable comparisons between the chosen option and the options forgone, they may feel post-decision regret or buyer's remorse. Consumers can also feel short-term regret when they avoid making a purchase decision, however this regret can dissipate over time. Through their experiences consumers can learn and also engage in a process called hypothesis testing. This refers to the formation of hypotheses about the products or a service through prior experience or word of mouth communications. There are four stages that consumers go through in the hypothesis testing: Hypothesis generation, exposure of evidence, encoding of evidence, and integration of evidence.

== Influences on purchase decision ==
Purchasing is influenced by a wide range of internal and external factors.

=== Consumer awareness ===
Consumer awareness refers to the awareness of the consumption of goods bought by consumers in the long-term shopping environment and purchasing activities.

The change of life concept is the subjective factor of the change of consumer awareness. As people's living standards and incomes continue to increase, people's life concepts are constantly changing. Differences in consumer personality are the internal motivations for changes in consumer awareness.

Intensified market competition is a catalyst for changes in consumer awareness. Many companies have launched their own branded products in order to gain a foothold in an increasingly competitive market. In the face of a variety of goods and brands, consumers' brand awareness matures. When people buy goods, paying attention to the brand has become a fashion. Faced with the severe competition situation, companies began to realize the importance of implementing brand strategy, and began to focus on market research, and on this basis, deeply grasp the consumer's psychological pulse to improve market share and brand loyalty. With the change of people's life concept, consumers' rational consumption psychology has become increasingly prominent. Social Marketing, Customised Marketing, brand-name shopping, and the consumer's perception of the price of the commodity (directly expressed as the consumer's sensitivity to price) are all main factors for understanding consumer attitudes, and help explain the reaction of market demand to price changes.

=== Internal influences on purchase decision ===
Internal influences refer to both personal and interpersonal factors. Social theory suggests that individuals have both a personal identity and a social identity. Personal identity consists of unique personal characteristics such as skills and capabilities, interests, and hobbies. Social identity consists of the individual's perception of the central groups to which an individual belongs and may refer to an age group, a lifestyle group, religious group, educational group, or some other reference group. Social psychologists have established that the need to belong is one of the fundamental human needs. Purchasing behaviour is therefore influenced by a broad range of internal factors such as psychological, socio-economic, demographic and personality factors. Demographic factors include income level, psychographics (lifestyles), age, occupation, and socioeconomic status. Personality factors include knowledge, attitudes, personal values, beliefs, emotions, and feelings. Psychological factors include an individual's motivation, attitudes, personal values, and beliefs. Social identity factors include culture, sub-culture, and reference groups. Other factors that may affect the purchase decision include the environment and the consumer's prior experience with the category or brand.

==== Motivations and emotions ====
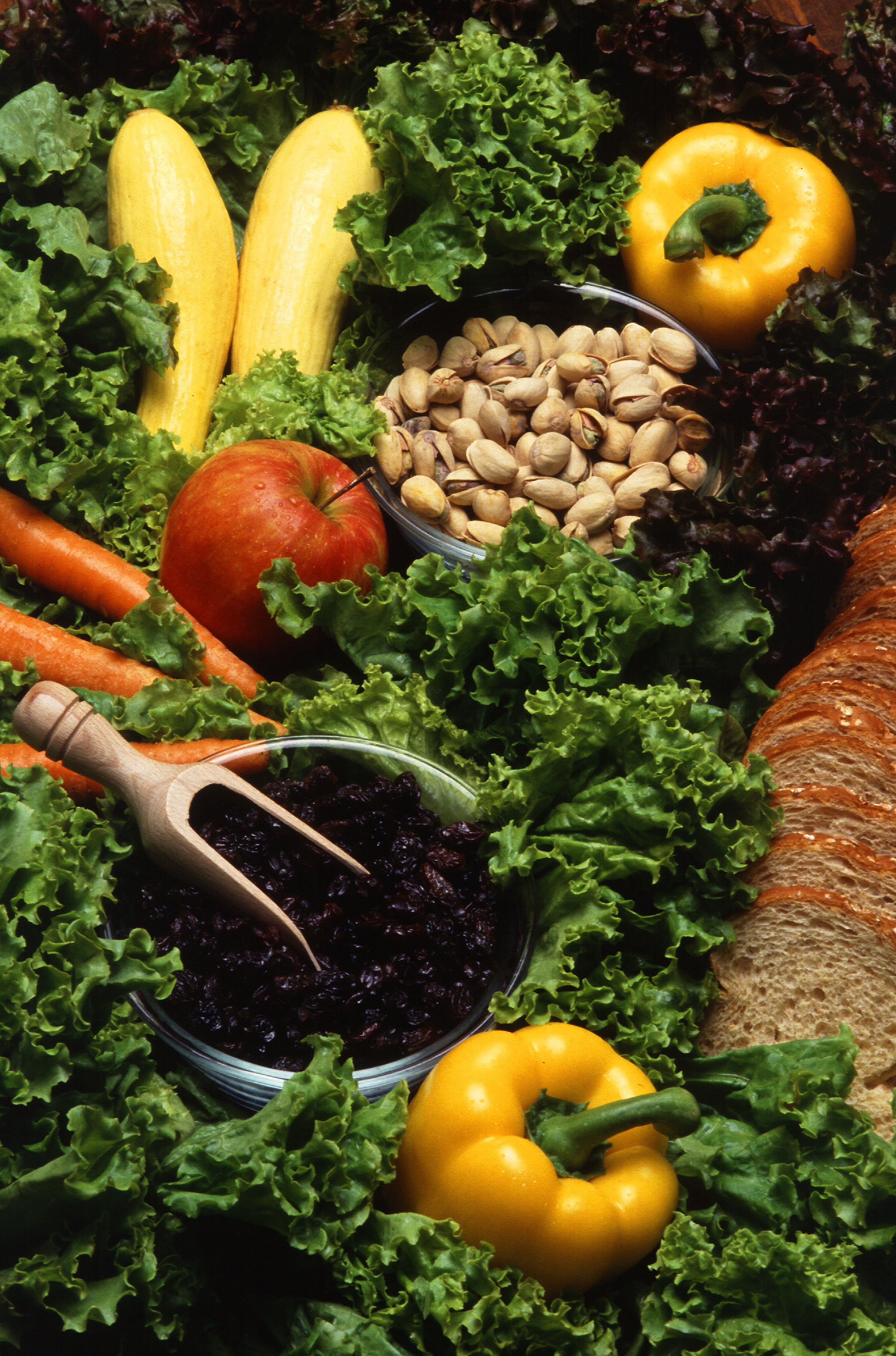
Maslow's hierarchy suggests that people seek to satisfy basic needs such as food and shelter before higher order needs become meaningful.

The consumer's underlying motivation drives consumer action, including the information search and purchase decision. The consumer's attitude to a brand (or brand preference) is described as a link between the brand and a purchase motivation. These motivations may be negative (to avoid pain or unpleasantness) or positive (to achieve some type of reward such as sensory gratification).

One approach to understanding motivations was developed by Abraham Maslow. Maslow's hierarchy of needs is based on five levels of needs, organised accordingly to the level of importance.

Maslow's five needs are:

Physiological
basic levels of needs such as food, water, and sleep
Safety
the need for physical safety, shelter, and security
Belonging
the need for love, friendship, and also a desire for group acceptance
Esteem
The need for status, recognition, and self-respect
Self-actualisation
The desire for self-fulfillment (e.g. personal growth, artistic expression)

Physiological needs and safety needs are the so-called lower order needs. Consumers typically use most of their resources (time, energy, and finances) attempting to satisfy these lower order needs before the higher order needs of belonging, esteem, and self-actualisation become meaningful. Part of any marketing program requires an understanding of which motives drive given product choices. Marketing communications can illustrate how a product or brand fulfills these needs. Maslow's approach is a generalised model for understanding human motivations in a wide variety of contexts, but is not specific to purchasing decisions.

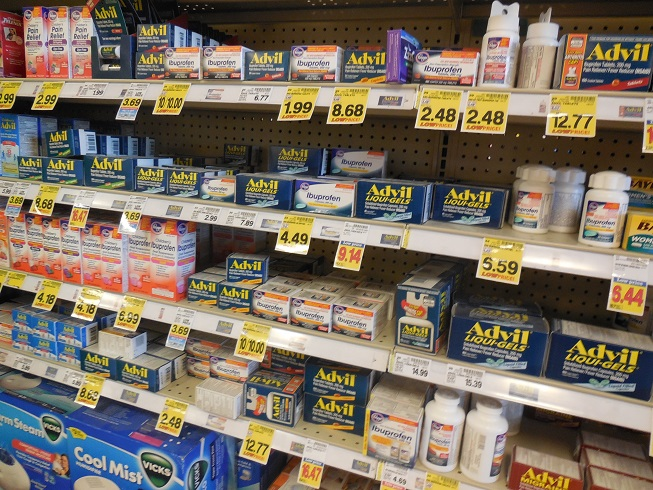
A decision to purchase an analgesic preparation is motivated by the desire to avoid pain (negative motivation).

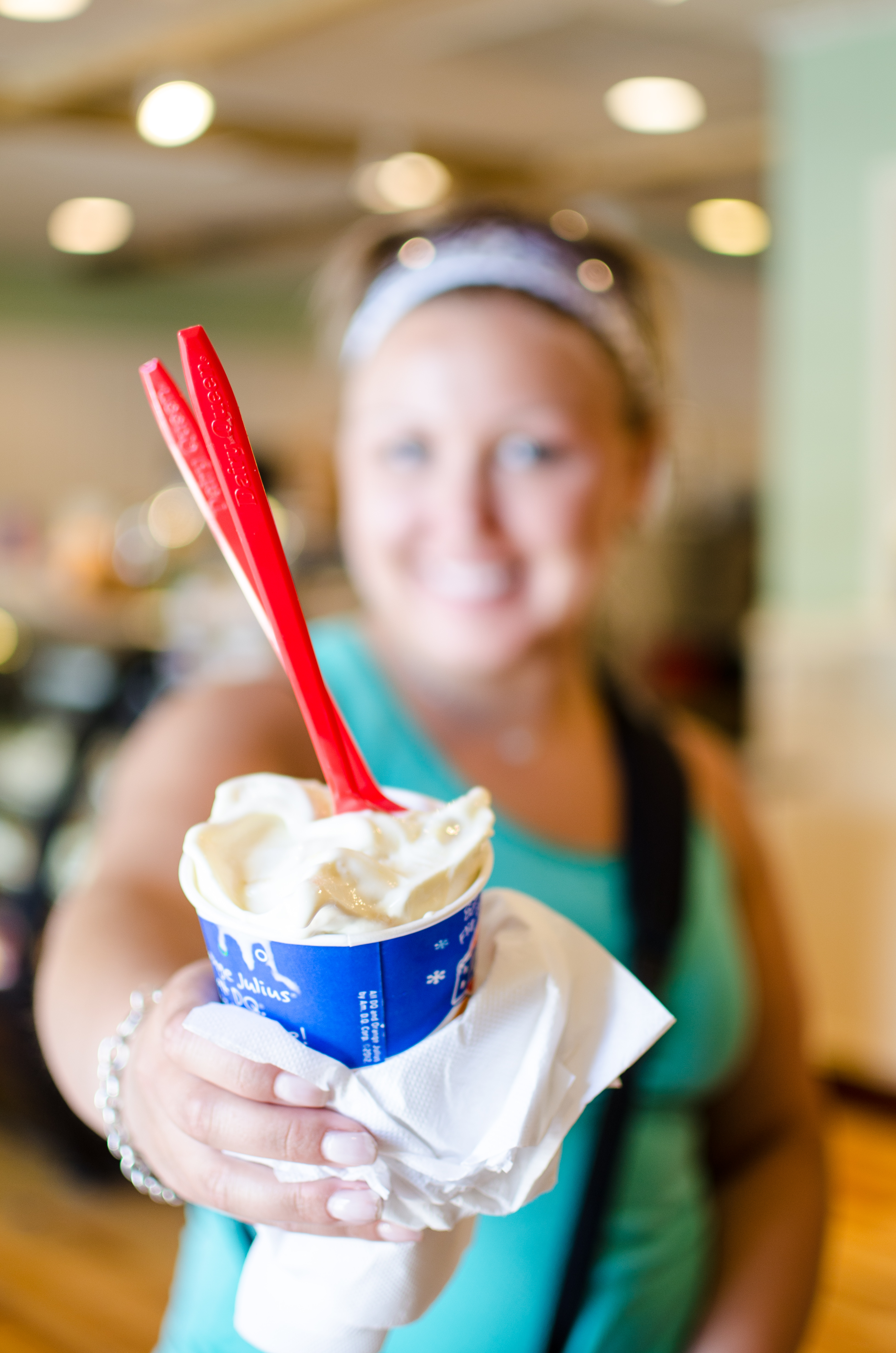
A decision to buy an ice-cream sundae is motivated by the desire for sensory gratification (positive motivation).

Another approach proposes eight purchase motivations, five negative motives and three positive motives, which energise purchase decisions as illustrated in the table below. These motivations are believed to provide positive reinforcement or negative reinforcement.

Rossiter and Percy's Purchase Motivations & Emotions
Motivation	Emotional Sequence
NEGATIVE	
Problem removal	Annoyance → Relief
Problem avoidance	Fear → Relaxation
Incomplete satisfaction	Disappointment → Optimism
Mixed approach avoidance	Conflict → Peace-of-mind
Normal depletion	Mild annoyance → Convenience
POSITIVE	
Sensory gratification	Dull (or neutral) → Sensory anticipation
Intellectual simulation	Bored (or neutral) → Excited
Social approval/conformity	Apprehensive (or ashamed) → Flattered/proud

In the marketing literature, the consumer's motivation to search for information and engage in the purchase decision process is sometimes known as involvement. Consumer involvement has been defined as "the personal relevance or importance of a message [or a decision]". Purchase decisions are classified as low involvement when consumers experience only a small psycho-social loss in the event that they make a poor decision. On the other hand, a purchase decision is classified as high involvement when psycho-social risks are perceived to be relatively high. The consumer's level of involvement is dependent on a number of factors including perceived risk of negative consequences in the event of a poor decision, the social visibility of the product, and the consumer's prior experience with the product category.

==== Perception ====
Part of a marketing strategy is to ascertain how consumers gain knowledge and use information from external sources. The perception process is the process by which individuals receive, organise, and interpret information in order to attribute meaning to it. Perception involves three distinct processes: sensing information, selecting information, and interpreting information. Sensation is also part of the perception process and is directly linked to responses from the senses, creating reactions towards the brand name, advertising, and packaging. The process of perception is uniquely individual and may depend on a combination of internal and external factors, such as experiences, expectations, needs, and the momentary set.

When exposed to a stimulus, consumers may respond in entirely different ways due to individual perceptual processes. A number of processes potentially support or interfere with perception. Selective exposure occurs when consumers decide whether to be exposed to information inputs. Selective attention occurs when consumers focus on some messages to the exclusion of others. Selective comprehension is where the consumer interprets information in a manner that is consistent with their own beliefs. Selective retention occurs when consumers remember some information while rapidly forgetting other information. Collectively the processes of selective exposure, attention, comprehension, and retention lead individual consumers to favor certain messages over others. The way that consumers combine information inputs to arrive at a purchase decision is known as integration.

Marketers are interested in consumer perceptions of brands, packaging, product formulations, labeling, and pricing. Of special interest is the threshold of perception (also known as the just noticeable difference) in a stimulus. For example, how much should a marketer lower a price before consumers recognise it as a bargain? In addition, marketers planning to enter global markets need to be aware of cultural differences in perception. For example, westerners associate the colour white with purity, cleanliness, and hygiene, but in eastern countries white is often associated with mourning and death. Accordingly, white packaging would be an inappropriate colour choice for food labels on products to be marketed in Asia.

==== Symbolic Consumer Behaviour ====
Symbolic consumption becomes the internal influence of consumer behaviour and forms a special symbol. Consumption symbols can be used to explain the consumer as a group member or a unique individual. Consumer consumption behaviour is not only material and psychological consumption. Symbolic consumption has two meanings: 1. A symbol of consumption. Consumption expresses and transmits a certain meaning and message. The meaning derived from culture enables us to use products to symbolise our membership in various social groups. This symbolic consumption is the process of social expression and social communication. 2. Symbolic consumption: People consume not only the commodities themselves but also certain cultural and social significance symbolised or represented by them, including mood, beauty, grade, status, status, atmosphere, style, emotional appeal, etc. Symbolic consumption is typically reflected in brand consumption. Brand has three functions for consumers: functional value, symbolic value and experience value. Take luxury brands: The power of luxury brands is more than just their ability to convey identity. Some consumers want to make an impression. Luxury goods used to be the daily routine of the aristocracy, but after the concept of modern social class was blurred, consumers still regarded it as a ticket to enter the upper class. Consumers evaluate a brand based on how it aligns with our identity, which helps define and maintain our self-concept. As a symbol of noble status, wealth and success, it has become a consumer identity and status symbol.

==== Prior experience ====
The consumer's prior experience with the category, product, or brand can have a major bearing on purchase decision-making. Experienced consumers (also called experts) are more sophisticated consumers; they tend to be more skillful information searchers, canvass a broader range of information sources, and use complex heuristics to evaluate purchase options. Novice consumers, on the other hand, are less efficient information searchers and tend to perceive higher levels of purchase risk on account of their unfamiliarity with the brand or category. When consumers have prior experience, they have less motivation to search for information and spend less effort on information search but can process new information more efficiently. One study, for example, found that as consumer experience increases, consumers consider a wider range of purchase alternatives (that is, they generate a larger consideration set, but only at the product category level).

==== Random factor ====
Random factors refer to special occasions and a series of random conditions consumers have when purchasing. Sometimes, consumer purchase decisions are made in unexpected circumstances, or a situation will delay or shorten people's decision-making process. Research has found that in waiting for scenarios where consumers are ubiquitous, seemingly unrelated physical cues, such as area carpets or queue guidelines, can act as virtual boundaries that alter consumers' initial decisions.

=== External influences on purchase decision ===
Purchasing behaviour can also be affected by external influences, such as culture, sub-culture, social class, reference groups, family, and situational determinants.

==== Culture ====
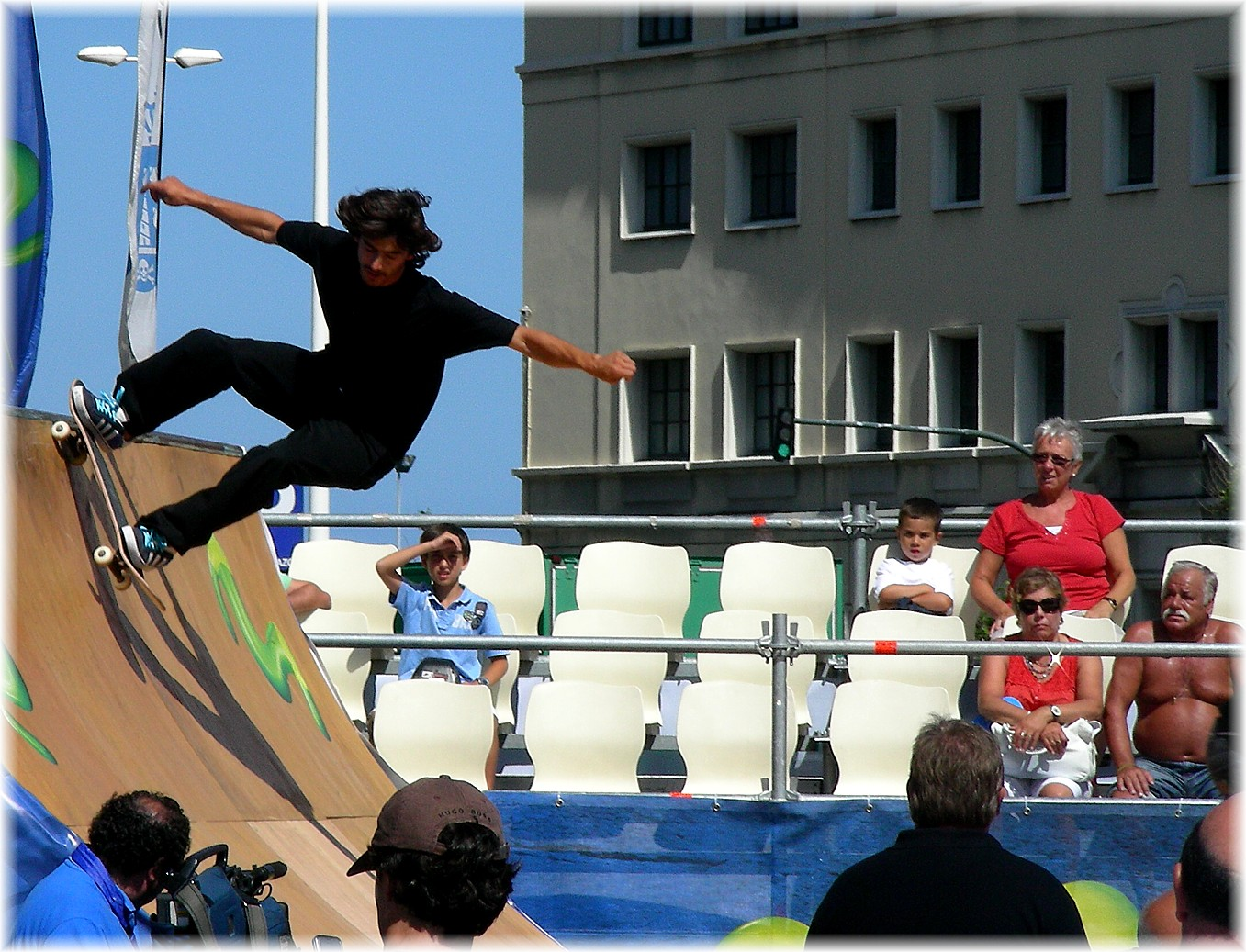
People with shared interests, such as skaters and bladers, tend to form informal groups known as subcultures.

Culture is the broadest and most abstract of the external factors. Culture refers to the complexity of learning meanings, values, norms, and customs shared by members of a society. Cultural norms are relatively stable over time, so culture has a major effect on consumer behaviour. Research studies have consistently shown that culture influences almost every aspect of purchasing: it affects basic psychological domains such as self-identity and motivation, the way that information is processed, and the way that advertising messages are interpreted. Additionally, perceived value and happiness are critical in shaping consumers' attitudes and behavioral intentions.

The cultural choice of consumption behaviour is influenced by two decisive factors: the external factor—the overall social and cultural atmosphere—and the internal factor—the consumer's artistic quality, aesthetic pursuit, and cultural value orientation. The cultural choice of consumption must be restricted by these two decisive factors, both inside and outside. The so-called social and cultural atmosphere is reflected in the influence of consumption atmosphere, customs, and trends on consumers. For example, all kinds of money-worship consumption criticised by public opinion are the influence of vulgar culture. The so-called internal factors mainly refer to what kind of spiritual realm and value orientation consumers adopt towards consumption, and what they show through consumption is a certain cultural mentality.

Marketers interested in global expansion are especially interested in understanding cross-cultural differences in purchasing and consumption. For instance, Ferrari, one of the world's top brands found that Chinese consumers are very different from their Western counterparts. Whereas consumers in the US, UK and Australia expect to wait 12 months for a custom-made Ferrari, prospective Chinese buyers are more likely to want to drive the vehicle off the showroom floor. China is an 'instant-gratification market'. Meaning buyers see their friends riding around in a luxury car and want to have the same as quickly as possible. To meet the growing demand for luxury goods, Ferrari and other luxury car makers have modified their production processes for Asian markets.

==== Subcultures ====
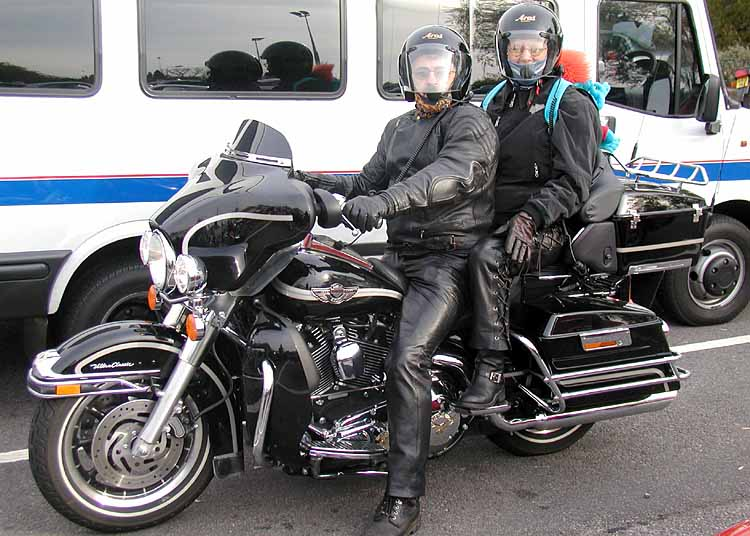
Harley-Davidson enthusiasts are an example of a consumption subculture.

Subcultures may be based on age, geographic, religious, racial, and ethnic differences. More often, however, a subculture occurs when people with shared interests form a loose-knit group with a distinctive identity (sometimes called consumer tribes). Members of subcultures are self-selected, and signal their membership status by adopting symbols, rituals, or behaviours that are widely understood by other members of the tribe (e.g. a dress code, hairstyle or even a unique way of speaking). For example, within youth culture it is possible to identify a number of sub-groups with common interests such as punks or goths. Generally known as communities, as they create a sense of belonging to something important.

A different type of subculture is a consumption subculture which is based on a shared commitment to a common brand or product. In other words, consumption subcultures cut across demographic, geographic, and social boundaries. The most well-known example of a consumption subculture is that of Harley-Davidson motorcycle owners. Ethnographic researchers who have studied Harley riders believe that there are only two types of motor cyclists: Harley owners and the rest. Harley-Davidson has leveraged the values of this subculture by establishing the Harley Owners Group (HOG).

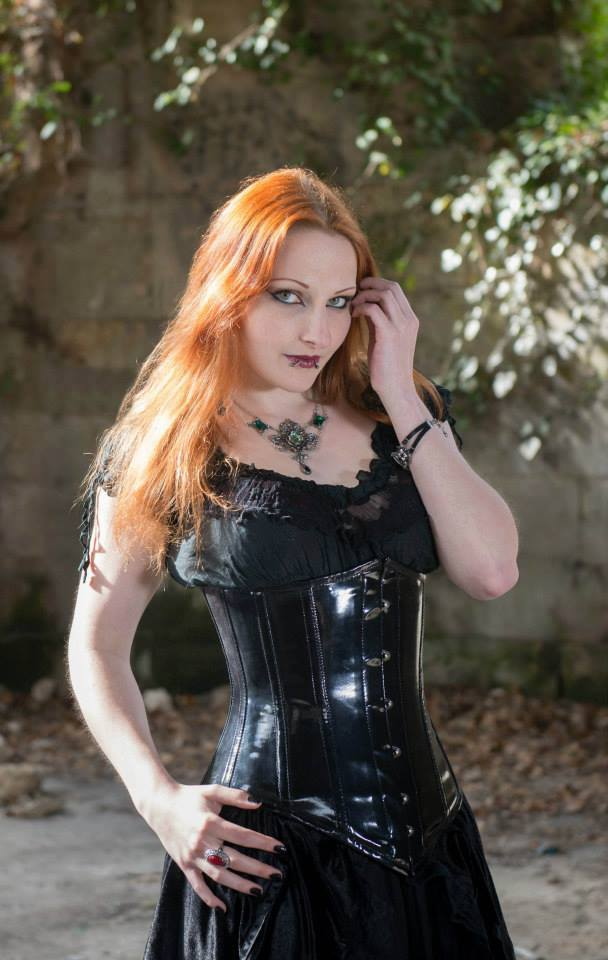
Members of the 'Goth' subculture share a dress code.

Subcultures are important to marketers for several reasons. Firstly, given that subcultures can represent sizeable market segments which are profitable and influential, there are obvious advantages in developing and selling products and services that meet the needs of subculture members. Secondly, and perhaps less obviously, many new fads and fashions emerge spontaneously from within these tribal groups. Trend-spotters are accordingly interested in studying the lifestyles and activities of tribes in an effort to spot new trends before they go mainstream.

==== Social class ====
Social class refers to relatively homogenous divisions in a society, typically based on socio-economic variables such as educational attainment, income, and occupation. Social class can be very difficult to define and measure, however marketers around the world tend to use a conventional classification which divides any given population into five socio-economic quintiles (e.g. In Australia the groups AB, C, D, E and FG, where AB is the top socio-economic quintile, but in much of Asia the quintiles are labelled I, II, III, IV and V where I is the top quintile). In Australia, for example, the AB socio-economic group account for just 24% of the population, but control 50% of discretionary spending. The top quintiles (i.e. AB socio-economic segments) are of particular interest to marketers of luxury goods and services such as travel, dining-out, entertainment, luxury cars, investment or wealth management services, up-market consumer electronics, and designer labels (e.g. Louis Vuitton). However, middle-class consumers tend to consume more carefully in comparison and collect information to compare different producers in the same line. Those who are lower-class consumers tend to buy more on impulse in comparison to the wealthy class who purchases goods to maintain social status.

==== Reference groups ====
A reference group is defined as "a group whose presumed perspectives or values are being used by an individual as the basis for his or her judgment, opinions, and actions". Reference groups are important because they are used to guide an individual's attitudes, beliefs and values. Insights into how consumers acquire a given value system can be obtained from an understanding of group influence and group socialisation processes.

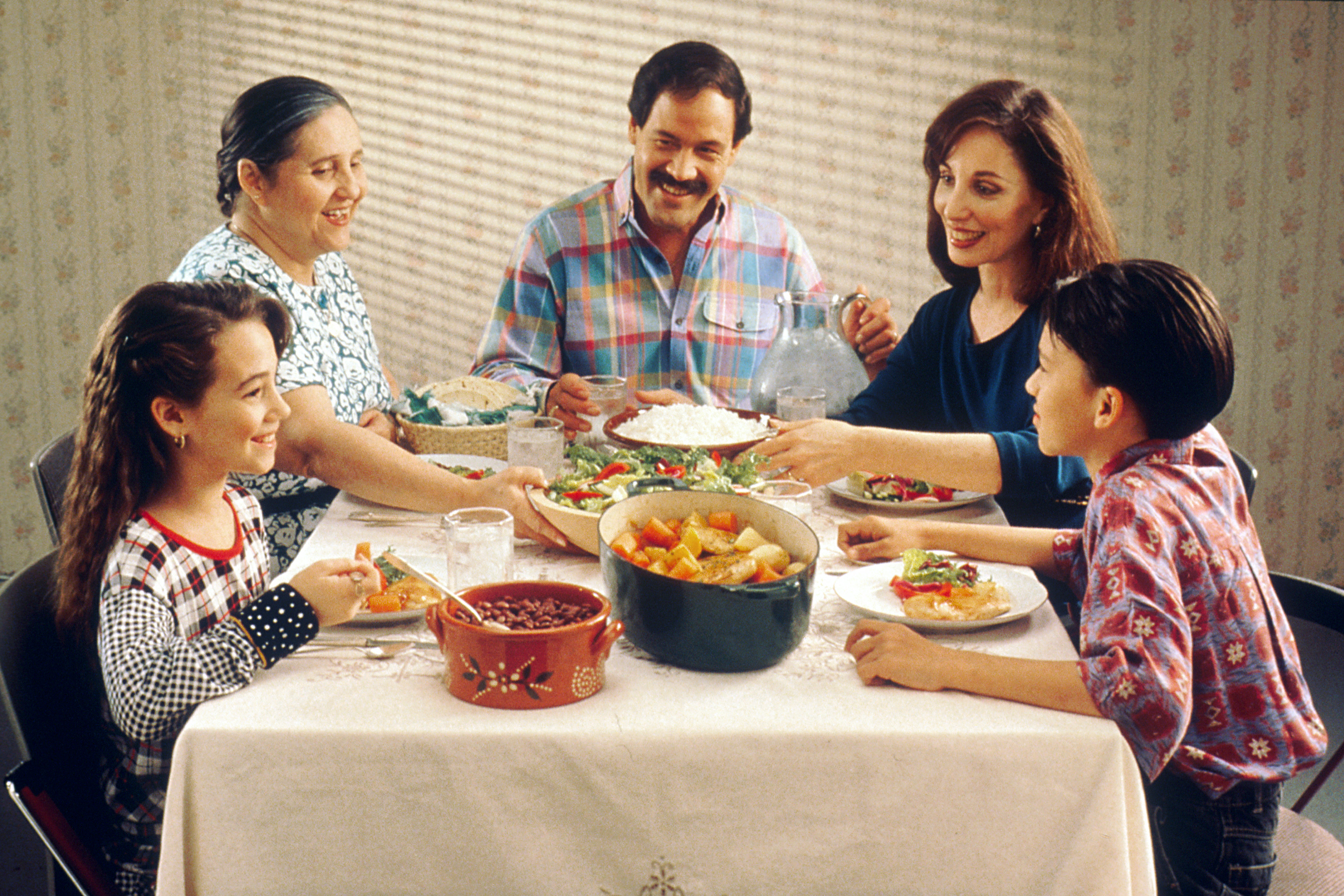
The family, a primary reference group, exerts a strong influence on attitudes and behaviours.

The literature identifies five broad types of reference group: primary, secondary, aspirational, dissociative and formal:

Primary groups: groups, such as family, that exert a strong influence on attitudes and behaviours
Secondary groups: groups such as clubs, societies, sports teams, political parties, religions that align with a person's ideas or values, but exert a less fundamental influence on the formation of attitudes and behaviours
Aspirational groups groups to which an individual does not currently belong, but possibly aspires to become a member because the group possesses characteristics which are admired.
Disassociative reference groups - a group which has a negative image; individuals may disapprove of the disassociative group's values, attitudes or behaviours and may seek to distance themselves from such groups.

Opinion Leaders can act like reference groups in that they exert considerable social influence because of their product knowledge, expertise and credibility. In the marketing literature, opinion leaders are also known as influencers, mavens, and even hubs. Opinion leaders are specific to a product category, so that an opinion leader for computers is not likely to be an opinion leader for fashion. Typically, opinion leaders have high levels of involvement with the product category, are heavy users of the category, and tend to be early adopters of new technologies within the category. Journalists, celebrities, and bloggers are good examples of an opinion leader due to their broad social networks and increased ability to influence people's decisions. Indeed, recent evidence suggests that bloggers may be emerging as a more important group of opinion leaders than celebrities.

In order to leverage the value of opinion leaders in marketing strategies, it is important to be able to identify the unique opinion leaders for each category or situation and this can be very challenging. Some techniques that can be used are through key informants, socio-metric techniques and self-questionnaires. More often, however, marketers use gut instinct to identify opinion leaders. For example, marketers of athletic shoes have been known to provide gym and aerobic instructors with free shoes in the hope that class members will adopt the same brand as the instructor. Marketers of cosmetics and skincare preparations regularly provide fashion editors with free samples in the hope that their products will be mentioned in fashion magazines.

=== Influences on consumer purchasing behaviours during the COVID-19 pandemic ===
Evidence shows that certain consumer purchasing behaviours rose to prominence during the COVID-19 pandemic as result of external and internal factors. Namely, behaviours such as compulsive buying, impulsive buying, panic buying, and revenge buying – where panic buying and revenge buying were most noticeable – proved as a coping strategy for alleviating consumers' negative responses to the pandemic.

Panic buying occurs when consumers purchase more things than usual as a consequence of adverse feelings of fear, anxiety and uncertainty surrounding a crisis or disruptive event. Such purchases tend to be excessive in relation to the perceived threat. During the pandemic, panic buying of necessities, such as food and hygiene products, increased across the globe. Consider, in particular, that Australia faced an unprecedented spike in toilet paper sales, prompting comments from its Prime Minister. Panic buying – in response to an irrational fear of scarcity of products and heightened urgency to procure coveted items – provided a sense of control for consumers during the pandemic, notwithstanding a loss of control to the social, professional and health environments around them.

In addition to panic buying throughout the pandemic, revenge buying was apparent during periods when non-essential stores reopened after COVID-19-related lockdowns. Revenge buying was specifically observed in physical luxury retail stores. For example, it was reported that an Hermes store in Guangzhou, China, made US$2.7 million in the first day it opened after lockdown, where consumers' purchases ranged from leather goods, scarves and homewares to a diamond-studded Birkin bag, among other things.

The purchase of luxury products – where 'luxury' is defined as high quality, expensive and non-necessary – is associated with positive emotions, often to compensate for negative feelings. Namely, revenge buying of luxury products provided an emotional release and a sense of belonging, esteem, and self-actualisation during the COVID-19 pandemic, in which people were frustrated and psychologically discomforted. Such purchases can be said to have achieved sensory gratification as well as problem avoidance for consumers.

It is clear that consumers sought to obtain internal happiness through consumption as a response to external health crises and social distancing measures. Both panic buying and revenge buying were compensatory in nature and therapeutic in nature – an attempt for consumers to control an external situation that was out of their internal control, as well as provide comfort, security, and improvement of well-being.

Due to the environmental trends, people begin to shop online more to avoid physical stores and stay contactless. Customers will spend more on sportswear than on professional dressing in 2020, and technology products related to teleworking, such as Zoom, also have more consumers than before.

Besides, studies have suggested that after the pandemic, people's awareness of environmental hazards and society's responsibility to save the planet increased, so societies changed their shopping behavior during the pandemic. People will choose sustainable products even though they cost more. In addition, stores and brands can adopt sustainable marketing to build a new brand image to attract customers.

Kannan and Kulkarni also illustrate some phenomena led by the channel migration caused by COVID-19. The first phenomenon is that customers are more open-minded to trying new brands and products because of the limitation of online channels of certain brands; the second phenomenon is that the long time pandemic restrictions make customers who use online channels as substitutes for their offline purchases initially now those customers have learned how to effectively use online channels for their daily lives.

== Consumer decision styles ==
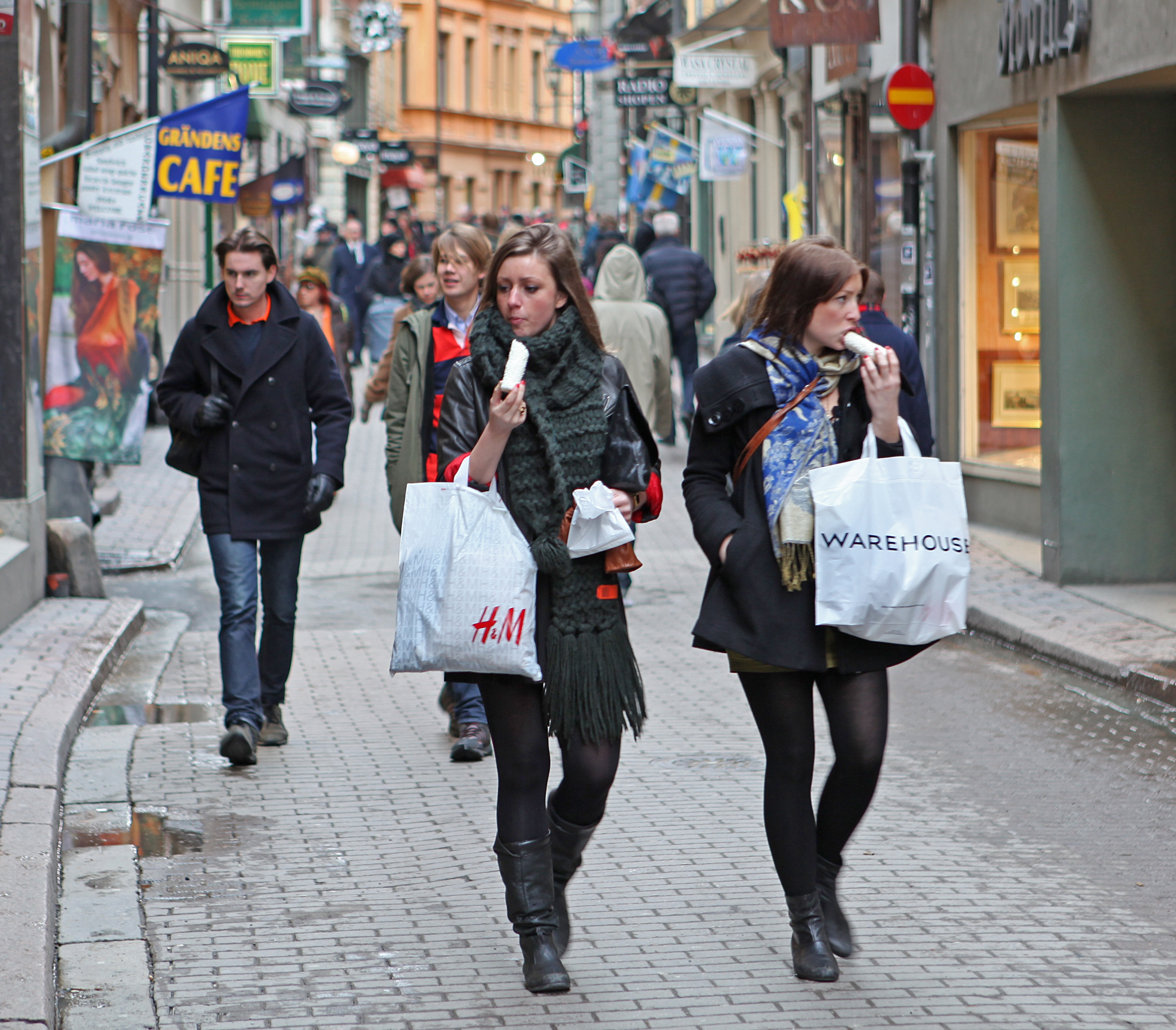
Those who shop for pleasure are said to be recreational shoppers.

A number of theorists have argued that certain fundamental decision-making styles can be identified. A decision-making style is defined as a "mental orientation characterising a consumer's approach to making choices." Sproles and Kendall (1986) developed a consumer style inventory (CSI) consisting of eight factors, such as price-sensitivity, quality-consciousness, brand-consciousness, novelty-seeking, fashion-consciousness, and habit. Based on these factors, the authors developed a typology of eight distinct decision-making styles:

- Quality conscious/Perfectionist: characterised by a consumer's search for the very best quality in products; quality conscious consumers tend to shop systematically making more comparisons and shopping around to compare quality and value.
- Brand-conscious: characterised by a tendency to buy expensive, well-known brands, or designer labels. Those who score high on brand-consciousness tend to believe that the higher prices are an indicator of quality and exhibit a preference for department stores or top-tier retail outlets. The concept of Brand Consciousness can be defined as the awareness of the brand and its product offerings that are quite distinctive from the other brands in the market having a competitive advantage. The consumers are very concerned about what the brand company thinks about its name and products.
- Recreation-conscious/Hedonistic: characterised by the consumer's engagement in the purchase process. Those who score high on recreation-consciousness regard shopping itself as a form of enjoyment.
- Price-conscious: characterised by price-and-value consciousness. Price-conscious shoppers carefully shop around seeking lower prices, sales, or discounts and are motivated by obtaining the best value for money.
- Novelty/fashion-conscious: characterised by a consumer's tendency to seek out new products or new experiences for the sake of excitement; who gain excitement from seeking new things; they like to keep up-to-date with fashions and trends. Variety-seeking is associated with this dimension.
- Impulsive: characterised by carelessness in making purchase decisions, spur of the moment purchases, and lack of significant concern with expenditure levels or obtaining value. Those who score high on impulsive dimensions tend not to be engaged with the object at either a cognitive or emotional level.
- Confused (by over-choice): characterised by a consumer's confusion caused by too many product choices, too many stores, or an overload of product information. A result of information overload.
- Habitual/brand loyal: characterised by a consumer's tendency to follow a routine purchase pattern on each purchase occasion; consumers have favourite brands or stores and have formed habits in choosing so the purchase decision does not involve much evaluation or shopping around.

The Consumer Styles Inventory (CSI) has been extensively tested and retested in a wide variety of countries and purchasing contexts. Many empirical studies have observed cross-cultural variations in decision styles, leading to numerous adaptations or modifications of the CSI scale for use in specific countries. Consumer decision styles are important for marketers because they describe behaviours that are relatively stable over time and are therefore useful for market segmentation.

== Other topics in consumer behaviour ==
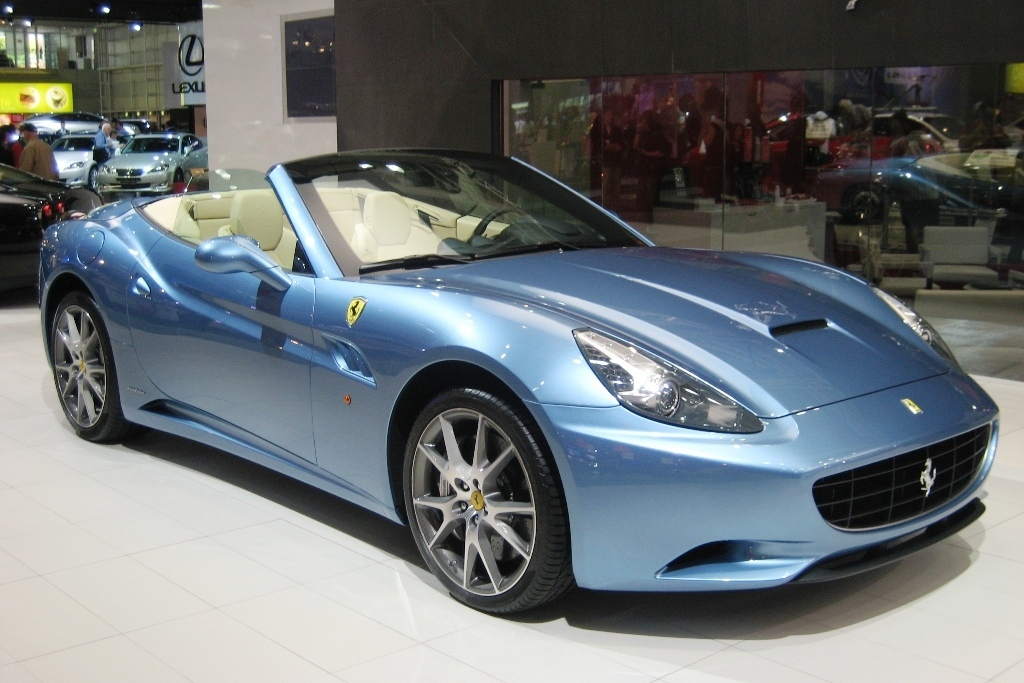
The purchase of an up-market sports car carries both financial risk and social risk, because it is an expensive purchase and it makes a highly visible statement about the driver.

In addition to understanding the purchasing decision, marketers are interested in a number of different aspects of consumer behaviour that occur before, during, and after making a purchase choice. Areas of particular interest include risk perception and risk reduction activities, brand switching, channel switching, brand loyalty, customer citizenship behaviours, and post purchase behavioural intentions and behaviours including brand advocacy, referrals, word of mouth activity etc.

=== Risk perception and risk reduction activities ===
The consumer's perceptions of risk are a major consideration in the pre-purchase stage of the purchasing decision. Perceived risk is defined as "the consumer's perceptions of the uncertainty and adverse consequences of engaging in an activity". Risk consists of two dimensions: consequences which refer to the degree of importance or the severity of an outcome and uncertainty which is the consumer's subjective assessment of the likelihood of occurrence. For example, many tourists are fearful of air travel because, although the probability of being involved in an airline accident is very low, the consequences are potentially dire.

The marketing literature identifies many different types of risk, of which five are the most frequently cited:

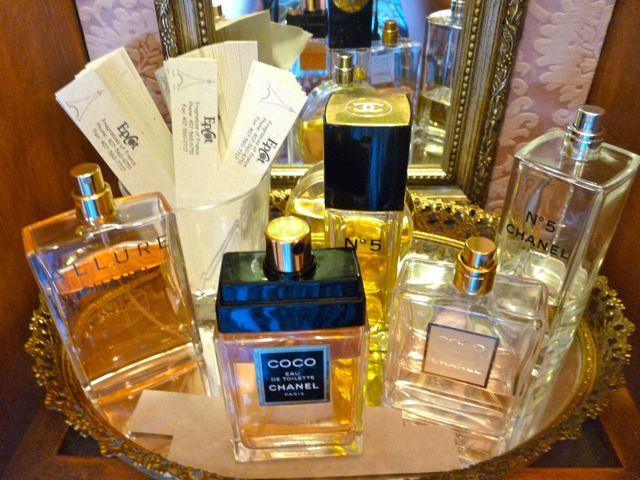
Facilitating trial of a product may help to alleviate risk perceptions.

- Financial Risk: the potential financial loss in the event of a poor decision
- Performance Risk (also known as functional risk): the idea that a product or service will not perform as intended
- Physical Risk: the potential for physical harm if something goes wrong with a purchase
- Social Risk: the potential for loss of social status associated with a purchase
- Psychological Risk: the potential for a purchase to result in a loss of self-esteem

If a consumer perceives a purchase to be risky, they will engage in strategies to reduce the perceived risk until it is within their tolerance levels or, if they are unable to do so, withdraw from the purchase. Thus, the consumer's perceptions of risk drive information search activities.

Services marketers have argued that risk perception is higher for services because they lack the search attributes of products (i.e. tangible properties that can be inspected prior to consumption). In terms of risk perception, marketers and economists identify three broad classes of purchase: search goods, experience goods, and credence goods with implications for consumer evaluation processes. Search goods, which include most tangible products, possess tangible characteristics that allow consumers to evaluate quality prior to purchase and consumption. Experience goods, such as restaurants and clubs, can only be evaluated with certainty after purchase or consumption. In the case of credence goods, such as many professional services, the consumer finds it difficult to fully appreciate the quality of the goods even after purchase and consumption has occurred. Difficulties evaluating quality after consumption may arise because the cost of obtaining information is prohibitive, or because the consumer lacks the requisite skills and knowledge to undertake such evaluations. These goods are called credence products because the consumer's quality evaluations depend entirely on the trust given to the product manufacturer or service provider.

Typical risk-reduction strategies used include:

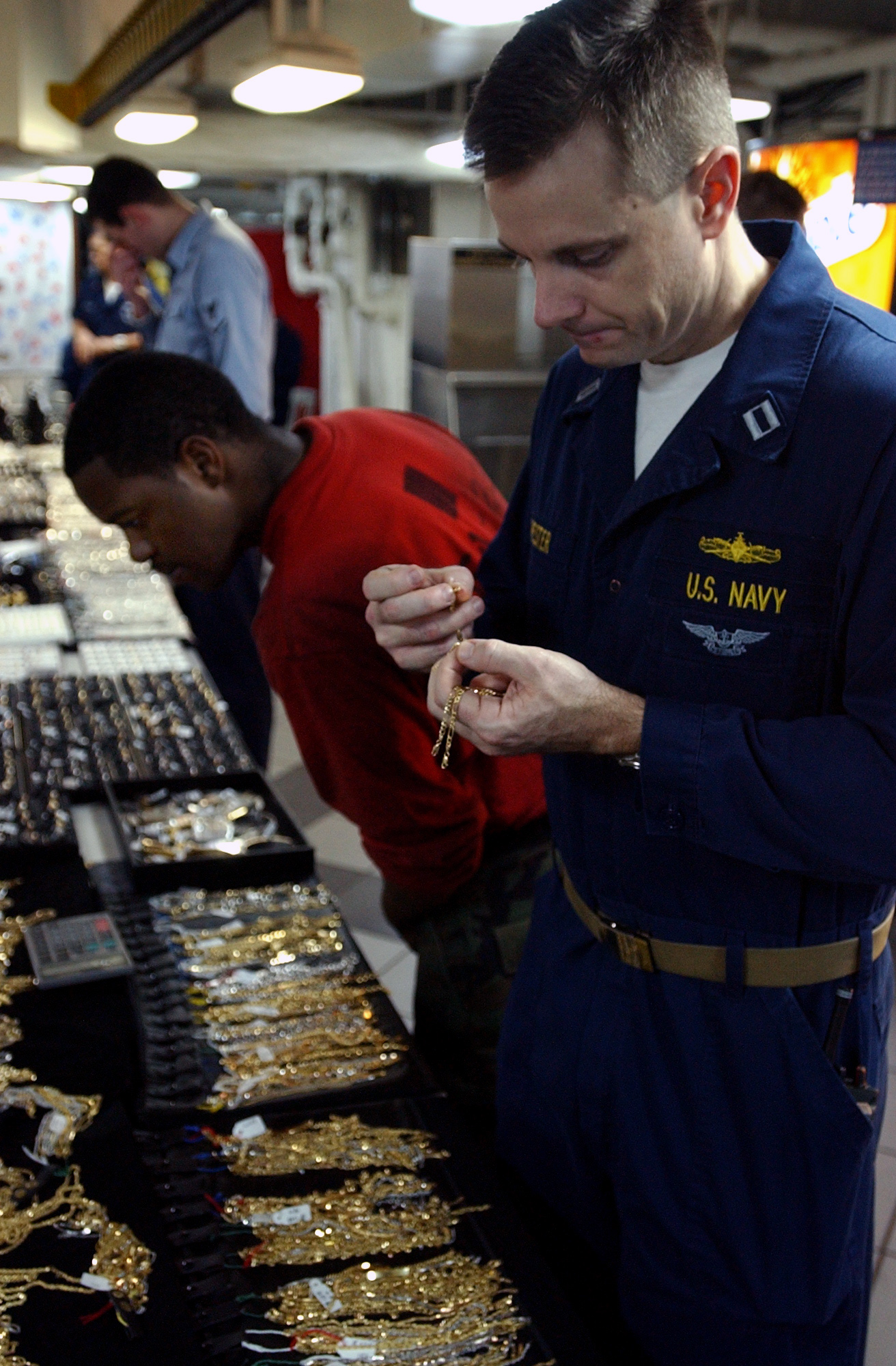
Prospective purchasers carefully inspect the merchandise before purchasing expensive gold jewellery.

- Advertising and Promotional Messages: pay closer attention to product or brand related promotion including advertising messages
- Shopping Around: comparing offers and prices, inspecting the merchandise
- Buy Known Brand: using a known, reputable brand as an indicator of quality merchandise
- Buy from Reputable Store: relying on a reputable retail outlet as an indicator of quality
- Product Reviews: reading independent reviews in main media (e.g. newspapers, magazines), written by independent experts
- Online product reviews or consumer-generated testimonials: reading about the experiences of other consumers (e.g. TripAdvisor, Amazon customer reviews)
- Sampling or Limited-scale Trial: where practical, obtaining samples, free trial or a 'test-drive' prior to purchase
- Manufacturer Specifications: reading information provided by manufacturers e.g. brochures or specs
- Referrals: obtaining referrals from friends or relatives
- Sales Representatives: talking to sales reps in retail outlets
- Product Guarantees: looking for formal guarantees or warranties

=== New product adoption and diffusion of innovations ===
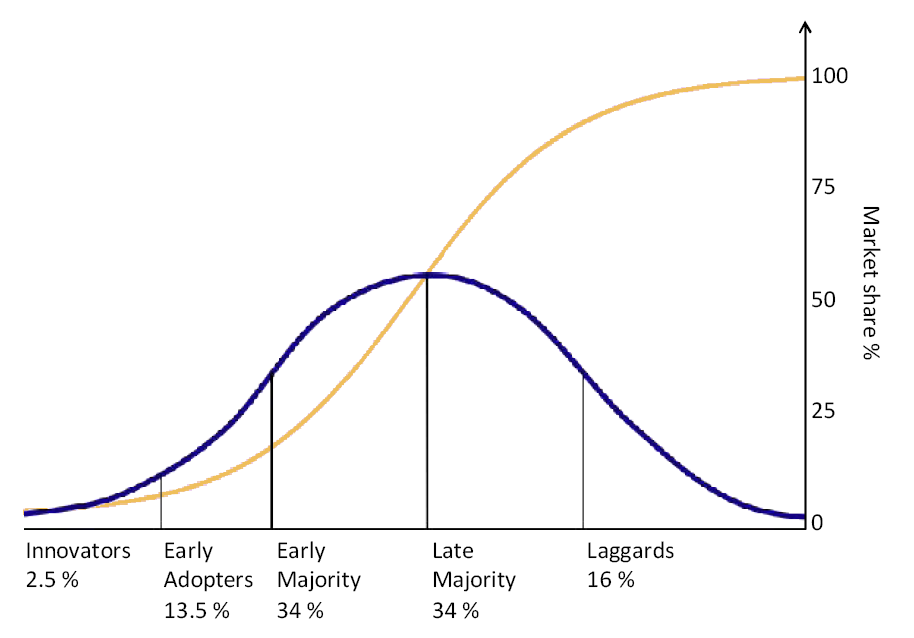
The diffusion of innovations according to Rogers. As successive groups of consumers adopt the innovation(shown in blue), its market share (yellow) will eventually reach saturation level.

Within consumer behaviour, a particular area of interest is the study of how innovative new products, services, ideas, or technologies spread through groups. Insights about how innovations are diffused (i.e., spread) through populations can assist marketers to speed up the new product adoption process and fine-tune the marketing program at different stages of the diffusion process. In addition, diffusion models provide benchmarks against which new product introductions can be tracked.

A sizeable body of literature has been devoted to the diffusion of innovation. Research studies tend to fall into two broad categories: general diffusion research which is an approach that seeks to understand the general process of diffusion and applied diffusion research which consists of studies that describe the diffusion of specific products at particular moments in time or within given social communities. Collectively these studies suggest a certain regularity in the adoption process; initially few members adopt the innovation but over time successive, overlapping waves of people begin to adopt the innovation. This pattern contributes to a generalised S-shaped curve, as shown in the figure at right. However, the exact shape and timing of curves varies in different product markets such that some innovations are diffused relatively quickly, while others can take many years to achieve broad market acceptance.

The diffusion model developed by Everett Rogers is widely used in consumer marketing because it segments consumers into five groups, based on their rate of new product adoption. Rogers defines the diffusion of innovation as the process by which that innovation is "communicated through certain channels over time among the members of a social system." Thus the diffusion process has a number of elements, the innovation, the communication channels, time and the social system. An innovation is any new idea, object or process that is perceived as new by members of the social system. Communication channels are the means by which information about the innovation is transmitted to members of the social system and may include mass media, digital media and personal communications between members of the social system. Time refers to the rate at which the innovation is picked up by the members of the social system.

Table 1: Adopter Categories

Adopter Group	Proportion of All Adopters	Psycho-social and Demographic Characteristics
Innovators	2.5%	adopt new products or concepts well ahead of the social community; venturesome; like new ideas; are willing to accept some uncertainty/risk in purchase decision-making; are active information seekers; cosmopolitan; move in broad social circles; have access to financial resources (which helps absorb potential losses when innovations fail); tend to be heavy users or category enthusiasts (e.g. tech-heads are the first to adopt new communications technologies); tend to be younger, well-educated, and affluent
Early adopters	13.5%	second group to adopt new products or concepts; not too far ahead of the community in terms of innovativeness; have the respect of their social communities; potential adopters look to early adopters as role models; are important opinion leaders; higher social status and well-educated
Early majority	34%	third group to adopt new products or concepts; adopt innovations only marginally ahead of the community average; tend to be more deliberate in purchase decision-making; average social status and education levels
Late majority	34%	adopt new products or concepts slightly later than average; skeptical in purchase decision-making; adoption is often a response to social community pressures
Laggards	16%	last group to adopt new products or concepts; highly cautious; need to be confident that an innovation will not fail before purchasing; are the most risk-averse of all adopter segments; dislike change; traditionalists; resistant to change; look to the past; somewhat isolated within their social community; often adopt innovations when they are becoming obsolete; tend to be older, less well educated, and less affluent

A number of factors contribute to the rate at which innovations are diffused through a social community.

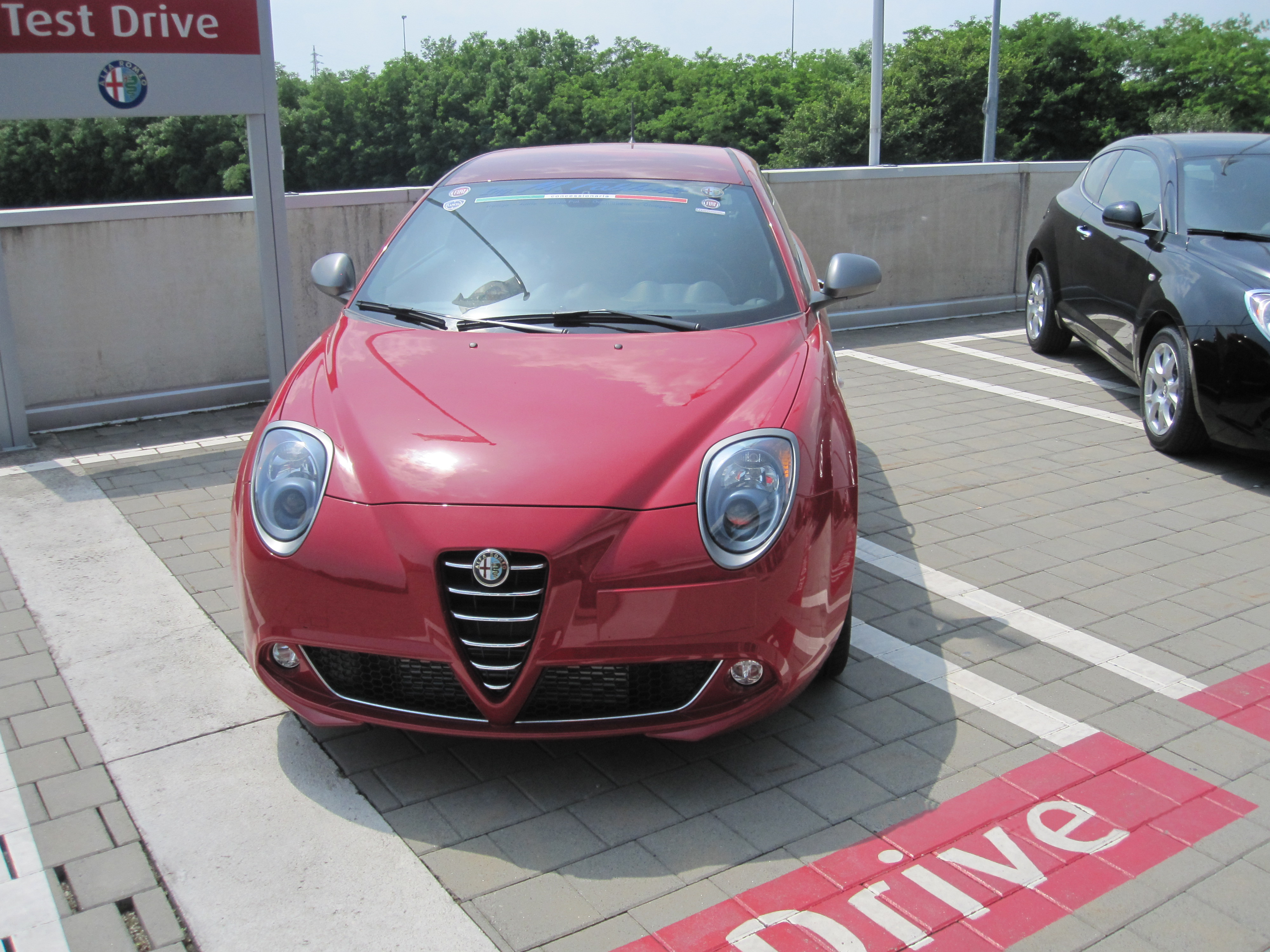
Facilitating a 'test-drive' can encourage consumers to speed up adoption rates.

- Relative advantage: the degree to which an innovation is perceived to be superior to alternatives
- Compatibility: the extent to which an innovation fits in with an individual's values, lifestyles and past experiences
- Complexity: the degree to which an innovation is perceived to be easy or difficult to understand and use
- Trialability: the extent to which an individual can experiment with the innovation on a limited scale prior to adoption
- Observability: the degree to which the results of the innovation are visible to other members of the social community

Innovations with some or all of these factors are more likely to be adopted quickly. Accordingly, marketing communications may stress the innovation's relative benefits over other solutions to the consumer's problem. Marketing messages may also focus on compatibility and observability. Marketers can also facilitate adoption by offering limited scale trial (e.g. samples, test drives, sale on approval) enabling consumers to develop an understanding of the innovation and how it is used prior to purchase.

Studies have shown that the diffusion rate for many new technologies is speeding up. The figure in the Household Penetration of Selected Communications Technologies report illustrates U.S. household penetration rates of selected communications technologies, measured as a percentage of all households. The slope of the curve becomes steeper with each successive innovation indicating a more rapid diffusion rate. For example, it took decades for the telephone to achieve 50 percent penetration rates beginning in around 1900, but it took less than five years for cellphones to achieve the same penetration rates. In order to explain the increasing pace of adoption, some have pointed to supply-side issues such as reduced barriers to entry and lower costs of innovation, while others have argued that consumers drive adoption rates because they place a high value on the convenience of new innovations.

=== Brand-switching ===
Brand-switching occurs when a consumer chooses to purchase a different brand from their regular or customary brand. Consumers switch brands for a variety of reasons including that the store did not have the regular brand or the consumer's desire for variety or novelty in brand choice. In the fast moving consumer goods market (FMCG), the incidence of switching is relatively high. A great deal of marketing activity is targeted at brand-switchers. Rossiter and Bellman have proposed a classification of consumers based on brand-loyalty/switching behaviour:

Brand Loyals
Purchase preferred brand on almost every purchase occasion
Favourable Brand Switchers
Exhibit moderate preference for the brand or brands that they buy and can be readily enticed to purchase competing brands
Other Brand Switchers
Normally purchase a competing brand, possibly because they are unaware of our brand or due to a negative experience with our brand
New Category Users
Those who are unaware of a category but have potential to become new users

Marketers are particularly interested in understanding the factors that lead to brand-switching. A global, large sample survey carried out by Nielsen shows that four in 10 shoppers (41%) said that getting a better price would encourage them to switch brands (or service provider/retailer), 26% said quality was an incentive to switch, 15% looked for a better service agreement and 8% said that improved features are a switching incentive. However, cross-cultural differences were observed among respondents. Price was the major switch incentive for more than half of North Americans (61%) and Europeans (54%) but price and quality held equal sway in Asia-Pacific and Middle East/Africa, with roughly one-third of respondents each in both regions reporting that both price and quality were the major incentives to switching.

The concept of switching costs (also known as switching barriers) is pertinent to the understanding of brand switching. Switching costs refer to the costs incurred by a consumer when they switch from one supplier to another (or from one brand to another). Although switching costs are often monetary, the concept can also refer to psychological costs such as time, effort, and inconvenience incurred as a result of switching. When switching costs are relatively low, as in the case of many fast moving consumer goods (FMCG), the incidence of brand switching tends to be higher. An example of switching that includes both monetary and psychological costs is when Android or Apple users wish to switch to a different platform, they would need to sacrifice their data, including purchased music tracks, apps, or media and may also need to learn new routines to become an efficient user.

On the contrary, a key strategy to control the perception of a product to prevent brand switching through marketing is the halo effect. First coined by Edward Thorndike, the halo effect refers to the phenomenon whereby a product is viewed under a positive light because of the overall positive perception of the brand, of a concept highlighted in the marketing or related to its packaging. Similarly, the products of luxury brands such as Hermes or Louis Vuitton are also influenced by the halo effect. Similarly, in the food industry, packaging that includes the words "Ecological" or "Organic," tends to create a halo effect around the quality and healthiness of the product.

=== Channel-switching ===
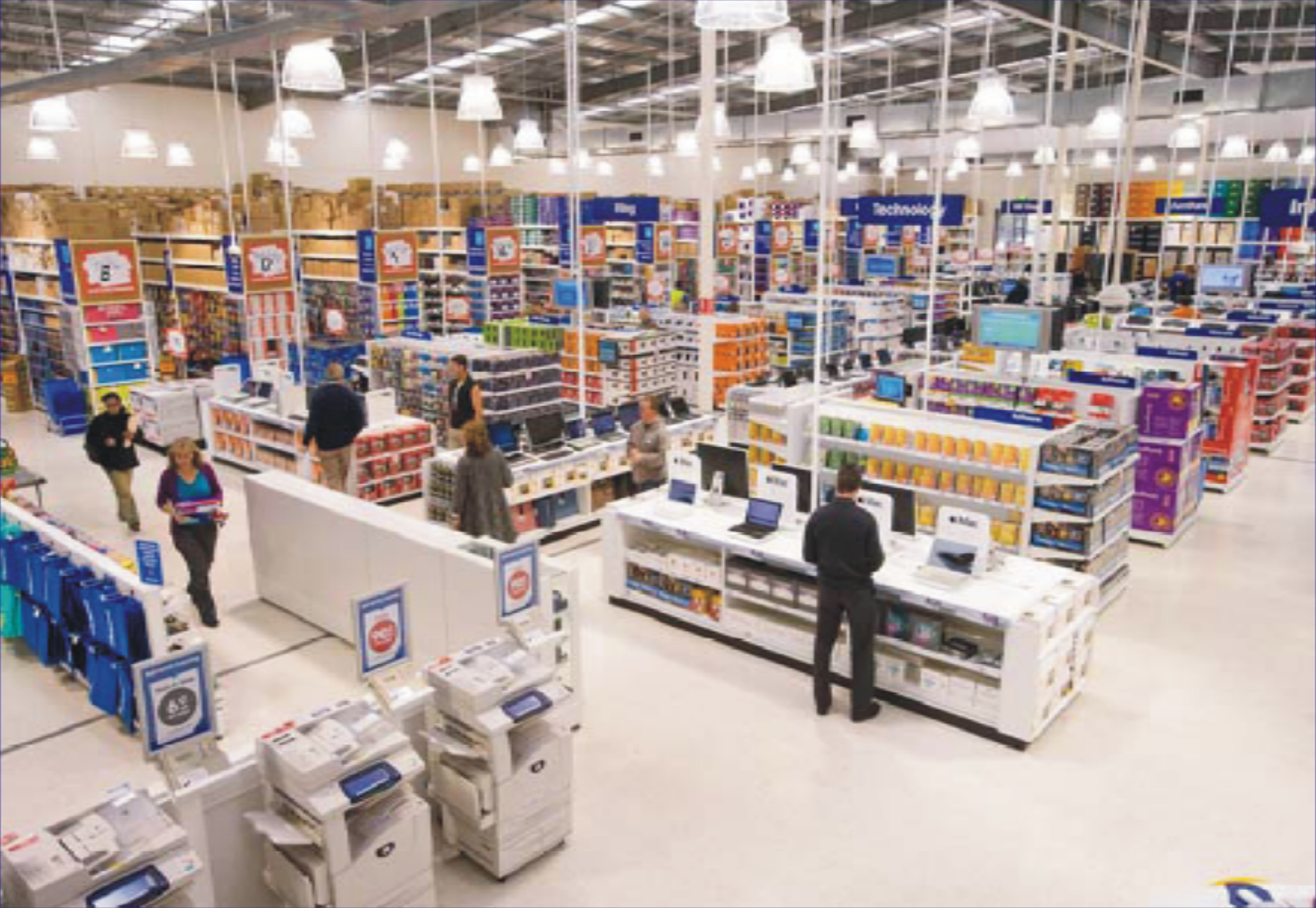
The advent of "category killers", such as Australia's Officeworks, has contributed to an increase in channel switching behaviour.

Channel-switching (not to be confused with zapping or channel surfing on TV) is the action of consumers switching to a different purchasing environment (or distribution channel) to purchase goods, such as switching from brick-and-mortar stores to the internet. A major reason for this channel switching behaviour is the convenience that online shopping provides for consumers. Consumers can shop online at any hour of the day, without having to drive, travel or walk to a physical store, and browse for as little or as much time as they please. The additional lure of 'online only' deals and discounts helps enforce a consumer's preference to shop online. Other factors for this shift are the globalisation of markets, the advent of category killers (such as Officeworks and Kids 'R Us) as well as changes in the legal regulatory environment. For instance, in Australia and New Zealand, following a relaxation of laws prohibiting supermarkets from selling therapeutic goods, consumers are gradually switching away from pharmacies and towards supermarkets for the purchase of minor analgesics, cough and cold preparations and complementary medicines such as vitamins and herbal remedies.

For the consumer, channel switching offers a more diverse shopping experience. However, marketers need to be alert to channel switching because of its potential to erode market share. Evidence of channel switching can suggest that disruptive forces are at play, and that consumer behaviour is undergoing fundamental changes. A consumer may be prompted to switch channels when the product or service can be found cheaper, when superior models become available, when a wider range is offered, or simply because it is more convenient to shop through a different channel (e.g. online or one-stop shopping). As a hedge against market share losses due to switching behaviour, some retailers engage in multi-channel retailing.

=== Impulse buying ===
According to 1962 research from Hawkins Stern, impulse purchases fall into four categories: including pure impulse buying, reminded impulse buying, suggestion impulse buying, and planned impulse buying. While pure impulse buying involves a customer experiencing strong desire for a product they didn't initially plan to buy, reminded impulse buying occurs when a buyer remembers a need for a product by seeing it in a store. Suggestion impulse buying occurs when a consumer sees a product that they have no prior knowledge about, envisions a use for it, and decides that they need it, and planned impulse buying happens when a consumer's purchasing plan changes while shopping.

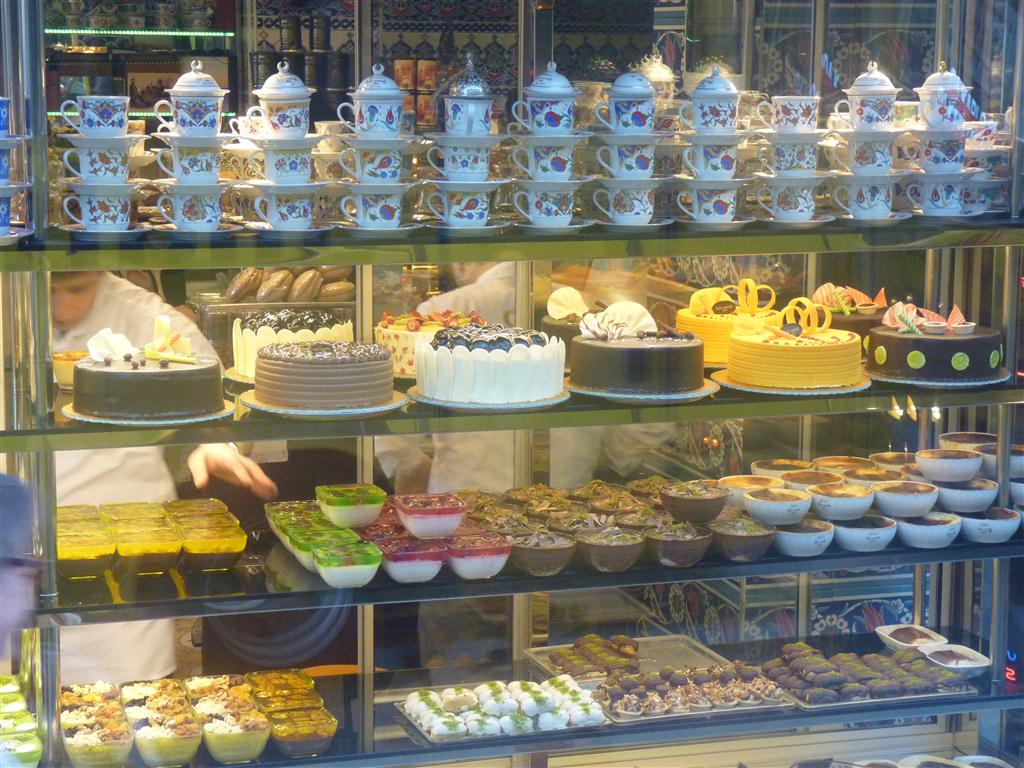
Large family-sized cakes are more likely to be a planned purchase, while the individual portions are much more likely to be an unplanned purchase.

2013 research carried out by Nielsen International suggests that about 72 percent of FMCG purchases are planned, but that 28 percent of supermarket purchases are unplanned or impulse purchases. The top unplanned purchases in the food category are candy (lollies), chocolate, cookies (biscuits), frozen desserts, and snacks and the top unplanned purchases in the non-food category are cosmetics, air-fresheners, toothbrushes, hand-soaps, and hand/body lotions. This explains why supermarkets place these types of products at the front of the store or near the checkout where the consumer spends more time and is more likely to notice them and therefore more likely to pop them into the shopping basket. Retailers use insights from this type of research to design stores in ways that maximise opportunities for impulse-buying.

A study suggests that subtle tactile cues—such as mobile phone vibrations—may reinforce impulse buying behavior in digital shopping environments. These haptic signals function as secondary reinforcers, potentially increasing the likelihood of spontaneous purchases and contributing to the formation of purchasing habits over time.

=== Affect: Emotions, feelings and mood ===
The consumer's affective state has implications for a number of different dimensions of consumer behaviour, including information search, evaluation of alternatives, product choice, service encounters, complaining, and advertising responses. Westbrook (1987, p. 259) defines affect as a "class of mental phenomena uniquely characterised by a consciously experienced, subjective feeling state, commonly accompanying emotions and moods." Research suggests that affect plays an important role in underlying attitudes, as well as shaping evaluation and decision-making.

Consumer researchers have noted the difficulties separating the concepts of affect, emotions, feelings, and mood. The line between emotions and mood is difficult to draw and consumer researchers often use the concepts interchangeably. Yet other researchers note that a detailed understanding of the relationship between affect and consumer behaviour has been hampered by the lack of research in the area. Indeed, within the consumer behaviour literature, there is widespread agreement that the role of emotions is an area that is currently under-researched and is in need of greater attention, both theoretically and empirically.

==== Information search ====
Studies have found that people in a positive mood are more efficient at information search activities. That, is they are more efficient at processing information, are able to integrate information by identifying useful relationships and arrive at creative solutions to problems. Due to their efficiency processing information, those who are in a positive mood are generally quicker to make decisions and easier to please. Research consistently shows that people in a positive mood are more likely to evaluate information positively. As online environments become more important as a consumer search tool, it may be prudent for web designers to consider site-design issues such as ease of navigation, lest poor design contribute to customer frustration thereby engendering a bad mood and ultimately leading to unfavourable product/brand evaluations.

==== Choice ====
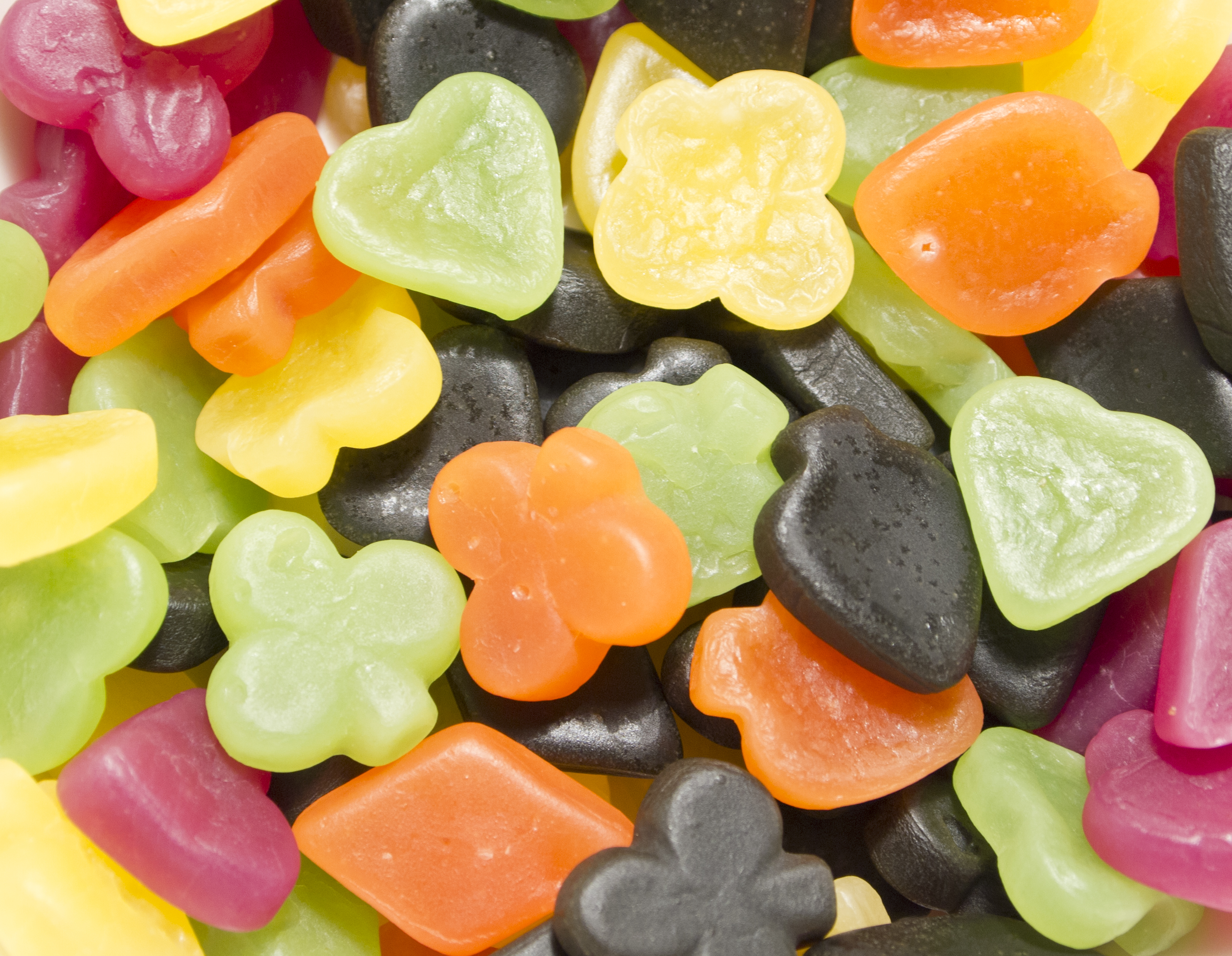
The immediate pleasure of eating candy often outweighs the longer term benefit of a healthier food choice.

Affect may play an important role in impulse-buying decisions. Research suggests that consumers place higher weightings on immediate affective rewards and punishments, while delayed rewards receive less weighting. For instance, the immediate pleasure of eating a sweet treat often outweighs the longer term benefits of eating a healthy alternative such as fruit. This occurs because the immediate emotional gain is a strong driver, and one that consumers can readily visualise whereas the more distant goal lacks sufficient strength to drive choice.

==== Customer experience ====
Customers who are in a bad mood are more difficult to please. They are slower to process information and consequently take longer to make decisions. They tend to be more argumentative and are more likely to complain.

==== Customer satisfaction ====
The relationship between affect and customer satisfaction is an area that has received considerable academic attention, especially in the services marketing literature. The proposition that there is a positive relationship between affect and satisfaction is well supported in the literature. In a meta-analysis of the empirical evidence, carried out in 2001, Szymanski et al., suggest that affect may be both an antecedent to and an outcome of satisfaction. Emotions elicited during consumption are proposed to leave affective traces in memory that are available for consumers to access and integrate into their satisfaction assessments.

A 2011 meta-analysis illustrates how both repurchase intent and loyalty enjoy a strong positive relationship (0.54) with customer satisfaction. Another meta-analysis finds that "The results indicate that both cognitive-related variables (including brand awareness, brand personality, and brand identity) and hedonic-related variables (including hedonic attitude, entertainment, and aesthetic appeal) have significant impacts on quality and value perceptions towards the brand (including perceived quality, reputation, brand image, perceived value, commitment, and trust). In addition, these variables are all significant predictors of brand loyalty."

A third meta-analysis, from 2013 elaborates on the concept of brand personality (bp): "First, the key drivers of BP are communication with hedonic benefit claims, branding activities, a brand's country-of-origin, and consumer personalities. Second, the study finds that the effects of BP are stronger for mature brands than for brands in the early life cycle stages. Third, sincerity and competence have the strongest influence on brand success variables (e.g., brand attitude, image, commitment, purchase intention), while excitement and ruggedness have the weakest influence on brand attitude and brand commitment."

==== Advertising ====
Emotion can play an important role in advertising. In advertising, two different approaches to persuasion are common: (a) thinking ads that require cognitive processing (also known as the central route to persuasion) and, (b) feeling ads that are processed at an emotional level (also known as the peripheral route). Advertisers can bypass cognitive, rational processing which can lead to counter-arguing by simply appealing to the emotions. Neuro-imaging studies suggest that when evaluating brands, consumers primarily use emotions (personal feelings and experiences) rather than information (brand attributes, features, and facts).

It is relatively widely accepted that emotional responses require fewer processing resources (i.e. are easier) and also result in more enduring associations with the brand being advertised. Feelings elicited by the advertising message can shape attitudes towards the brand and to the advertisement.

=== Customer loyalty ===
Customer loyalty, defined as "the relationship between an individual's relative attitude and repeat patronage" (Dick and Basu, 1994: p. 99). Thus, by definition, loyalty has both an attitudinal component and a behavioural component. Dick and Basu proposed four types of loyalty based on relative attitude and patronage behaviour:

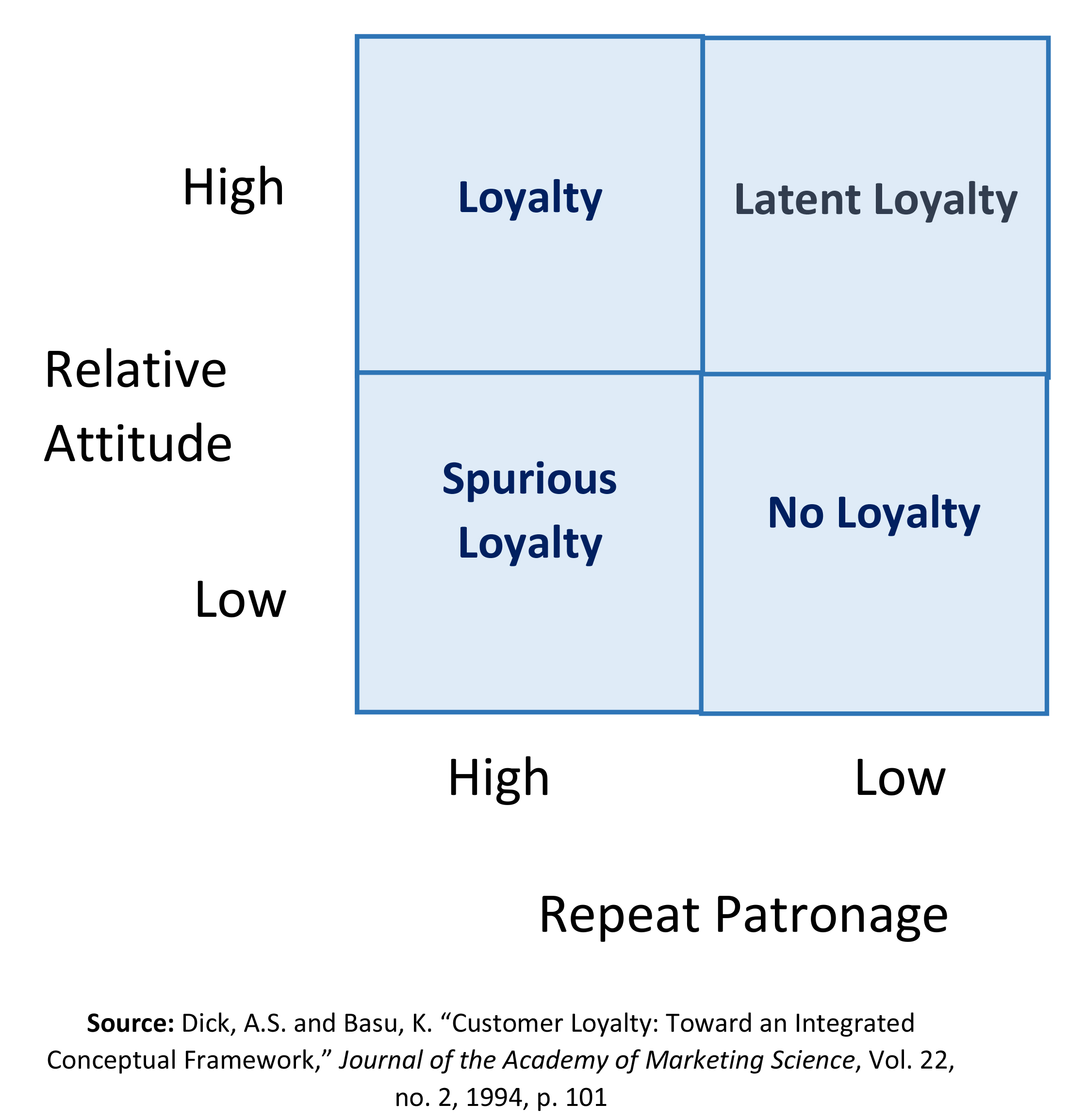
Dick and Basu's Loyalty Matrix

No Loyalty
Characterised by low relative attitude and low repeat patronage behaviour. May occur when competing brands are seen as similar or in the case of new brands (or categories) where insufficient time has elapsed for loyalty to become established.
Spurious Loyalty
Characterised by low relative attitude and high repeat patronage. Spurious loyalty occurs when the consumer undertakes repeat purchasing due to situational factors such as access, convenience. or shelf placement. Spurious loyalty can also occur when there are no genuine alternatives or the consumer is 'locked-in' to purchasing a given brand due to some quasi-contractual arrangement or membership status which creates difficulties for switching. In other words, where switching costs are relatively high, high patronage behaviour may be observed despite the absence of a favourable attitude towards the brand. An example would be a consumer who always purchases petrol from the same outlet on the way to work because there are no other outlets in the vicinity.
Latent Loyalty
Characterised by high relative attitude and low repeat patronage. Latent loyalty occurs when situational factors over-ride strong favourable attitudes. For example, a person may have a preferred restaurant but may not patronise it due to the preferences of dining companions.
Loyalty
(i.e. true loyalty) Characterised by favourable attitude and favourable patronage behaviour. For marketers, true loyalty is the ideal situation.

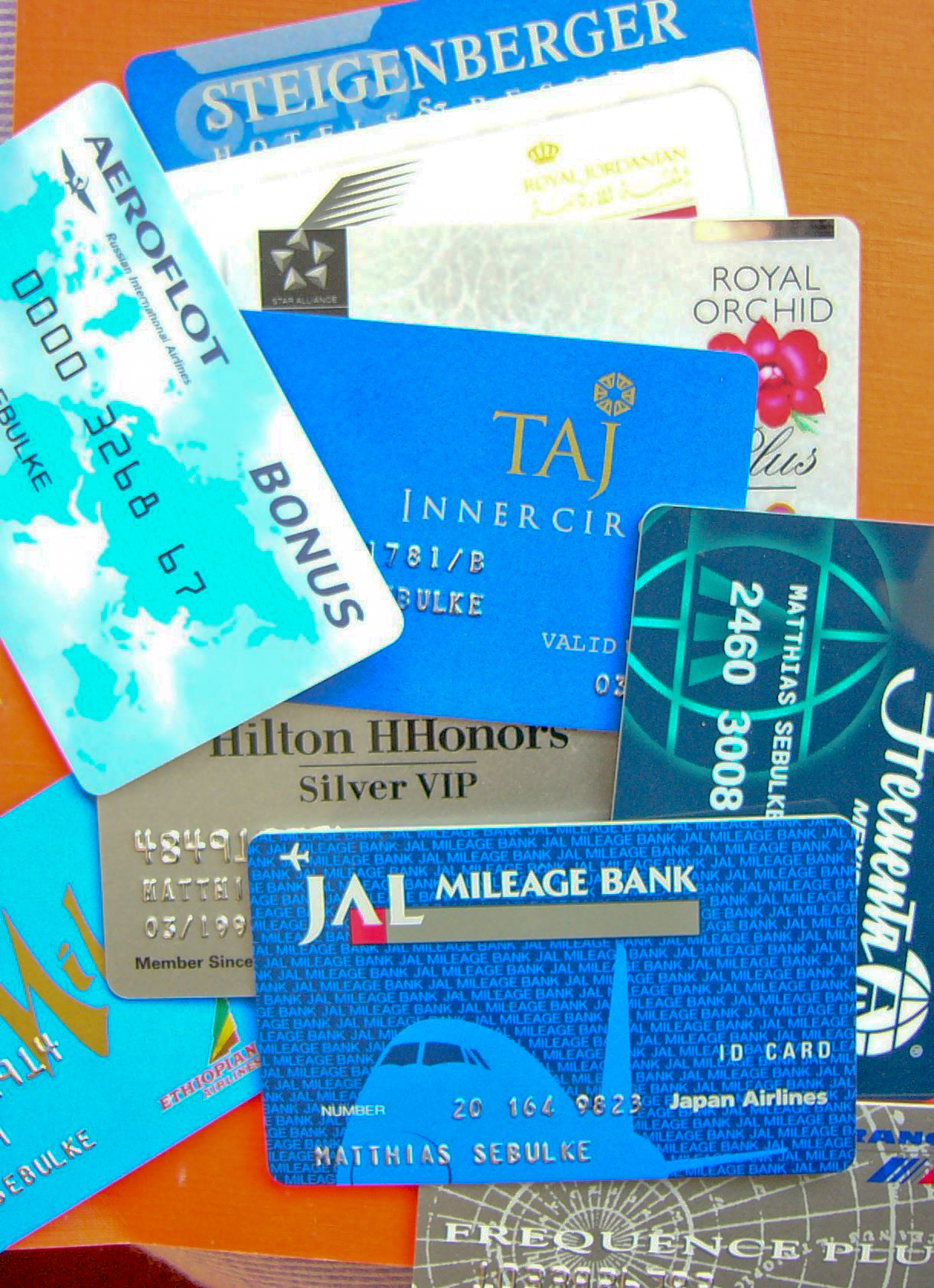
Frequent flyer schemes are among the most well known of the reward programs.

Loyalty marketing programs are built on the insight that it costs 5-20 times more to acquire a new customer than to retain an existing customer. Marketers use a variety of loyalty programs to strengthen customer attitudes towards the brand (or service provider/retailer) in order to retain customers, minimise customer defections, and strengthen loyalty bonds with existing customers. Broadly there are two types of program: reward and recognition programs. In a Reward Program, the customer accumulates points for each purchase, and the points can subsequently be exchanged for goods or services. Recognition Programs operate on a quasi-membership basis where the consumer is issued with a card that upon presentation leads to various entitlements such as free upgrades, special privileges, or access to products/services that are not normally available to non- members, and that acknowledge the loyal customer's "VIP" status. For example, a hotel might recognise loyal patrons by providing a complimentary fruit bowl and bottle of champagne in the room on arrival. Whereas reward programs are motivated by the consumer's desire for material possessions, recognition programs are motivated by the consumer's need for esteem, recognition, and status. Many commercial loyalty programs are hybrid schemes, combining elements of both reward and recognition. In addition, not all reward programs are designed to encourage loyalty. Certain reward programs are designed to encourage other types of positive customer behaviour such as the provision of referrals or providing positive word-of-mouth (WOM) recommendations.

Loyalty marketing can involve the use of databases and sophisticated software to analyse and profile customer loyalty segments with a view to identifying the most desirable segments, setting goals for each segment, and ultimately attempting to increase the size of the loyal customer base.

=== Customer citizenship behaviour ===
Customer citizenship behaviour is the labor that customers do for brands out of loyalty. The services marketing literature identifies seven distinct types of citizenship behaviour: voice (when customers direct their complaint to the service provider in order to rectify and maintain the relationship), display of affiliation, policing (the observation of other customers to ensure their appropriate behaviour), flexibility, service improvement (providing ideas and suggestions for organisations), word-of-mouth referrals, and benevolent acts of service.

=== Internet consumer behaviour ===
Traditional models of consumer behaviour were developed by scholars such as Fishbein and Ajzen and Howard and Sheth in the 1960s and 70s. More recently, Shun and Yunjie have argued that online consumer behaviour is different to offline behaviour and as a consequence requires new theories or models. After COVID-19, online consumer behaviour seems more essential, because since COVID-19 began, there were about 31% more people started shopping online with 43% of all respondents compared to only 12% of respondents before COVID-19.

Research has identified two types of consumer value in purchasing, namely product value and shopping value. Product value is likely to be similar for both online and offline shoppers. However, the shopping experience will be substantially different for online shoppers. In an offline shopping environment, consumers derive satisfaction from being within the physical store environment or retail landscape (hedonic motivations). In the case of online purchasing, shoppers derive satisfaction from their ability to navigate a website and the convenience of online searching which allows them to compare prices and 'shop around' with minimal time commitment. Thus the online consumer is motivated by more utilitarian factors.

==== Different types of online behaviour ====
Consumers may use online platforms for various stages of the purchase decision. Some consumers use online sources simply to acquire information about planned purchases. Others use online platforms for making the actual purchase. In other situations, consumers may also use online platforms to engage in post-purchase behaviours, such as staying connected with a brand by joining a brand community. Or they may become a brand advocate by posting a product review online, or providing brand referrals via social media. Some e-commerce providers have encountered a challenge in courting consumers who seek information online, but still prefer to turn to bricks and mortar retailers for their purchase. To understand the needs and habits of these and other kinds of online shoppers, online marketers have segmented consumers into different kinds of online behaviour in accordance with their online behavioural characteristics. Lewis and Lewis (1997) identified five market segments based on the way that consumers use the Internet in the purchase decision process:

1. "Directed Information-seekers" are users that primarily look for information about a product or service online, but there is no guarantee that they may be converted into online buyers.
2. "Undirected Information-seekers" are newcomers to a product or service. They are more likely to interact with online prompts, and click through to web pages linked in advertising.
3. "Directed Buyers" have a predetermined mindset and wish to purchase a specific product or service online.
4. "Bargain Hunters" are price-sensitive users that like to discover products during sales promotions. For these users, discounts are a major attraction to online sales conversion.
5. "Entertainment Seekers" are online consumers that are attracted to marketing delivered as a fun activity. Interactive online games could be useful in attracting this kind of customer.

==== A typology of online consumer behaviour ====
Wendy Moe (2003) argues that in the offline environment, consumers who are shopping in stores can be easily classified by experienced sales employees only by watching their shopping behaviours. Such classification may not appear online, but Moe and Fader argued that it is feasible to predict practical buying, surfing, and searching action online by investigating click patterns and repetition of visit within online behaviour. In addition, a report of E-consultancy about "benchmarking of user experience" outlined three kinds of online consuming behaviour as a valuable classification for the research of design of web pages to better serve different kinds of consuming behaviour. The three categories are: "trackers", "hunters", and "explorers".

1. "Trackers" are the online consumers who are exactly looking for a product that they definitely wish to buy. They use the Internet for the information about its price, delivery methods, post-purchase service, and so on. Once they have found the proper information, little effort is needed to let them do the business.
2. "Hunters" just know the categories of the product that they need, for instance, a novel for leisure time. However, they have not made specific decision on whose novel to buy. They use the Internet to find a list of product of their needed categories to make comparison. This kind of online consumer needs advice and help to do their business.
3. "Explorers" do not even have the categories of product on their minds. In fact, they just want to buy something online. There is more uncertainty of this type of online consumers.

==== Influence of the Internet on buying process ====
Table Internet's impact on buying process
Stage in buying process	1 Unaware	2 Aware of product need develop specification	3 Supplier search	4 Evaluate and select	5 Purchase	6 Post-purchase evaluation and feedback
Communications objectives	Generate awareness	Position features, benefit and brand	Lead generation (from range of customers)	Assist purchase decision	Facilitate purchase	Support use and retain business
Internet marketing techniques	Banner advertising, PR, links	Web site content (plus search support)	Search engines, intermediates	Web site content intermediates	Web site content	Personalised web site content and interaction

As the preceding table shows, the first row indicates the process of a consumer buying a new product, while the second and third row illustrates the positive influences the Internet could have on buying process by creating effective communications with online consumers. For example, suppose a consumer carelessly sees an advertisement about laptops on Wechat, a popular Chinese social media developed by Tencent. He begins to feel that his laptop is a bit out of date and wants to buy a new one, which is the outcome of good advertisement placed on a daily Internet tool. He does not know anything about how to buy a new one as business changes so fast today, so he searches on Google to find an answer. On the results page he finds promotional ads which mainly come from JD.com and Taobao, two competing Chinese online retailers in this field. He prefers to use JD.com, which provides detailed comparisons of brands, prices, locations, and methods of payment and delivery. After careful selection, he makes his order through JD.com via Wechat payment. JD.com has one of the fastest distribution channels within China and it supports excellent post-purchase service to maintain its position in the market.

=== The role of aesthetics and visual fluency in relation to consumer choice ===
Consumers decide whether or not they like a product within 90 seconds of viewing it for the first time. Therefore, having an aesthetically pleasing product is essential in the marketplace. Studies in processing fluency and consumer behaviour have revealed that "that people prefer visual displays that are easier to process and understand." and "When a product matches the user's associations with it it is perceived as more attractive." Visually fluent products draw upon consumer's pre-existing associations with their design elements, leading to a sense of familiarity and understanding with the product at hand. Visual cues such as colour, composition, typography, and imagery are associated with the phenomenon of fluency.

==== Colour ====
No Name Brand is associated with economy and affordability. Because of yellow's associations with cheapness, this brand's logo is processed fluently and easily by consumers.

Research in colour psychology has shown 62-90% of consumer product assessment is based on colour alone. Indeed, colours have been shown to be linked to consumer's perceptions on a product's quality, reliability, and value. The colours blue and black are viewed as being more reliable, valuable, and expensive while yellow, orange, and brown are associated with cheapness and low quality. Therefore, a product intended to be perceived as "high quality" with a predominately orange and brown palette would lack visual fluency and would likely fail to elicit a positive response with consumers. However, this can be advantageous if the consumer is already in the market for an item that is known to be inexpensive, in which case the use of yellow, orange, or brown would be appropriate. Colour can also be used to signal brand personality.

==== Composition ====
Composition is another visual tool that has the ability to affect information processing and influence in consumer perceptions. Studies have shown that consumers in western countries will associate products that are right aligned or placed on the right side of a display to be higher quality. Humans also have a center bias, which makes products that are centered or symmetrical in composition or display seem intrinsically more pleasing. Products that are centered in composition or have centered elements are perceived as being more attractive, popular, and important than products that are left aligned or right aligned. When an object is centered compositionally, it easier for a viewer to interpret and understand. It becomes more "fluent" and is therefore viewed as being more aesthetically pleasing.

==== Imagery ====
Evidence has shown that pictorial imagery correlates to higher instances of consumer recall and recognition. Pictorial imagery is also easier to process and gains consumer's attention faster. There is significant evidence that when consumers are presented with multiple choices, they will view objects more positively and more aesthetically pleasing when surrounded by congruent imagery. After repeated exposure, this familiar imagery becomes incorporated into consumer's visual lexicon and they become "fluent" in it. Images with higher levels of visual fluency perceived as being more familiar, likeable, and friendly and are therefore more likely to be chosen by consumers.

==== Typographic elements ====
Although studies have shown that of pictorial imagery is easier for consumers to process and understand, the choice of typography remains an indispensable element of product design. Handwritten and scripted fonts are associated with individuality, femininity, and luxury while sans serif fonts embody energy, cleanliness, and modernity. Font size has also been shown to have a direct correlation on the emotional attributes assigned to a product. One study has shown that larger type size and weight is perceived as more intimidating and authoritative. Although imagery reigns supreme in product design, type is processed just as easily as pictorial information when the consumer is already familiar with the product.

=== Environmental impact ===
An aspect of Individual action on climate change is consumer behaviour that affects how much and what kinds of materials are used to produce goods and food, how much material is recycled or composted, how much ends up as pollution, how much ends up in landfills, where goods are produced, how far they travel, and the carbon footprint of manufacturing, transportation, and disposal. Green marketing targets consumers who take the environmental impact of their purchases into account. Household waste sorting behavior also plays a role in the environmental impact of consumption. Correct separation of recyclable materials can increase recycling efficiency and reduce the amount of waste sent to landfills or incineration. Field research has shown that household waste sorting behavior is influenced by factors such as information, infrastructure, and individual motivation.

There are psychological factors which contribute to a consumer's perception surrounding their personal contributions to climate change inducing actions. One of the more well studied biases is referred to as the "better-than-average", or self-enhancing bias. This bias depicts an individual's tendency to perceive that their actions are superior, especially when compared to peers or demographically similar consumers. It has been found that this cognitive bias is indeed present when considering how consumers perceive their pro-environmental efforts. This may be a result of information about climate change leading to feelings of guilt and concern, which activates an unconscious thought process (denial, the better-than-average effect, and other cognitive reactions) that leads to a reduced perception of the threat of climate change. It is a mental defense mechanism that ultimately leads to a reduction in perceived individual responsibility to take part in green behaviours and one-planet-living.

== Research methods used ==
To gain insights into consumer behaviour, researchers uses the standard battery of market research methods such as surveys, depth interviews, and focus groups. Increasingly, researchers are turning to newer methodologies and technologies in an effort to seek deeper understandings of why consumers behave in certain ways. These newer methods include ethnographic research (also known as participant observation) and neuroscience as well as experimental lab designs. In addition, researchers often turn to separate disciplines for insights with potential to inform the study of consumer behaviour. For instance, behavioural economics is adding new insights into certain aspects of consumer behaviour.

=== Ethnographic research ===
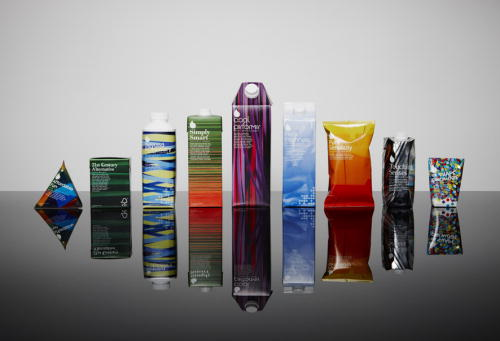
Product usage studies are used to improve packaging design.

Ethnographic research or ethnography has its origins in anthropology. However, marketers use ethnographic research to study the consumer in terms of cultural trends, lifestyle factors, attitudes and the way that social context influences product selection, consumption, and usage. Ethnographic research, also called participant observation, attempts to study consumer behaviour in natural settings rather than in artificial environment such as labs. Different types of ethnographic research are used in marketing including;

- Observed product usage: observing regular product usage at home or work, to gain insights into how products are opened, prepared, consumed, stored, disposed etc. to gain insights into the usefulness of packaging, labelling and general usage
- Day-in-the-life studies: extended visits during product usage situations to gain insights into norms and consumer expectations
- Accompanied purchase or shop-alongs: researcher accompanies a shopper on a purchase expedition to gain insights into consumer responses to merchandising and other sales tactics
- Cultural studies: similar to traditional ethnography; extended stays with a group or tribe with a view to uncovering the fundamental rules and conventions that govern behaviour
- Guerilla ethnography: random observations in public settings to help establish research questions or to gain quick insights into specific behaviours
- Mystery shopping: observations in the retail context with a view to gaining insights into the customer's service experience
- Multiple methodologies: combining ethnographic research methods with conventional research techniques with a view to triangulating results

Trendspotters such as Faith Popcorn's BrainReserve make extensive use of ethnographic research to spot emergent trends.

=== Consumer neuroscience ===
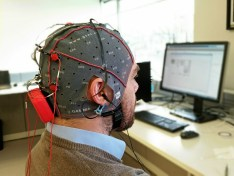
Neuromarketing uses sophisticated biometric sensors such as EEG to study consumer responses to specific stimuli.

Consumer neuroscience (also known as neuromarketing) refers to the commercial use of neuroscience when applied to the investigation of marketing problems and consumer research. Some researchers have argued that the term consumer neuroscience is preferred over neuromarketing or other alternatives.

Consumer neuroscience employs sophisticated bio-metric sensors, such as electroencephalography (EEG), functional magnetic resonance imaging (fMRI) and eye tracking, to study the ways that consumers respond to specific stimuli such as product displays, brands, packaging information, or other marketing signals. Such tests reveal stimuli that trigger the brain's pleasure centre.

Consumer neuroscience has become a mainstream component of consumer research methods. International market research company Nielsen Research has recently added neuromarketing to its services by acquiring Innerscope, a company specialising in neuromarketing research thus enabling Nielsen to add neuromarketing research to the suite of services available to clients.

Consumer neuroscience research has led to some surprising findings:

Framing price or value
For example, one study reported on a magazine subscription where potential subscribers were offered two options: an online subscription for $59, or a combined online and print for $129 a year. Most people chose the online only option. However, when a third option was introduced: print only for $129 (i.e. the decoy), the online and print option seemed like better value and a significant number of people switched to that option. In other words, the decoy price assists in framing value. Marketers use a variety of methods to frame value: e.g. quote monthly payment options rather than a single all-inclusive price.
Choice fatigue
Research by Sheena Iyengar experimented with the number of gourmet jams on display. When consumers were faced with a large number of alternatives (24 jams), 60% of consumers stopped and looked but only a few (3%) actually made a purchase. However, when consumers faced with fewer brands (6 jams), were more likely to make a purchase with 30% going on to buy something. Similar results have been observed in other categories. The findings suggest that while consumers appreciate being given some choice, the process of making a selection is painful and can lead to choice fatigue. An issue for marketers and retailers is to determine the 'sweet spot' where consumers are given sufficient choice to satisfy their desire for variety, but not become overwhelmed by it.
Decision paralysis
One study examined the wording used to solicit philanthropic donations. Consumers were exposed to variants in the advertising copy execution: "Would you be willing to help by giving a donation?" and "Would you be willing to help by giving a donation? Every penny will help." Those given the second option were almost twice as likely to donate. The researchers concluded that people are more likely to take action when given parameters. By clarifying that "even a penny" could make a difference, the second line provides guidance and makes the request more achievable. For marketers, the implication is that when asking consumers to take an action, specifying a small step helps to break through the action paralysis. This finding also suggests that even small differences in advertising copy can lead to improved outcomes. Action instructions will make the advertisement more purposeful.

== See also ==
- Consumer affinity
- Consumer animosity
- Advertising management - explains how consumer behaviours concepts are used to develop advertising strategies
- Advertising research - provides background on how consumer behaviour concepts inform research methods used in understanding advertising effectiveness
- Attitude-toward-the-ad models
- Brand awareness - detailed explanation of brand awareness
- Brand management - explains how consumer behaviour concepts are used to manage brand awareness and brand growth through the product-life cycle
- Buying Decision Process - offers an alternative explanation to the consumer buying decision process
- Consumer culture theory - offers a cultural approach to consumer behavior
- Consumer socialisation
- Consumer confusion
- Food and Brand Lab
- Marketing research - provides background on how consumer behaviour concepts inform the research methods used in marketing, consumer behaviour, brand awareness and advertising management
- Predictive buying
- Product life-cycle management (marketing) - detailed explanation of how consumer awareness changes over the product's life-cycle, and how this calls for different strategies at each stage
- Superstition#Consumer behavior
- Window shopping
