= Presidential Council on Nation Branding =

- 국가브랜드위원회

Agency overview
- Formed: January 22, 2009
- Dissolved: March 23, 2013
- Headquarters: Seoul, South Korea
- Agency executive: Lee Bae-yong, Chairperson
- Website: Official English Site

Korean name
- Hangul: 국가브랜드위원회
- Hanja: 國家브랜드委員會
- RR: Gukga beuraendeu wiwonhoe
- MR: Kukka pŭraendŭ wiwŏnhoe

The Presidential Council on Nation Branding was established on January 22, 2009, by Executive Decree 21283 with the objective to develop South Korea's national brand value. The council was abolished on March 23, 2013.

South Korea achieved a nation brand above the OECD average. South Korea's nation brand ranked 17th in 2012, on track to achieving the council's goal of 15th place by 2013.

== Background and objective ==
According to the Simon Anholt Report, nation branding refers to "how a country is seen by others". Other conceptualizations define nation branding as "strategic self-presentation of a country with the aim of creating reputational capital through economic, political, and social interest promotion at home and abroad." National brand today reflects the image of a country (soft power) more than its military or economic influence (hard power) in the international world. Strong national brand translates into high respect and acceptance of that country by the international community. To assess Korea’s current positioning and seek ways to improve and strengthen national brand in and out of Korea, governmental efforts continue.

The goal of the Presidential Council on Nation Branding was to raise Korea's brand from near the bottom of the member states of the OECD to the middle of the bloc (13 out of 31 countries) by 2013.

== Status of Korean national brand ==
Mainly positive view of South Korea (2013 BBC Poll); % change 2010
| Indonesia | 58% | ▲15% |
| Ghana | 55% | ▲14% |
| Nigeria | 48% | ▲17% |
| United States | 47% | ▲1% |
| Australia | 45% | ▲10% |
| China | 44% | ▼14% |
| Spain | 43% | ▲21% |
| United Kingdom | 41% | ▲12% |
| Chile | 40% | ▼5% |
| Central America (2010) | 39% | NR |
| Canada | 38% | ▲1% |
| France | 37% | ▲7% |
| Kenya | 34% | ▲3% |
| Russia | 34% | ▲6% |
| Peru | 31% | NA |
| Poland | 31% | NA |
| Brazil | 30% | ▼8% |
| Turkey | 30% | ▲13% |
| Pakistan | 29% | ▲16% |
| Mexico | 24% | ▼16% |
| Italy (2010) | 23% | NR |
| Azerbaijan (2010) | 20% | NR |
| Egypt | 20% | ▲7% |
| Greece | 18% | NA |
| Germany | 17% | ▼11% |
| India | 19% | Steady |
| Japan | 19% | ▼17% |
| NA = Data not available in 2010; NR = Country not ranked in 2013 | | |

South Korea made substantial gains since the launch of the council, moving up to 26th in 2011 in the Anholt-GfK Roper Nation Brands Index from a rank of 29th in 2010 and 32nd in 2008. The index has not published results for South Korea since 2012.

In a similar nation brand index that the Presidential Council on Nation Branding developed with Samsung Economic Research Institute, South Korea moved up to 17th in 2012 from 19th in 2010 and 20th in 2009. Backed by the world's most watched YouTube video in history, Gangnam Style and hit products from Samsung, the world's largest information technology company, for the first time, the country surpassed the average of the OECD in 2012, overtaking countries like Spain, Finland and Ireland, while trending toward surpassing New Zealand, Norway, and Italy within a decade.

== Vision and strategy ==
The general motto employed by the South Korean government was, "Korea, A Loving Embrace"

=== Vision ===
As its main goal, the Presidential Council on Nation Branding aimed to (1) achieve a national brand at the OECD average level and (2) achieve the entry of the Korean national brand as world top 15 by 2013.

=== Strategy ===
Strategies to implement the aforementioned goals included, (1) accumulating national capacity through cooperation amongst the people, corporations, and government, (2) managing national brand by establishing a master plan and developing brand index, (3) pursuing customized policies in accordance to the needs of different sectors, and (4) creating a national brand motivating force through the expansion of a common national response.

The Presidential Council on Nation Branding emphasized on the following five strategic areas to increase national brand value: (1) Contribution to the international community, (2) embrace of multiculturalism and consideration for foreigners, (3) cultivation of global citizenship, (4) advertisement of modern technology and products, and (5) promotion of an attractive culture and tourism.

== Functions ==
The three main functions of the Presidential Council on Nation Branding were: (1) General control tower on nation branding related issues of the South Korean government, (2) Effective execution of nation branding policies and related projects, and (3) Strengthening and expanding public-private partnerships as well as encouraging the participation of Korean nationals in nation branding activities.

== Structure ==
The council was led by its second chairperson, Lee Bae-yong from September 28, 2010. She was the President of Ewha Womans University. The first was Yoon-Dae Euh who had to leave the post after becoming the Chairman of KB Financial Group Inc. in June 2010. The former Chairperson Euh was former President of Korea University (2003~2006), Vice Chair of the National Economic Advisory Council, Chairman of advisory board of the Ministry of Education and Human Resources, Policy Advisor for Foreign Affairs and Trade (1993~2004).

Under the chairperson, the Head of the Secretariat planned and carried out the activities of the council, which were supported by five teams including teams specializing in international cooperation, corporate and information technology, culture and tourism, the global community and overall coordination. A 19-member working-level body assisted the panel.

The council consisted of 47 members (34 appointed members and 13 ex officio members) as well as an international advisory forum of 34 members. The 34 appointed members were experts and CEOs of some of Korea’s corporate icons (Samsung, SK Group, Korean Air, and Hyundai). The secretariat of the council carried out administrative related tasks to support the activities of the council.

== Activities ==
There were ten main activities promoted by the Presidential Council on Nation Branding: (1) Shaping the Future with Korea, (2) Campus World: Global Korea Scholarship, Campus Asia, (3) Korean Supporters, (4) Global Korean Network, (5) Promoting Korean and Taekwondo, (6) Global Citizenship,(7) Advanced Technology & Design Korea, (8) Rainbow Korea, (9) Friendly Digital Korea, (10) Korea Brand Index.

(1) Shaping the Future with Korea

This project includes strategic economic cooperation with developing and underdeveloped countries by passing down the Korean development experience. The project aims in expanding the Economic Hallyu (or Korean movement) worldwide.

(2) Campus World : Global Korea Scholarship, Campus Asia

This project supports international students with scholarships to establish a group of scholars amicable to Korea. The project also promotes student exchange programs between Asian universities to promote mutual understanding and interaction amongst future leaders in the Asian region.

(3) Korean Supporters "World Friends Korea"

The government of Korea unified the government initiated international volunteer services under a new brand, World Friends Korea. The synergy increase is expected through strategic linkage between governmental agencies and departments. Korean Supporters aims at raising global outstanding individuals and national awareness through strengthening volunteer services capacity and enhancing national participation.
The program will dispatch over 3,000 volunteers overseas every year, the second largest after some 8,000 from the United States.
Korea’s foreign assistance policy is World Friends Korea, roughly equivalent to the U.S. Peace Corps. The Presidential Council on Nation Branding will play a coordinating role through its oversight of the various volunteer programs that government agencies have traditionally operated. Volunteers will be tasked with promoting Korea’s culture and food around the world as well as working in areas such as information technology, education, and the environment.

(4) Global Korean Network

This project aims in binding 7 million overseas Koreans into a single network. Capacity building of overseas Koreans and strengthening ties with their mother country, Korea may possibly bring in contributions to increasing brand value of Korea.

(5) Promoting the Korean language

This project includes establishing a Korean language e-learning system and increase knowledge of the Korean language through unifying Korean learning institutes as a single brand.
In October 2009, the Korean administration announced its plan to set up 150 Korean-language schools, called the King Sejong Institute, overseas by 2015 as part of efforts to promote cultural exchanges. The schools will play a central role in globalizing the Korean alphabet or Hangul, as well as providing information about the country.

(6) Promoting Taekwondo

This project aims in branding Taekwondo as a prestigious and internationally recognized sport. Through Taekwondo, the council wishes to introduce Korean culture and spiritual value and develop cultural contents and tourist products. The council will also assist in systemizing Taekwondo academies abroad.

(7) Global citizenship

This project is a hospitality campaign towards foreigners either living or visiting Korea. The project will assist Korean nationals in raising global etiquette and internet ethics.

(8) Advanced Technology & Design Korea:

This project includes positioning the best quality products made in Korea as “Premium Korea” and publicize Korean luxuries through these products.

(9) Rainbow Korea

This project aims in assisting multicultural families to become healthy members of the Korean society. Infrastructure and economic assistance toward multicultural families in Korea are to be provided through this project.

(10) Friendly Digital Korea

Friendly Digital Korea is a project utilizing broadcasting technology and infrastructure to enhance communication with the international world. Through this project, the council aims in creating an accessible image of Korea by the international community and communicate better with the international world through various contents.

(11) Korea Brand Index

Managing a general national brand index by developing indexes of brand related activities from each government agency.

== Advanced Technology and Design Korea ==
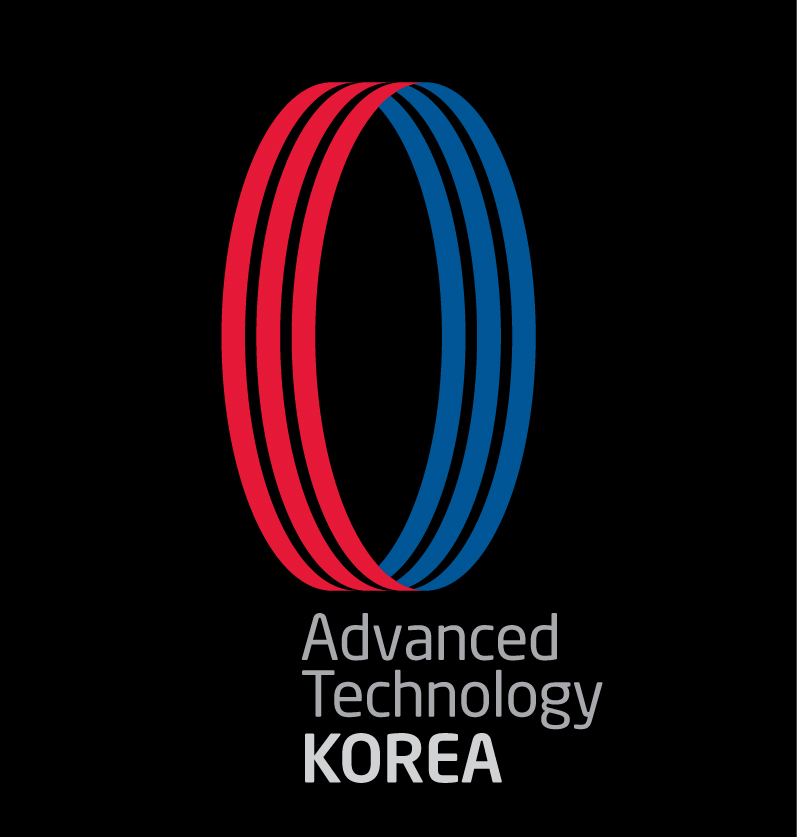
Advanced Technology and Design Korea

The project "Advanced Technology and Design Korea"--sponsored by KOTRA, the Presidential Council on Nation Branding, and the Ministry of Knowledge Economy--aimed itself to be the go to place in order to find information about Korea’s most innovative technology, design and business.

== Funding ==
The total amount of money spent annually on global branding by separate organizations is projected to reach 100 billion won ($74 million) mostly used to fund branding campaigns at home and abroad. The council itself had an annual budget of 8 billion won ($5.8 million)

== See also ==
- Korean wave
- Euh Yoon-dae
- World Friends Korea
- VANK
