= Wordmark =

Distinct text-only typographic

A wordmark or word mark is a text-only statement of the name of a product, service, company, organization, or institution that is used for purposes of identification and branding. A wordmark can be an actual word (e.g., Apple), a made-up term that reads like a word (e.g., iPhone), or an acronym, initialism, or series of letters (e.g., IBM). In some jurisdictions a wordmark may be trademarked, giving it legal distinction, and potentially additional protection of any artistic presentation.

== Comparison with logos ==
=== Companies ===
The Coca-Cola wordmark

The IBM logotype

The Louis Vuitton wordmark (Note: The use of Louis Vuitton's wordmark is regulated by company policy.)

Wordmark for Kilgore, Texas

=== Cities ===
Word marks can function effectively as identifiers for cities, similar to their use for brands and companies. A unique typographic representation of a city's name can help establish its identity and foster community pride. Such word marks can reflect a city's character, culture, and history, making it more recognizable to residents and visitors. They can be utilized in various contexts, such as on signage, promotional materials, or public spaces, contributing to a cohesive urban identity. Overall, word marks for cities provide a straightforward way to enhance visibility and create a sense of place without overtly promoting a specific agenda.

=== Countries ===
The Canada wordmark

Countries also employ wordmarks as a critical component of their nation branding strategies. These text‐based representations of a country's name are crafted to evoke specific perceptions and promote a unified national identity on the global stage.

For example, countries might deploy a distinct wordmark in tourism campaigns, official government communications, or international trade initiatives to differentiate themselves and convey attributes such as innovation, cultural richness, or stability.

The design of a country's wordmark—including its typeface treatment, letterspacing, and color palette—is carefully considered to resonate with target audiences and align with the nation's strategic objectives.

These wordmarks can be officially registered and protected—much like corporate trademarks—to prevent unauthorized use and maintain the integrity of the national brand.

== Trademarking ==
In many jurisdictions, such as the United States and European Union, a qualifying wordmark may be registered as a trademark, making it a protected intellectual property.

Unlike names and logos, trademarked wordmarks are generally not case-sensitive and are listed in uppercase by trademark registrars such as the United States Patent and Trademark Office, even if they are always cased in a certain way by the owner; this gives the trademark holder rights no matter how the wordmark is presented.

In the United States, the legal term "word mark" refers only to the text, not to any graphical representation.

== Copyrighting ==
In most cases, wordmarks cannot be copyrighted, as they do not reach the threshold of originality.

== See also ==
- Slogan
- Place Branding
- Logo
