= WFK =

WFK may refer to:

- World Friends Korea, a South Korean government-run overseas volunteer program
- WFK, the IATA code for Northern Aroostook Regional Airport, a public airport in Frenchville, Aroostook County, Maine, United States
- WFK, the Telegraph code for Weifang railway station, Shandong, China
