= Journal of Place Management and Development =

- Discipline: Place branding
- Language: English

Publication details
- History: 2008-present
- Publisher: Emerald Publishing
- Frequency: Quarterly

Standard abbreviations
- ISO 4: J. Place Manag. Dev.

Indexing
- ISSN: 1753-8335 (print); 1753-8343 (web)

Links
- Journal homepage

The Journal of Place Management and Development is a quarterly, peer-reviewed, academic journal covering place branding. It is published by Emerald Publishing and indexed by Scopus.
