= Wool Products Labeling Act =

1939 US consumer protection legislation

The Wool Products Labeling Act is a U.S. regulation enacted in 1939, which makes provisions for the accurate labeling of products containing wool fibers. The purpose of this act is to promote transparency and safeguard consumers and stakeholders in the wool industry from deceptive practices and false information regarding the composition of wool products in the market.

The law was also referred to as the "truth in fabrics law".

== Background ==
The 1914 Federal Trade Commission Act aimed to promote business reform, protect consumers from deceptive advertising, and ensure transparent and honest product information from businesses. The Federal Trade Commission (FTC) took notice of issues related to the advertising of wool products, including descriptive labels and visual materials.

In fall 1918, the commission lodged complaints against garment manufacturers falsely claiming their products were fully made of wool, when investigation revealed partial wool composition. One of these cases exemplifies the challenges consumers encounter when seeking to purchase an "all-wool" undergarment.

The FTC encountered numerous challenges in this regard. For instance, an undergarments manufacturer was accused of unfair competition for falsely labeling, advertising, and branding certain product lines as containing wool, despite the minimal wool content. This violation specifically contravened Section 5 of the Federal Trade Commission Act.

The FTC took action against false advertising by advancing the implementation of the Wool Products Labeling Act. It was enacted in 1939 and declares misbranding as unlawful.

== Scope ==
The Wool Products Labeling Act (WPL) came into force in 1939 and underwent revisions in 1980 and 1984. It sets the definitions of the terms "wool" and "recycled wool" for the labeling of products that contain wool fibers. The Wool Products Labeling Act takes precedence over the Textile Fiber Products Identification Act, as it specifically governs the labeling of wool products. The Textile Fiber Products Identification Act applies to the labeling of all textile fiber products other than wool.

=== Definitions ===
The Wool Products Labeling Act (WPL, 15 U.S.C. § 68) is consumer protection legislation that establishes clear guidelines for the labeling of products containing wool fibers. This act ensures that the labels accurately define the presence of wool and disclose the percentages of wool fibers in the product composition. By doing so, the law effectively safeguards consumers from misinformation, counterfeit alternatives, and blends that may misrepresent the actual content of wool in the product. The WPL plays a crucial role in promoting transparency and maintaining the integrity of wool-based products in the marketplace. For the purposes of the act, wool refers to the fiber obtained from sheep or lamb fleece, or Angora or Cashmere goat hair. It may also comprise specialty fibers from camel, alpaca, llama, and vicuna hair.

The WPL outlines the definitions of wool and recycled wool for the explicit purpose of labeling products that contain wool fibers, as follows:

==== Wool ====
Wool refers to the fiber obtained from the fleece of sheep or lambs, or the hair of Angora rabbits or Cashmere goats. It may also include specialty fibers from animals such as camels, alpacas, llamas, and vicuñas.

As per the legal definition, "wool" encompasses both new wool and wool fibers recovered from knit scraps, broken threads, and noil, which refers to the short fibers of wool removed during the process of making worsted yarns from wool.

==== Virgin wool ====
Virgin wool, according to the law, is wool that has not undergone any form of processing. Consequently, it is illegal to classify wool derived from knitting clippings or broken yarns as "virgin wool".

==== Recycled wool ====
The term "recycled wool" is defined as wool obtained from scraps, as well as from new woven or felted fabrics, which is then processed through garnetting or shredding to revert it to a fibrous state. Recycled wool is used in the manufacture of wool products.

== 2018 Edition ==
The Wool Products Labeling Act (US FTC Regulation) (2018 Edition) is an updated version that meets the requirements of the Wool Suit Fabric Labeling Fairness and International Standards Conforming Act, and that has been harmonized with amendments made to the Textile Fiber Products Identification Act.

== See also ==
- Sherman Antitrust Act
- United States antitrust law
- Country of origin
- International Wool Secretariat
- Woolmark
