= Camp David (fashion) =

German fashion label

- Industry: Fashion
- Founded: 1997; 29 years ago
- Founders: Jürgen Finkbeiner; Hans-Peter Finkbeiner; Thomas Finkbeiner
- Headquarters: Hoppegarten, Germany
- Products: Clothing; accessories
- Number of employees: 1,500 (as of 2014)
- Website: www.campdavid-soccx.de

Camp David (stylised in all caps) is a fashion label of Clinton Großhandels-GmbH founded in 1997 and headquartered in Hoppegarten, Brandenburg. The label produces men's clothing and manages retail stores. It focuses on leisurewear, but also offers suits, accessories, and shoes. Famous brand ambassadors include Dieter Bohlen, Arthur Abraham, and Marcus Schenkenberg.

== History ==
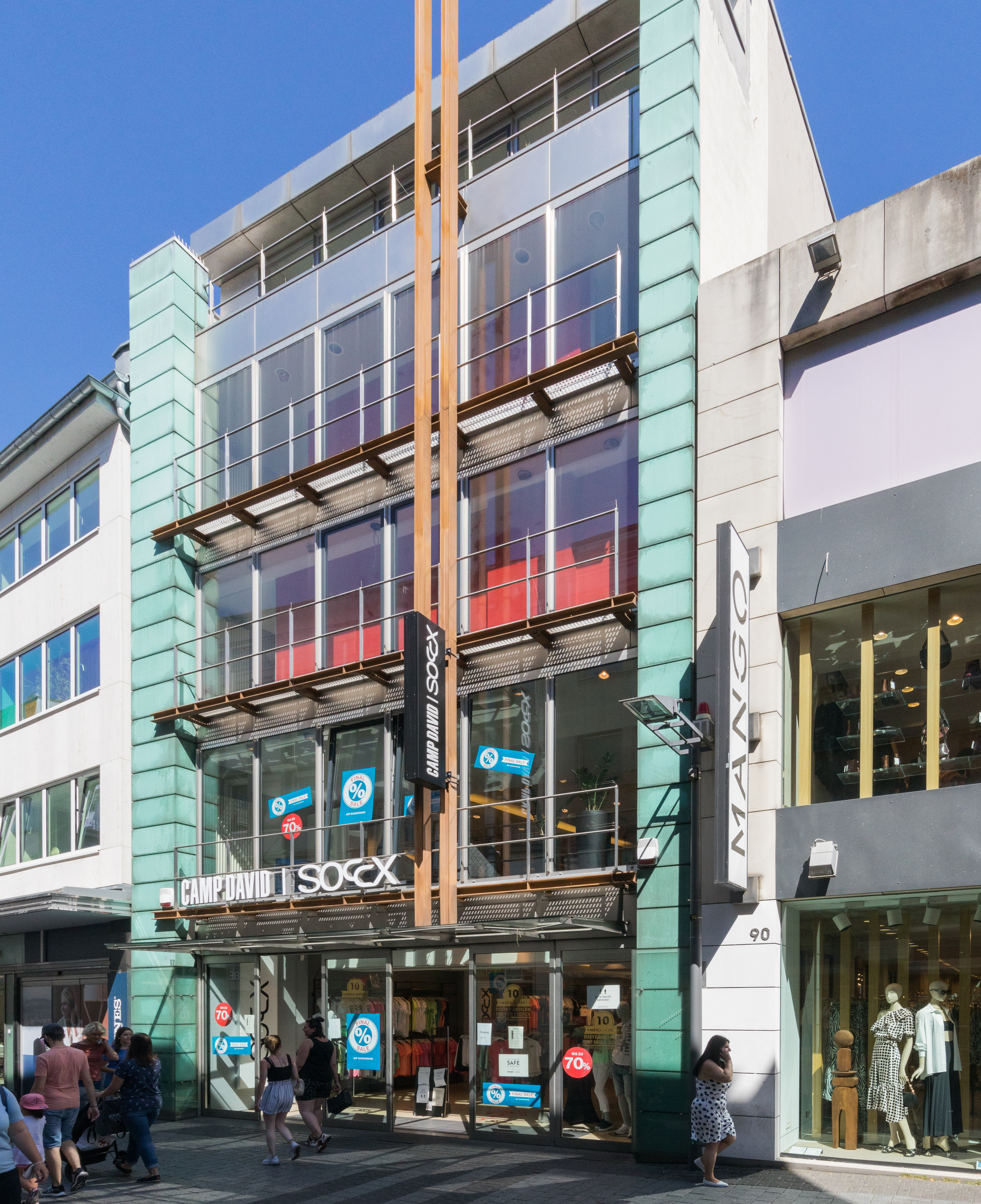
Camp David and Soccx store in the Hohe Straße of Cologne in 2020

The three brothers Jürgen, Hans-Peter, and Thomas Finkbeiner established the company Clinton in 1997, creating Camp David as a brand of leisurewear for men and Soccx as a label targeted towards women; eldest brother Achim joined the company later. The mother company Clinton was named after Bill Clinton, who was president of the United States when it was founded, while Camp David was chosen after the country retreat for the president. Soccx references Bill Clinton's pet cat Socks and Chelsea his daughter Chelsea Clinton. The names are considered a successful example of the country-of-origin effect. In 2000, the franchise system Chelsea was created for the establishment of clothing stores. In 2008, a concept for Camp David stores and one for Soccx was introduced in the same way in 2010.

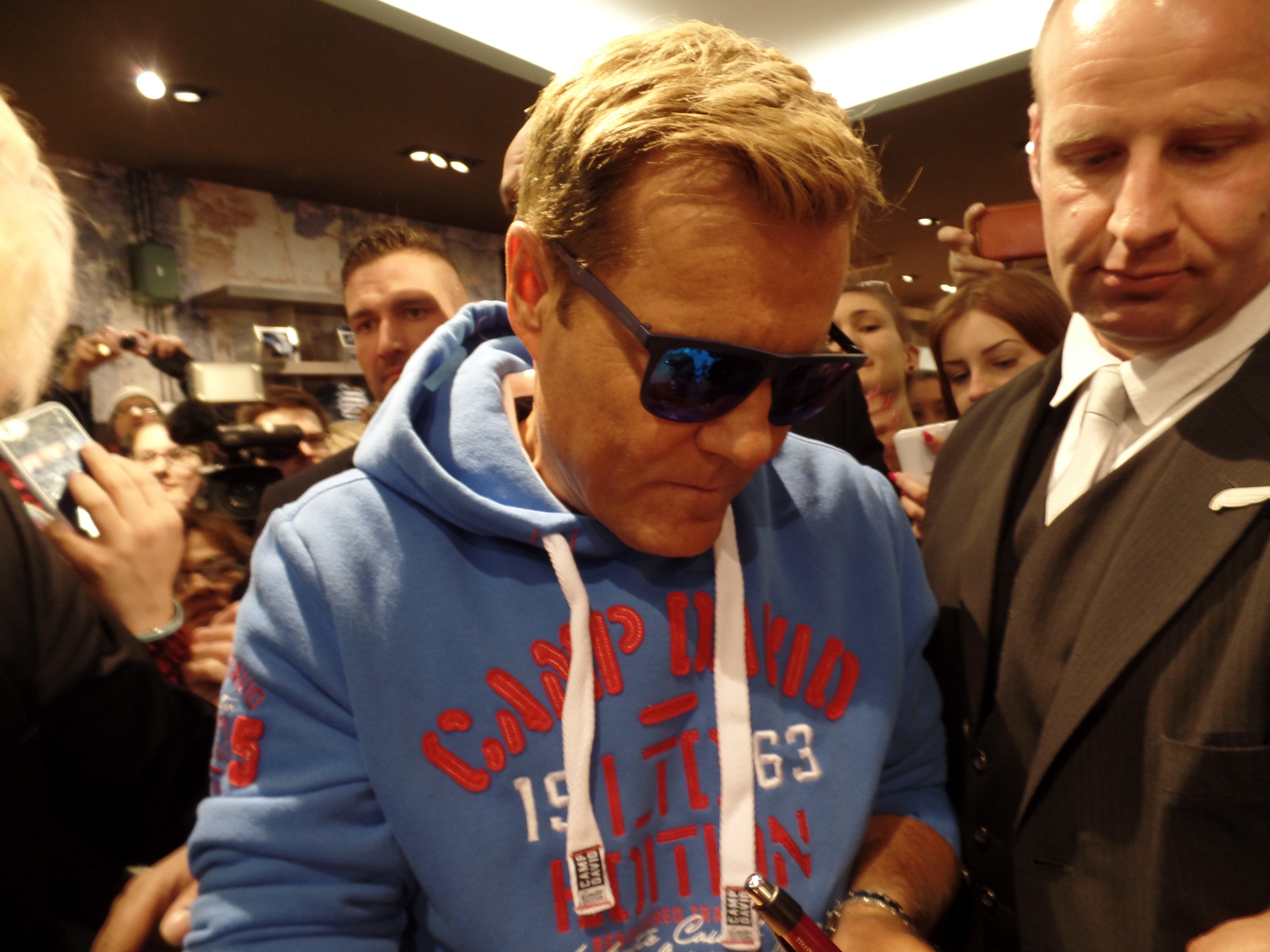
Brand ambassador Dieter Bohlen at the opening of a Camp David store in Oldenburg in 2016

Until 2010, the brand was only available in the new states of Germany. The expansion into the West only began following the hiring of Dieter Bohlen as a brand ambassador and the associated presence of the brand in the television programme Das Supertalent, the German version of the Got Talent franchise. In 2013, there were 230 stores and more than 1,000 selling areas in department store or boutiques of both Camp David and Soccx in Germany, Austria, and Switzerland. In 2014, according to data provided by the company, there were 250 stores and 1,500 selling areas.

Camp David maintained its operations in Russia despite the international sanctions imposed in response to the invasion of Ukraine in 2022 and still operates in Russia as of 2025, attracting criticism due to the ongoing war.
