= Destination image =

Beliefs and impressions tourists hold about a destination

Destination image is the set of beliefs, impressions and feelings that a person holds about a tourist destination. It is one of the most studied concepts in tourism research, on the argument that travellers choose between destinations on the basis of their mental representations of them rather than on the destinations' objective attributes.

== Conceptualisation ==
Destination image is commonly divided into a cognitive component, comprising beliefs about the destination's attributes, an affective component, comprising feelings toward it, and a conative component, corresponding to intended behaviour.

Echtner and Ritchie argued that these divisions are insufficient on their own and proposed that image be described along three continua: from discrete attributes to holistic impressions, from functional or directly observable characteristics to psychological or abstract ones, and from characteristics common to many destinations to features unique to one.

== Imagery and image ==
A further distinction separates destination imagery from destination image. Destination imagery refers to the full set of associations that a person holds about a destination, while destination image refers to the overall summary evaluation of it, which functions as a heuristic or mental shortcut when destinations are compared. Josiassen, Assaf, Woo and Kock argued that the two have frequently been conflated in the literature, with the consequence that measures developed for one construct are applied to the other, and proposed that they be delimited and measured separately.

Subsequent work has treated imagery as an object of study in its own right. A free-recall study of 23,446 responses compared the associations evoked by destinations respondents had visited and rated most highly with those evoked by destinations they had never visited but wished to, reported systematic structural differences between the two, and proposed a model of how destination imagery is processed in memory.

== Formation ==
Gartner described image formation as the outcome of a continuum of information agents, ranging from overt advertising by the destination, through covert forms such as apparently independent endorsements, to autonomous agents such as news reporting and popular culture, and organic sources such as friends, family and personal visitation. Agents differ in credibility and in the cost of reaching the traveller, and the least controllable are often the most persuasive.

Baloglu and McCleary modelled image formation as the joint product of stimulus factors, including information sources and previous experience of the destination, and personal factors, including the traveller's psychological and social characteristics. In their model these inputs produce separate perceptual or cognitive and affective evaluations, which together yield the overall image.

== Measurement ==
Two measurement traditions coexist. Structured approaches present respondents with a fixed set of attribute scales and are suited to comparison between destinations; unstructured approaches use open-ended questions and are better able to capture holistic and unique impressions. Echtner and Ritchie advocated combining the two, since neither captures the full construct alone. A review of 142 destination image studies published between 1973 and 2000 found that structured attribute scales dominated the literature and that unstructured methods remained comparatively rare.

More recently, Kock, Josiassen and Assaf proposed the destination content model, which draws on psychological theories of mental representation to distinguish the types of information that individuals hold about a destination, in place of treating destination image as a single undifferentiated evaluation.

== Applications ==
Because image is held to precede destination choice, it is a standard target of destination marketing, and image measurement is used to position a destination against competitors, to identify gaps between projected and perceived image, and to track the effect of events or crises on how a destination is seen.

== See also ==
- Destination marketing organization
- Tourist motivation
- Place branding
- Nation branding
