= Consumer ethnocentrism =

Psychological concept of consumer behaviour

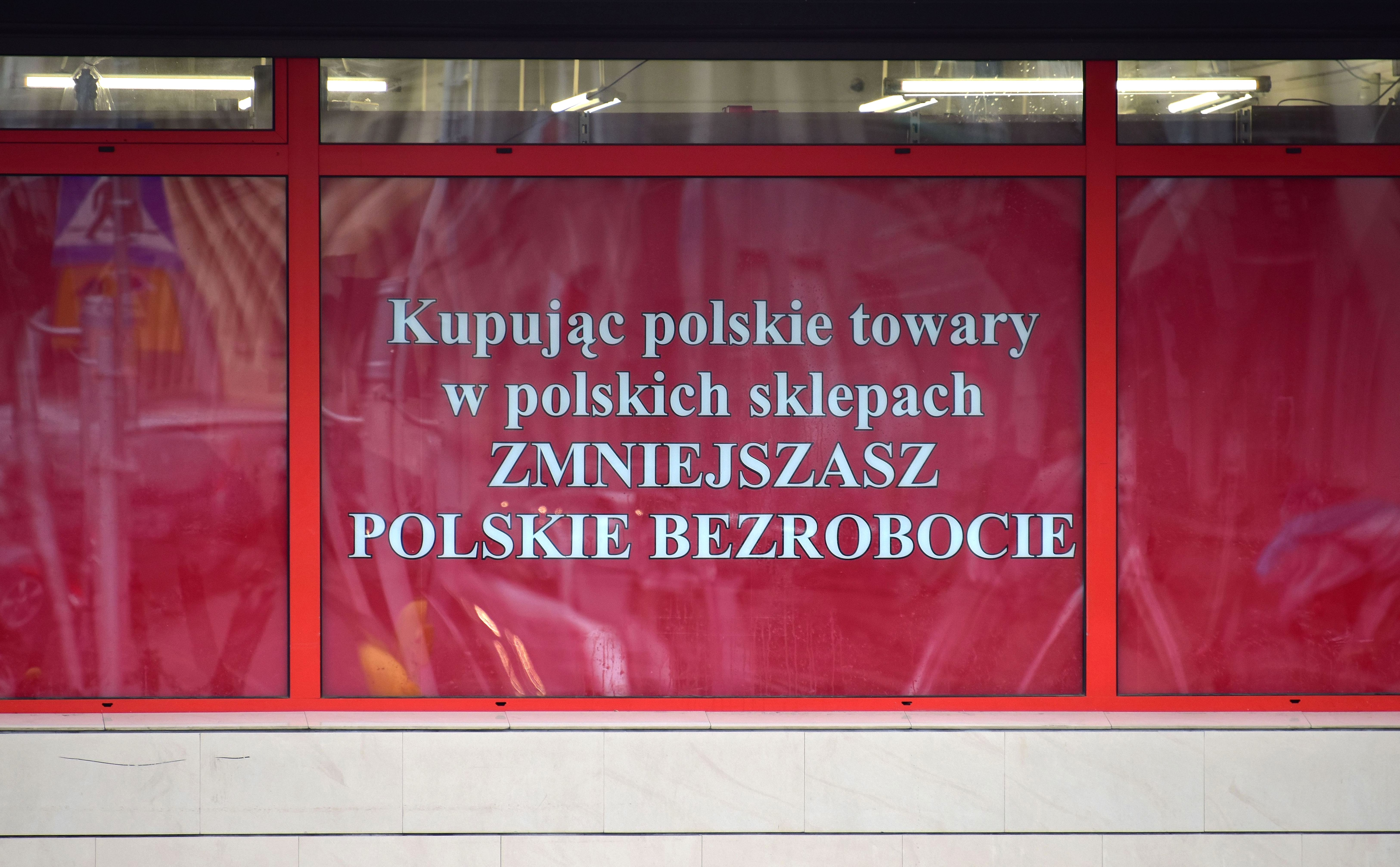
Storefront sign in Warsaw reading "By buying Polish goods in Polish shops you reduce Polish unemployment," illustrating consumer ethnocentrism.

Consumer ethnocentrism is a psychological concept that describes how consumers purchase products based on country of origin.

It refers to ethnocentric views held by consumers in one country, the in-group, towards products from another country, the out-group (Shimp & Sharma, 1987). Consumers may believe that it is not appropriate, and possibly even immoral, to buy products from other countries.

Consumer ethnocentrism is derived from the more general psychological concept of ethnocentrism. Basically, ethnocentric individuals tend to view their group as superior to others. As such, they view other groups from the perspective of their own and reject those that are different while accepting those that are similar (Netemeyer et al., 1991; Shimp & Sharma, 1987). This, in turn, derives from earlier sociological theories of in-groups and out-groups (Shimp & Sharma, 1987). Ethnocentrism, it is consistently found, is normal for an in-group to an out-group (Jones, 1997; Ryan & Bogart, 1997).

Purchasing foreign products may be viewed as improper because it costs domestic jobs and hurts the economy. The purchase of foreign products may even be seen as simply unpatriotic (Klein, 2002; Netemeyer et al., 1991; Sharma, Shimp, & Shin, 1995; Shimp & Sharma, 1987).

== Attributes ==
Consumer ethnocentrism gives individuals an understanding of what purchases are acceptable to the in-group, as well as feelings of identity and belonging. For consumers who are not ethnocentric or polycentric consumers, products are evaluated on their merits less pertaining or exclusive of their country of origin, or possibly even viewed more positively because they are foreign (Shimp & Sharma, 1987; Vida & Dmitrovic, 2001).

Consumer disidentification is the counterpart of consumer ethnocentrism with respect to the consumer's own country: where consumer ethnocentrism denotes attraction toward the domestic group, consumer disidentification denotes an active rejection of and distancing from its consumption culture. The two are distinct constructs rather than opposite poles of a single scale, and consumer disidentification has been found to predict reduced purchasing of domestic products over and above consumer ethnocentrism (Josiassen, 2011). Together with consumer affinity and consumer animosity, which concern attraction toward and repulsion from foreign countries, the two form the attraction–repulsion framework of country-related consumer bias (Josiassen, 2011). Consumer disidentification is measured with a six-item, seven-point Likert scale whose items are worded for the domestic consumer group in question; in the original Dutch study these included "I object to being seen as just another Dutch consumer" and "Generally, I do not want to consume like the Dutch" (Josiassen, 2011).

Brodowsky (1998) studied consumer ethnocentrism among car buyers in the United States and found a strong positive relationship between high ethnocentrism and country-based bias in the evaluation of automobiles. Consumers with low ethnocentrism appeared to evaluate automobiles based more on the merits of the actual automobile rather than its country of origin. Brodowsky suggests that understanding consumer ethnocentrism is critical for knowing the country of origin effects.

Several antecedents of consumer ethnocentrism have been identified by various studies. Consumers who tend to be less ethnocentric are those who are young, those who are male, those who are better educated, and those with higher income levels (Balabanis et al., 2001; Good & Huddleston, 1995; Sharma et al., 1995).

Balabanis et al. (2001) found that the determinants of consumer ethnocentrism may vary from country to country and culture to culture. For example, in Turkey, patriotism was found to be the most important motive for consumer ethnocentrism (Acikdilli et al., 2017). This, it was theorized, was due to Turkey's collectivist culture, with patriotism being an important expression of loyalty to the group. In more individualistic cultures, such as in the Czech Republic, feelings of nationalism based on a sense of superiority and dominance appeared to provide the most important contribution to consumer ethnocentrism.

== The CETSCALE ==
Shimp and Sharma (1987) developed consumer ethnocentrism into a measurable construct through the use of the consumer ethnocentric tendencies scale (CETSCALE). The initial development of the CETSCALE began with 225 different questions, which were narrowed down to 100 before being sent to a survey group for the first purification study. Through repeated purification studies, the number of questions was finally reduced to 17. Repeated studies by Shimp and Sharma validated the CETSCALE in the United States.

While the 17-item CETSCALE is the original version developed by Shimp and Sharma (1987), shortened versions have been used. One, with 10 items, was developed alongside the full version.

This is probably the most frequently used version of the CETSCALE, as a result of its relatively few number of questions (Balabanis et al., 2001; Klein, 2002; Klein et al., 1998; Neese & Hult, 2002; Netemeyer et al., 1991; Vida & Dmitrovic, 2001). Other versions have been used with success, including a version used by Klein (2002) with just four items that was found to have a .96 correlation with the 10-item version.

The first major test of the validity of the CETSCALE in countries other than the United States was carried out in 1991 (Netemeyer et al., 1991; Wang, 1996). Netemeyer et al. (1991) conducted a survey among students in France, Japan, West Germany (Federal Republic of Germany), and the United States, and then compared the results.

Both the 17-item version and the 10-item version were tested. It was found that both versions of the CETSCALE were reliable across the different cultures where it was tested. The results also helped validate the CETSCALE as a measure of consumer ethnocentricity. Since that time, the CETSCALE has been used in many studies in many countries and cultures (Jiménez-Guerrero et al., 2014).
