= Euh Yoon-dae =

Euh Yoon-Dae
- 어윤대
- Born: 22 May 1945 (age 81); Chinhae, Korea, Empire of Japan
- Education: Korea University; Asian Institute of Management; University of Michigan
- Occupations: Professor emeritus, Korea University

Korean name
- Hangul: 어윤대
- Hanja: 魚允大
- RR: Eo Yundae
- MR: Ŏ Yundae

Euh Yoon-Dae (Korean: 어윤대; born 22 May 1945) is a South Korean professor, financier, and advisor for the South Korean government. He served as Chairman of KB Financial Group and of the Presidential Council on Nation Branding, Korea.

== Childhood and Education ==
Euh was born in Jinhae (now Changwon), Keishōnan-dō, Korea, Empire of Japan on 22 May 1945. He earned his B.A. and M.B.A. at Korea University, an M.B.A. at the Asian Institute of Management, and a Ph.D. in business administration at the University of Michigan. He has received honorary doctorate degrees at Yonsei University, Waseda University, Griffith University and Renmin University.

== Career ==
Recently, Euh Yoon-Dae served as Chairman of KB Financial Group, Korea's second largest banking group. He was also the first Chairman of the Presidential Council on Nation Branding, Korea from its establishment in January 2009 to 2010.

A former President of Korea University (2003–2006), Euh also served in various advisory roles for the South Korean government. He was also former Vice-Chair of the National Economic Advisory Council, Chairman of Advisory Board of the Ministry of Education and Human Resources, and sat on the Public Fund Oversight Commission. He served as a Monetary Board Member of the Bank of Korea as well as a Board Member of the Korea Development Bank. From 1993 to 2004, he served as Policy Advisor for the Ministry of Foreign Affairs and Trade. He was also Chairman of the Steering Committee of Korea Investment Corporation (KIC), responsible for setting policies and reviewing management performance. Euh was founding President of the Korea Center for International Finance, established in 1999. He previously headed the Korean Academic Society of Business Administration and Korea Monetary and Finance Association.

=== Korea University (President): 2003–2006 ===
During his presidency (2003–2006), 12,000 seats were secured within the library (the largest number of library seats amongst Korean universities), one third of classes were conducted in English, the number of foreign exchange students increased sharply, and modern buildings and shopping malls were built. Despite much advancement, Euh failed to be reelected as president.

=== Presidential Council on Nation Branding (Chairman): 2009 – 2010 ===
Euh Yoon-Dae was chairman of the Presidential Council on Nation Branding. He was appointed to this position in January 2009.

The Council was established on January 22, 2009 by Executive Decree 21283 with the objective to promote South Korea's global image; to right misconceptions about South Korea, its culture, its products, and its people; and to raise respect for South Korea so as to support South Korean businesses and nationals abroad through governmental initiated strategies and policies.

=== KB Financial Group (Chairman): 2010 – 2013 ===
Euh Yoon-Dae was inaugurated as Chairman of KB Financial Group on July 13, 2010. In his inaugural speech, Euh said the Group needed to slim down and cut costs to achieve its vision of becoming a global bank, and he has launched reforms since then.
