= Consumer affinity =

Consumer attraction to a particular foreign country

Consumer affinity is a concept in marketing and consumer behaviour describing favourable feelings held by consumers toward a particular foreign country, and the effect of those feelings on their behaviour toward that country's products, services and destinations. It was introduced by Eva M. Oberecker, Petra Riefler and Adamantios Diamantopoulos, who characterised it as capturing "country-specific favorable feelings toward particular foreign countries".

== Conceptualisation ==
Affinity is directed at a specific foreign country rather than at foreign products in general, and is affective rather than evaluative: it concerns how a consumer feels about a country, not what they judge its products to be like. Reported sources of affinity include a country's lifestyle, scenery and culture, and personal experience of it such as travel or contact with its people.

== Measurement and effects ==
A measurement instrument was subsequently developed distinguishing two dimensions of affinity, sympathy and attachment, representing milder and stronger positive emotion toward the country. In that study affinity explained perceived risk and willingness to buy better than consumers' ethnocentric tendencies did, and for perceived risk, visit intentions and investment intentions it was more influential than cognitive evaluations of the country's image.

The construct has been extended to tourism, where tourism affinity describes sympathy, admiration or attachment toward a particular destination country and has been found to predict outcomes including word of mouth and resident hospitality.

== Relationship to other constructs ==
Consumer affinity is the counterpart of consumer animosity, which concerns antipathy toward a specific foreign country. It is also distinct from consumer ethnocentrism, which concerns a general preference for domestic over foreign products rather than feeling toward any particular country.

Affinity is one of four constructs in the attraction–repulsion framework of country-related consumer bias, which classifies such biases by whether they are directed at the consumer's own country or a foreign one, and whether they take the form of attraction or repulsion. On this account affinity denotes attraction toward a foreign country, animosity repulsion from one, consumer ethnocentrism attraction toward the domestic country, and consumer disidentification repulsion from it.

== See also ==
- Consumer ethnocentrism
- Country-of-origin effect
