= Consumer animosity =

Consumer aversion to products from a disliked country

Consumer animosity is a concept in marketing and consumer behaviour describing consumers' antipathy toward a particular foreign country and the effect of that antipathy on their willingness to buy products associated with it. It was introduced by Jill Gabrielle Klein, Richard Ettenson and Marlene D. Morris, who defined animosity as "the remnants of antipathy related to previous or ongoing military, political, or economic events".

== The animosity model ==
The animosity model was first tested among consumers in Nanjing, China, with respect to Japan and Japanese products. Nanjing was chosen because it was the site of the Nanjing Massacre of 1937–38; respondents who remained angry about the massacre were less willing to buy Japanese goods and were found to own fewer Japanese electronic and durable products. Its central claim is that animosity reduces willingness to buy a country's products independently of judgements about product quality: consumers may regard the products as well made and still decline to buy them. This distinguishes animosity from the country-of-origin effect, which operates through inferences about product attributes. The model also found that animosity affected purchase decisions over and above the effect of consumer ethnocentrism.

== Dimensions ==
Animosity was originally specified as having two components, war animosity and economic animosity, the former arising from military conflict and occupation and the latter from perceived unfair trade practices. Later research has extended the construct to further domains, including political animosity and cultural or religious animosity, and has examined whether animosity is stable or situational, that is, whether it reflects enduring historical grievance or is triggered by current events.

== Relationship to other constructs ==
Consumer animosity is conceptually distinct from consumer ethnocentrism. Ethnocentrism concerns a general preference for domestic over foreign products, whereas animosity is directed at a specific country.

Animosity is one of four constructs in the attraction–repulsion framework of country-related consumer bias, which classifies such biases by whether they are directed at the consumer's own country or a foreign one, and whether they take the form of attraction or repulsion. On this account animosity denotes repulsion from a foreign country, consumer ethnocentrism attraction toward the domestic one, consumer disidentification repulsion from the domestic one, and consumer affinity attraction toward a foreign one. Consumer affinity, the counterpart of animosity, was subsequently developed as a construct in its own right.

Animosity is distinct from participation in an organised boycott. Animosity is a standing disposition toward a country, whereas boycott participation is a behaviour shaped by its own motivations, including the perceived likelihood of making a difference, self-enhancement, and the personal cost of forgoing the boycotted goods.

== See also ==
- Consumer ethnocentrism
- Country-of-origin effect
- Boycott
