= Good Country Index =

Index measuring how much each country contributes to the planet and the human race

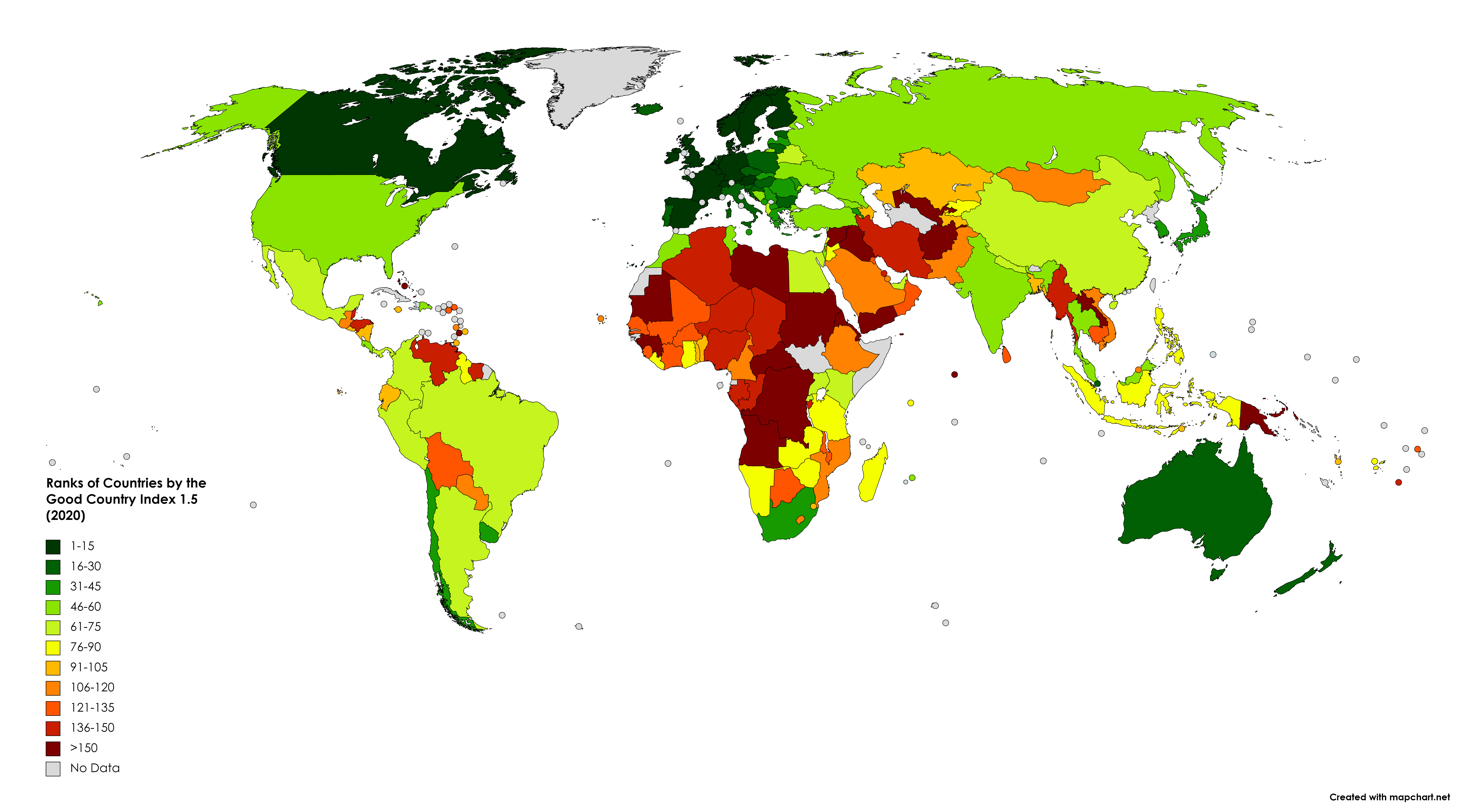
Ranks of countries by the Good Country Index 1.5 (2020)

The Good Country Index measures how much each of the 163 countries on the list contribute to the planet, and to the human species, through their policies and behaviors.

== Top 50 overall rank (version 1.6) ==
| 2023 rank | Country |
|---|---|
| 1 | Finland |
| 2 | Sweden |
| 3 | Germany |
| 4 | Denmark |
| 5 | France |
| 6 | United Kingdom |
| 7 | Canada |
| 8 | Slovenia |
| 9 | Estonia |
| 10 | Belgium |
| 11 | Austria |
| 12 | Czech Republic |
| 13 | Ireland |
| 14 | Spain |
| 15 | Portugal |
| 16 | Switzerland |
| 17 | Norway |
| 18 | Netherlands |
| 19 | Australia |
| 20 | Hungary |
| 21 | Lithuania |
| 22 | Bulgaria |
| 23 | Poland |
| 24 | New Zealand |
| 25 | Luxembourg |
| 26 | Iceland |
| 27 | Malta |
| 28 | Singapore |
| 29 | Liechtenstein |
| 30 | Italy |
| 31 | Latvia |
| 32 | Slovakia |
| 33 | Romania |
| 34 | Japan |
| 35 | Chile |
| 36 | Greece |
| 37 | Moldova |
| 38 | Cyprus |
| 39 | South Korea |
| 40 | Croatia |
| 41 | Uruguay |
| 42 | Bosnia and Herzegovina |
| 43 | Serbia |
| 44 | Montenegro |
| 45 | North Macedonia |
| 46 | Tunisia |
| 47 | Malaysia |
| 48 | Ukraine |
| 49 | Albania |
| 50 | United States |

== Top 50 overall rank (version 1.5) ==
| 2022 rank | Country |
|---|---|
| 1 | Sweden |
| 2 | Denmark |
| 3 | Germany |
| 4 | Netherlands |
| 5 | Finland |
| 6 | Canada |
| 7 | Belgium |
| 8 | Ireland |
| 9 | France |
| 10 | Austria |
| 11 | Norway |
| 12 | Luxembourg |
| 13 | Spain |
| 14 | United Kingdom |
| 15 | Switzerland |
| 16 | Cyprus |
| 17 | Slovenia |
| 18 | Australia |
| 19 | New Zealand |
| 20 | Iceland |
| 21 | Bulgaria |
| 22 | Estonia |
| 23 | Hungary |
| 24 | Italy |
| 25 | Singapore |
| 26 | Lithuania |
| 27 | Poland |
| 28 | Czech Republic |
| 29 | Portugal |
| 30 | Croatia |
| 31 | Malta |
| 32 | Slovakia |
| 33 | Chile |
| 34 | Japan |
| 35 | Latvia |
| 36 | Greece |
| 37 | South Korea |
| 38 | Serbia |
| 39 | North Macedonia |
| 40 | Moldova |
| 41 | Romania |
| 42 | Montenegro |
| 43 | Armenia |
| 44 | South Africa |
| 45 | Uruguay |
| 46 | Cuba |
| 47 | India |
| 48 | Malaysia |
| 49 | Costa Rica |
| 50 | Bosnia and Herzegovina |

== 2018 top 10 overall rank (version 1.3) ==
| 2018 rank | Country |
|---|---|
| 1 | Finland |
| 2 | Netherlands |
| 3 | Ireland |
| 4 | Sweden |
| 5 | Germany |
| 6 | Denmark |
| 7 | Switzerland |
| 8 | Norway |
| 9 | France |
| 10 | Spain |

== 2017 top 163 overall rank (version 1.2) ==
| 2017 rank | Country | Science and Technology | Culture and Civilisation | International Peace and Security | Police and World Order | Planet and Climate | Prosperity and Equality | Health and Well-being |
|---|---|---|---|---|---|---|---|---|
| 1 | Netherlands | 8 | 2 | 27 | 3 | 19 | 4 | 9 |
| 2 | Switzerland | 11 | 4 | 44 | 10 | 2 | 5 | 6 |
| 3 | Denmark | 4 | 6 | 64 | 9 | 14 | 2 | 3 |
| 4 | Finland | 7 | 13 | 52 | 8 | 6 | 9 | 12 |
| 5 | Germany | 21 | 15 | 37 | 2 | 18 | 14 | 7 |
| 6 | Sweden | 17 | 5 | 67 | 4 | 26 | 3 | 1 |
| 7 | Ireland | 32 | 8 | 50 | 21 | 10 | 1 | 2 |
| 8 | United Kingdom | 5 | 11 | 48 | 12 | 11 | 35 | 4 |
| 9 | Austria | 6 | 7 | 65 | 1 | 17 | 13 | 28 |
| 10 | Norway | 49 | 22 | 51 | 7 | 5 | 8 | 5 |
| 11 | France | 24 | 14 | 53 | 16 | 3 | 17 | 23 |
| 12 | Hungary | 3 | 19 | 17 | 43 | 32 | 23 | 33 |
| 13 | Belgium | 9 | 1 | 109 | 13 | 22 | 7 | 16 |
| 14 | Canada | 29 | 25 | 41 | 11 | 39 | 27 | 8 |
| 15 | Singapore | 26 | 29 | 14 | 30 | 21 | 19 | 49 |
| 16 | Italy | 41 | 26 | 55 | 14 | 7 | 36 | 24 |
| 17 | New Zealand | 12 | 35 | 33 | 19 | 27 | 69 | 17 |
| 18 | Spain | 40 | 30 | 70 | 15 | 9 | 34 | 22 |
| 19 | Luxembourg | 37 | 10 | 100 | 20 | 30 | 56 | 11 |
| 20 | Cyprus | 31 | 44 | 73 | 17 | 4 | 38 | 59 |
| 21 | Japan | 61 | 45 | 18 | 47 | 33 | 47 | 21 |
| 22 | Bulgaria | 14 | 39 | 69 | 32 | 40 | 39 | 53 |
| 23 | Australia | 20 | 48 | 54 | 6 | 50 | 102 | 13 |
| 24 | Portugal | 39 | 12 | 133 | 28 | 23 | 21 | 39 |
| 25 | United States | 38 | 67 | 72 | 29 | 35 | 62 | 10 |
| 26 | Greece | 27 | 47 | 115 | 31 | 15 | 50 | 29 |
| 27 | Iceland | 15 | 37 | 77 | 42 | 1 | 105 | 41 |
| 28 | Estonia | 36 | 3 | 93 | 72 | 57 | 37 | 27 |
| 29 | South Korea | 44 | 34 | 103 | 33 | 98 | 65 | 19 |
| 30 | Poland | 23 | 21 | 107 | 24 | 34 | 46 | 79 |
| 31 | Moldova | 47 | 46 | 9 | 64 | 73 | 22 | 87 |
| 32 | Slovenia | 10 | 16 | 160 | 18 | 12 | 77 | 57 |
| 33 | Malta | 62 | 28 | 124 | 5 | 20 | 42 | 76 |
| 34 | Czech Republic | 2 | 9 | 98 | 48 | 60 | 98 | 47 |
| 35 | Chile | 74 | 51 | 19 | 26 | 43 | 73 | 91 |
| 36 | Croatia | 33 | 38 | 146 | 58 | 13 | 10 | 83 |
| 37 | Malaysia | 52 | 41 | 34 | 40 | 149 | 19 | 46 |
| 38 | Turkey | 55 | 75 | 78 | 39 | 51 | 40 | 44 |
| 39 | Costa Rica | 76 | 32 | 16 | 22 | 46 | 82 | 110 |
| 40 | Romania | 30 | 31 | 58 | 36 | 37 | 81 | 112 |
| 41 | Latvia | 13 | 17 | 104 | 70 | 42 | 80 | 70 |
| 42 | Lithuania | 18 | 23 | 99 | 56 | 16 | 124 | 64 |
| 43 | Mauritius | 83 | 27 | 56 | 34 | 78 | 25 | 126 |
| 44 | Morocco | 45 | 85 | 10 | 114 | 79 | 43 | 58 |
| 45 | Albania | 28 | 33 | 84 | 45 | 132 | 6 | 106 |
| 46 | North Macedonia | 19 | 55 | 135 | 54 | 65 | 74 | 34 |
| 47 | South Africa | 25 | 65 | 2 | 25 | 150 | 114 | 56 |
| 48 | Slovakia | 42 | 20 | 113 | 52 | 24 | 142 | 52 |
| 49 | Uruguay | 135 | 59 | 6 | 37 | 8 | 135 | 80 |
| 50 | Barbados | 35 | 18 | 126 | 103 | 54 | 32 | 103 |
| 51 | Philippines | 146 | 58 | 47 | 61 | 56 | 12 | 94 |
| 52 | Jordan | 65 | 91 | 31 | 111 | 137 | 24 | 18 |
| 53 | Israel | 34 | 63 | 123 | 84 | 25 | 99 | 51 |
| 54 | Ukraine | 1 | 62 | 108 | 57 | 128 | 72 | 55 |
| 55 | Thailand | 107 | 54 | 21 | 23 | 138 | 109 | 37 |
| 56 | Tunisia | 72 | 93 | 3 | 107 | 69 | 70 | 92 |
| 57 | Georgia | 86 | 109 | 79 | 101 | 55 | 11 | 66 |
| 58 | United Arab Emirates | 84 | 53 | 147 | 53 | 115 | 49 | 14 |
| 59 | India | 67 | 57 | 32 | 89 | 97 | 49 | 35 |
| 60 | Qatar | 145 | 114 | 36 | 94 | 62 | 61 | 25 |
| 61 | Bosnia and Herzegovina | 16 | 69 | 149 | 35 | 135 | 45 | 95 |
| 62 | Lebanon | 68 | 66 | 153 | 76 | 89 | 31 | 63 |
| 63 | Kenya | 59 | 83 | 63 | 44 | 63 | 130 | 114 |
| 64 | Fiji | 50 | 81 | 76 | 161 | 109 | 44 | 36 |
| 65 | Russia | 53 | 101 | 82 | 97 | 67 | 116 | 43 |
| 66 | Guatemala | 119 | 83 | 23 | 71 | 113 | 78 | 77 |
| 67 | Sri Lanka | 117 | 141 | 26 | 78 | 72 | 52 | 78 |
| 68 | Oman | 123 | 126 | 11 | 119 | 86 | 75 | 26 |
| 69 | Serbia | 105 | 78 | 80 | 74 | 83 | 15 | 138 |
| 70 | Panama | 99 | 117 | 110 | 27 | 99 | 68 | 54 |
| 71 | Montenegro | 48 | 61 | 128 | 41 | 91 | 71 | 134 |
| 72 | Nicaragua | 110 | 100 | 96 | 87 | 140 | 20 | 30 |
| 73 | Egypt | 60 | 123 | 4 | 120 | 70 | 134 | 73 |
| 74 | Mexico | 95 | 64 | 85 | 99 | 90 | 108 | 48 |
| 75 | Armenia | 56 | 103 | 136 | 104 | 108 | 48 | 31 |
| 76 | China | 70 | 111 | 40 | 109 | 96 | 113 | 48 |
| 77 | Uganda | 82 | 107 | 90 | 63 | 71 | 87 | 90 |
| 78 | Belarus | 46 | 95 | 132 | 92 | 75 | 84 | 67 |
| 79 | Samoa | 64 | 60 | 1 | 130 | 45 | 145 | 146 |
| 80 | Brazil | 109 | 119 | 61 | 50 | 53 | 162 | 40 |
| 81 | Ecuador | 139 | 106 | 24 | 80 | 94 | 110 | 50 |
| 82 | Argentina | 75 | 119 | 39 | 49 | 112 | 100 | 122 |
| 83 | Timor-Leste | 73 | 133 | 49 | 102 | 120 | 29 | 105 |
| 84 | Dominican Republic | 122 | 125 | 129 | 51 | 31 | 76 | 81 |
| 85 | Kuwait | 127 | 110 | 140 | 81 | 66 | 83 | 20 |
| 86 | Burkina Faso | 92 | 124 | 46 | 66 | 148 | 30 | 125 |
| 87 | Colombia | 78 | 118 | 15 | 121 | 88 | 119 | 98 |
| 88 | Namibia | 66 | 42 | 89 | 106 | 103 | 136 | 96 |
| 89 | Azerbaijan | 129 | 139 | 42 | 132 | 29 | 86 | 89 |
| 90 | Kyrgyzstan | 80 | 76 | 121 | 66 | 159 | 60 | 86 |
| 91 | Grenada | 22 | 50 | 62 | 152 | 77 | 155 | 133 |
| 92 | Brunei | 125 | 79 | 8 | 163 | 49 | 158 | 68 |
| 93 | Senegal | 69 | 87 | 43 | 100 | 139 | 59 | 160 |
| 94 | Seychelles | 89 | 49 | 150 | 60 | 100 | 101 | 120 |
| 95 | Peru | 102 | 90 | 97 | 95 | 80 | 96 | 113 |
| 96 | Dominica | 51 | 73 | 137 | 116 | 81 | 104 | 111 |
| 97 | Mongolia | 131 | 96 | 28 | 141 | 118 | 33 | 130 |
| 98 | Cameroon | 101 | 144 | 13 | 90 | 105 | 150 | 74 |
| 99 | Bolivia | 161 | 98 | 45 | 46 | 136 | 106 | 85 |
| 100 | Indonesia | 160 | 88 | 7 | 62 | 144 | 133 | 84 |
| 101 | Zambia | 154 | 149 | 57 | 55 | 64 | 121 | 82 |
| 102 | Rwanda | 118 | 161 | 29 | 144 | 36 | 54 | 141 |
| 103 | Togo | 111 | 117 | 38 | 133 | 161 | 16 | 148 |
| 104 | Ghana | 63 | 104 | 66 | 93 | 121 | 107 | 139 |
| 105 | Tanzania | 156 | 121 | 12 | 85 | 76 | 143 | 101 |
| 106 | Saudi Arabia | 81 | 136 | 141 | 117 | 122 | 85 | 15 |
| 107 | Bangladesh | 130 | 130 | 87 | 59 | 130 | 132 | 32 |
| 108 | Kazakhstan | 116 | 131 | 20 | 110 | 123 | 131 | 72 |
| 109 | El Salvador | 121 | 99 | 134 | 147 | 102 | 58 | 42 |
| 110 | Trinidad and Tobago | 93 | 71 | 116 | 136 | 111 | 28 | 152 |
| 111 | Marshall Islands | 43 | 40 | 162 | 149 | 129 | 41 | 144 |
| 112 | Eswatini | 104 | 112 | 156 | 125 | 47 | 55 | 117 |
| 113 | Jamaica | 77 | 86 | 74 | 86 | 101 | 146 | 147 |
| 114 | Zimbabwe | 98 | 112 | 70 | 151 | 145 | 26 | 107 |
| 115 | Algeria | 113 | 138 | 22 | 79 | 48 | 160 | 159 |
| 116 | Antigua and Barbuda | 91 | 74 | 103 | 131 | 68 | 139 | 124 |
| 117 | Cape Verde | 103 | 84 | 138 | 108 | 28 | 115 | 154 |
| 118 | Botswana | 133 | 72 | 112 | 75 | 110 | 90 | 145 |
| 119 | Malawi | 94 | 142 | 60 | 69 | 146 | 111 | 116 |
| 120 | Madagascar | 106 | 97 | 25 | 126 | 153 | 103 | 136 |
| 121 | Bahamas | 114 | 52 | 94 | 148 | 59 | 127 | 155 |
| 122 | Honduras | 136 | 120 | 88 | 122 | 158 | 64 | 62 |
| 123 | Pakistan | 88 | 150 | 92 | 129 | 134 | 123 | 38 |
| 124 | Paraguay | 155 | 140 | 30 | 82 | 127 | 154 | 69 |
| 125 | Saint Vincent and the Grenadines | 97 | 43 | 142 | 124 | 38 | 144 | 162 |
| 126 | Nigeria | 142 | 146 | 5 | 137 | 61 | 122 | 150 |
| 127 | Lesotho | 148 | 108 | 102 | 118 | 124 | 67 | 100 |
| 128 | Vietnam | 128 | 102 | 59 | 158 | 141 | 88 | 99 |
| 129 | Saint Lucia | 54 | 24 | 139 | 157 | 126 | 125 | 151 |
| 130 | Burundi | 71 | 160 | 125 | 150 | 107 | 92 | 74 |
| 131 | Iran | 90 | 157 | 83 | 68 | 117 | 148 | 118 |
| 132 | Guinea | 96 | 132 | 122 | 123 | 156 | 94 | 60 |
| 133 | Liberia | 79 | 153 | 154 | 38 | 160 | 128 | 71 |
| 134 | Laos | 100 | 145 | 105 | 159 | 41 | 112 | 123 |
| 135 | Guyana | 158 | 68 | 75 | 154 | 116 | 118 | 97 |
| 136 | Niger | 120 | 128 | 101 | 88 | 157 | 51 | 143 |
| 137 | Bahrain | 115 | 105 | 159 | 77 | 82 | 157 | 93 |
| 138 | Tonga | 85 | 70 | 161 | 162 | 84 | 79 | 149 |
| 139 | Haiti | 132 | 92 | 144 | 140 | 119 | 53 | 115 |
| 140 | Republic of the Congo | 144 | 137 | 68 | 124 | 74 | 120 | 137 |
| 141 | Guinea-Bissau | 57 | 151 | 163 | 73 | 152 | 91 | 121 |
| 142 | Suriname | 134 | 80 | 114 | 105 | 95 | 151 | 132 |
| 143 | Benin | 87 | 143 | 117 | 127 | 162 | 66 | 109 |
| 144 | Sierra Leone | 152 | 129 | 151 | 83 | 114 | 129 | 161 |
| 145 | Cambodia | 153 | 89 | 86 | 138 | 151 | 138 | 65 |
| 146 | Mozambique | 147 | 127 | 106 | 65 | 133 | 93 | 153 |
| 147 | Gabon | 151 | 158 | 81 | 96 | 58 | 152 | 128 |
| 148 | Ivory Coast | 126 | 116 | 120 | 156 | 92 | 95 | 129 |
| 149 | Democratic Republic of the Congo | 138 | 162 | 91 | 155 | 106 | 63 | 127 |
| 150 | Belize | 112 | 36 | 143 | 113 | 147 | 141 | 158 |
| 151 | Central African Republic | 58 | 159 | 148 | 146 | 142 | 89 | 108 |
| 152 | Venezuela | 149 | 154 | 118 | 91 | 85 | 156 | 104 |
| 153 | Papua New Guinea | 137 | 94 | 130 | 98 | 93 | 161 | 157 |
| 154 | Equatorial Guinea | 157 | 147 | 111 | 160 | 52 | 163 | 102 |
| 155 | Syria | 140 | 152 | 131 | 142 | 104 | 147 | 88 |
| 156 | Angola | 163 | 148 | 119 | 153 | 44 | 117 | 163 |
| 157 | Mali | 143 | 124 | 155 | 139 | 143 | 57 | 142 |
| 158 | Mauritania | 141 | 56 | 95 | 143 | 163 | 158 | 161 |
| 159 | Chad | 124 | 135 | 127 | 145 | 131 | 126 | 140 |
| 160 | Yemen | 108 | 155 | 157 | 128 | 125 | 137 | 119 |
| 161 | Iraq | 162 | 156 | 158 | 115 | 87 | 153 | 135 |
| 162 | Libya | 150 | 163 | 145 | 112 | 154 | 97 | 156 |
| 163 | Afghanistan | 159 | 115 | 152 | 135 | 155 | 140 | 131 |

.:

== 2016 top 10 overall rank (version 1.1) ==
| 2016 rank | Country |
|---|---|
| 1 | Sweden |
| 2 | Denmark |
| 3 | Netherlands |
| 4 | Canada |
| 5 | Switzerland |
| 6 | Germany |
| 7 | Finland |
| 8 | France |
| 9 | Austria |
| 10 | United Kingdom |

== 2014 top 10 overall rank (version 1.0) ==
| 2014 rank | Country |
|---|---|
| 1 | Ireland |
| 2 | Finland |
| 3 | Switzerland |
| 4 | Netherlands |
| 5 | New Zealand |
| 6 | Sweden |
| 7 | Belgium |
| 8 | Norway |
| 9 | Denmark |
| 10 | United Kingdom |

== Description ==
The Good Country Index is a composite statistic of 35 data points mostly generated by the United Nations. These data points are combined into a common measure which gives an overall ranking, and a ranking in seven categories:

- Science and Technology
- Culture
- International Peace and Security
- World Order
- Planet and Climate
- Prosperity and Equality
- Health and Well-being

The concept, and the index itself, were developed by Simon Anholt. The Index was built by Dr. Robert Govers with support from several other organisations.

The top three countries in the 2014 list were Ireland, Finland and Switzerland. Nine of the top 10 countries in overall rankings are in Western Europe, while Canada tops overall rankings in North America. The last three countries on the list are Iraq, Libya, and Afghanistan.

== Methodology ==
=== Testing and method ===
The Index attempts to measure the global impacts of national policies and behaviors: what the country contributes to the global commons, and what they take away. The Index utilizes 35 data points, five for each of seven categories. These data points are produced by the United Nations and by other international agencies, with a few by NGOs and other organisations.

Countries receive scores on each indicator as a fractional rank (0=top rank, 1=lowest) relative to all countries for which data are available. The category rankings are based on mean fractional ranks of the five indicators per category (subject to maximum two missing values per category). The overall rank is based on the average of the category ranks. This yields a common measure which gives an overall ranking, a ranking in each of the seven categories, and a balance-sheet for each country that shows at a glance how much it contributes to the world and how much it takes away.

=== Categories and indicators ===
Science, Technology & Knowledge

- Number of foreign students studying in the country relative to GDP
- Exports of periodicals, scientific journals and newspapers relative to GDP
- Number of articles published in international journals (2009 latest data) relative to GDP
- Number of Nobel prize winners relative to GDP
- Number of International Patent Cooperation Treaty applications relative to GDP

Culture

- Exports of creative goods (UNCTAD's Creative Economy Report categorisation) relative to GDP
- Exports of creative services (UNCTAD's Creative Economy Report categorisation) relative to GDP
- UNESCO dues in arrears as percentage of contribution (negative indicator)
- Number of countries and territories that citizens can enter without a visa
- Freedom of the press (based on mean score for Reporters without Borders and Freedom House index as a negative indicator)

International Peace and Security

- Number of peacekeeping troops sent overseas relative to GDP
- Dues in arrears to financial contribution to UN peacekeeping missions as percentage of contribution (negative indicator)
- Attributed number of casualties of international organised violence relative to GDP (negative indicator)
- Exports of weapons and ammunition relative to GDP (negative indicator)
- Global Cyber Security Index score (according to International Telecommunication Union)

World Order

- Percentage of population that gives to charity as proxy for cosmopolitan attitude
- Number of refugees hosted relative to GDP
- Number of refugees overseas relative to GDP (negative indicator)
- Population growth rate (negative indicator)
- Number of treaties signed as proxy for diplomatic action and peaceful conflict resolution

Planet and Climate

- National Footprint Accounts Biocapacity reserve (2009)
- Exports of hazardous waste relative to GDP (only 2008 and 2011 data available, so 2011 data used as negative indicator)
- Organic water pollutant (BOD) emissions relative to GDP (2007 latest data as negative indicator)
- CO_{2} emissions relative to GDP (negative indicator)
- Methane + nitrous oxide + other greenhouse gas (HFC, PFC and SF_{6}) emissions relative to GDP (negative indicator)

Prosperity and Equality

- Trading across borders (open trading performance compared to best practice; i.e. IFC distance to frontier score)
- Number of aid workers and volunteers sent overseas relative to GDP
- Fairtrade market size relative to GDP
- Foreign Direct Investment outflow relative to GDP
- Development cooperation contributions (aid) relative to GDP

Health and Wellbeing

- Amount of wheat tonnes equivalent food aid shipments relative to GDP
- Exports of pharmaceuticals relative to GDP
- Voluntary excess contributions to World Health Organization relative to GDP
- Humanitarian aid contributions relative to GDP
- International Health Regulations Compliance

== Criticism ==
The Economist's Daily Chart questions the validity of some of its results. It notes that scaling countries on a GDP basis skews it in favor of poorer countries, and that the interpretation of certain parameters is flawed, but also calls the index "a worthwhile pursuit by imagining how countries might compete when they aim to serve others."

== See also ==
- Globalization
- Sustainable development
- World Happiness Report
