= Destination marketing organization =

Organization promoting tourism to increase number of visitors

A destination marketing organization (DMO) is an organisation which promotes a location as an attractive travel destination. DMOs are also known as tourist boards, tourism authorities or Convention and Visitors Bureaus. They primarily exist to provide information to leisure travelers. Additionally, where a suitable infrastructure exists, they encourage event organizers to choose their location for meetings, incentives, conferences, and exhibitions, collectively abbreviated as MICE.

DMOs are generally tied to the local government infrastructure, often with supporting funds being generated by specific taxes, such as hotel taxes, membership fees, and sometimes government subsidies. However, in many cases, the observed decline in tourism following cutbacks to public-sector expenditures has motivated the tourism industry to create a private sector coalition in order to provide the functions of a DMO.

With the arrival of the internet more and more Destination Management Companies adopted the term "visit" and added it as a prefix to their city or country name. The phenomenon started in America in 1995 / 1996 and spread over the world with major organizations like the London Tourist Board adopting the concept after the turn of the century.

DMOs seek to build a destination image to promote their destinations. For any given travel situation, consumers are spoilt by choice of available destinations, and the images held of destination play a critical role in purchase decisions. Destination image therefore plays a major role in the competitiveness of travel destinations.

== See also ==
- MICE tourism
- Singapore Tourism Board
- Tourism board
- Tourism marketing
