= Place branding =

Marketing strategy

New York City's famous "I Love New York" logo

Kilgore city's Wordmark showing big and small cities alike benefit from Branding

Place branding (includes place marketing and place promotion) is a term based on the idea that "cities and regions can be branded," whereby branding techniques and other marketing strategies are applied to "the economic, political and cultural development of cities, regions and countries." As opposed to the branding of products and services, place branding is more multidimensional in nature, as a 'place' is inherently "anchored into a history, a culture, an ecosystem," which is then incorporated into a network of associations, "linking products, spaces, organizations and people."

A place brand is composed of the perceptions held about a specific place, both internally and externally. This place brand is shaped by the assets a specific place possesses, as well as media portrayals of the place and the actions undertaken both by the place itself (via its government) and its residents and private businesses.

While most cities, regions, and places have a ‘brand’ in some capacity, place branding refers to the specific actions undertaken to manage internal and external perceptions of a place. As such, the concepts of nation branding, region branding, and city branding (also known as urban branding), fall under the umbrella term of place branding.

The practice is understood to have gained significance with the emergence of the post-industrial society among developing nations, in which places contend in an interdependent, increasingly-globalized economy. Thus, place branding invariably relates to the notion that places compete with other places for people, resources, and business, and, as a result, many public administrations pursue such strategies. As of 2011, the global competition of cities is estimated to host at least 2.7 million small cities/towns, 3,000 large cities, and 455 metropolises,

In essence, place branding is "a strategy for projecting images and managing perceptions about places". As such, it purposes to induce affective responses from consumers, thereby forming a meaningful relationship between person and place.

== Origins ==
Most often associated with capitalistic function, branding has traditionally been understood as a strategy used when promoting goods and services to evoke an emotional response from consumers. Accordingly, place branding follows the notion that places (e.g. cities and urban spaces) can be "shaped and managed just like any other brand."

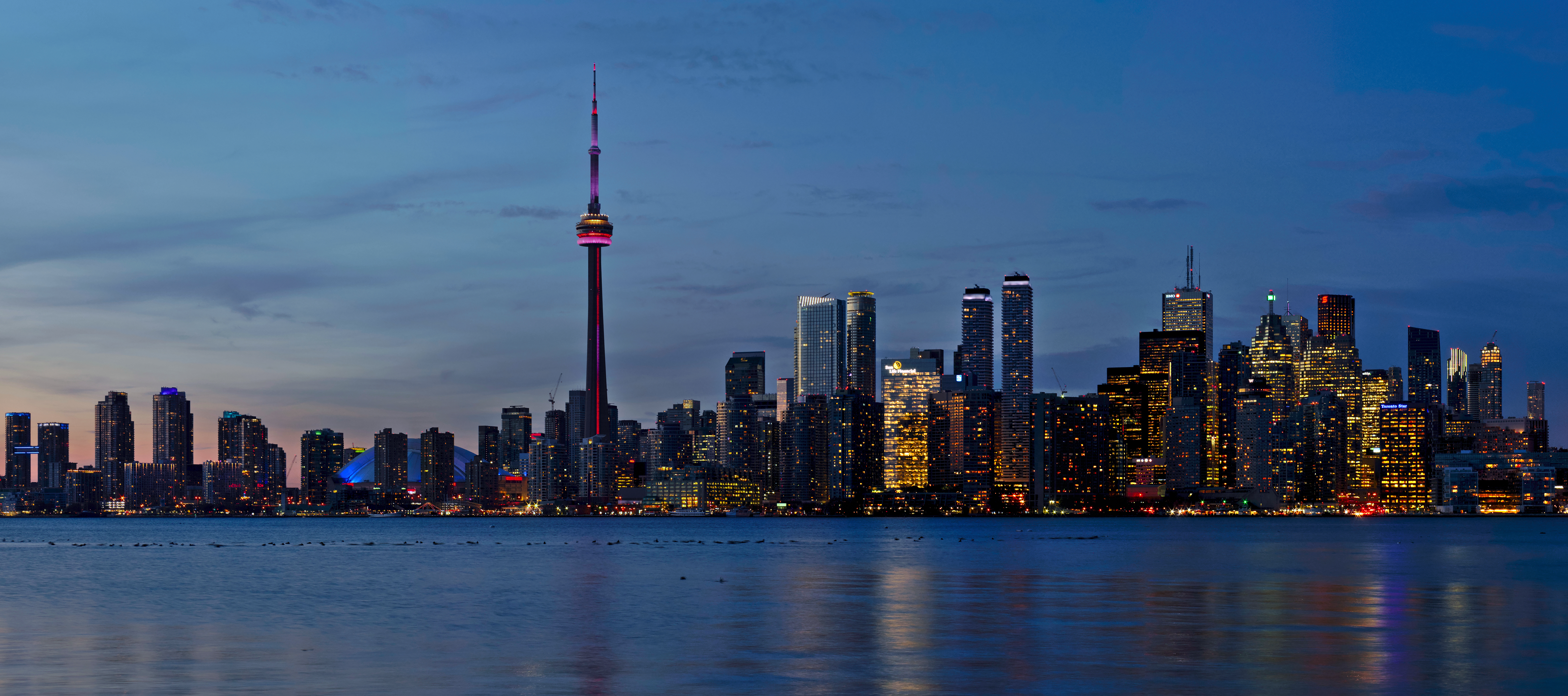
Skyline of Toronto, Ontario, including the CN Tower

The practice of place branding is understood to have emerged in the mid-19th century. The United States, in particular, began such strategies to attract rural populations to urban centers for labor. Later, the practice would be used for tourism purposes, especially in Europe, with famous posters of places. However, the practice would not become commonplace among cities and countries until recent years. This emphasis is considered to represent a broader phenomenon that emerged around the 1970s known as urban regeneration, whereby systems of production within developed countries became "vertically disintegrated," giving way to post-industrial societies, typified by "entrepreneurial" forms of governance. Such interest seems to have come out of recognition that "places of all kinds can benefit from implementing coherent strategies with regard to managing their resources, reputation and image."

== In Academia ==
Though scholarly interest in the domain of place branding is still in its nascent stages, published academic research has seen considerable increase in recent years. As the world economy becomes more and more integrated and interconnected, this interest will only continue to grow, especially as cities compete for "talent attraction, tourism promotion, the hosting of sporting and cultural events, investment attraction, and the many other goals that cities set out to achieve in their quest for urban development and regeneration."

Place branding is an interdisciplinary approach that can be focused in on as a field in sociology (including urban sociology, criminology, and cultural sociology), political science, cultural anthropology, cultural studies, communication studies, marketing, international relations, and others. It may even be applied to other arts and humanities, such as film studies or literature, in so far as observing how places are portrayed or imagined (e.g. Thebes in Oedipus Rex or Gotham City in the Batman franchise).

== Impacts of Globalization ==
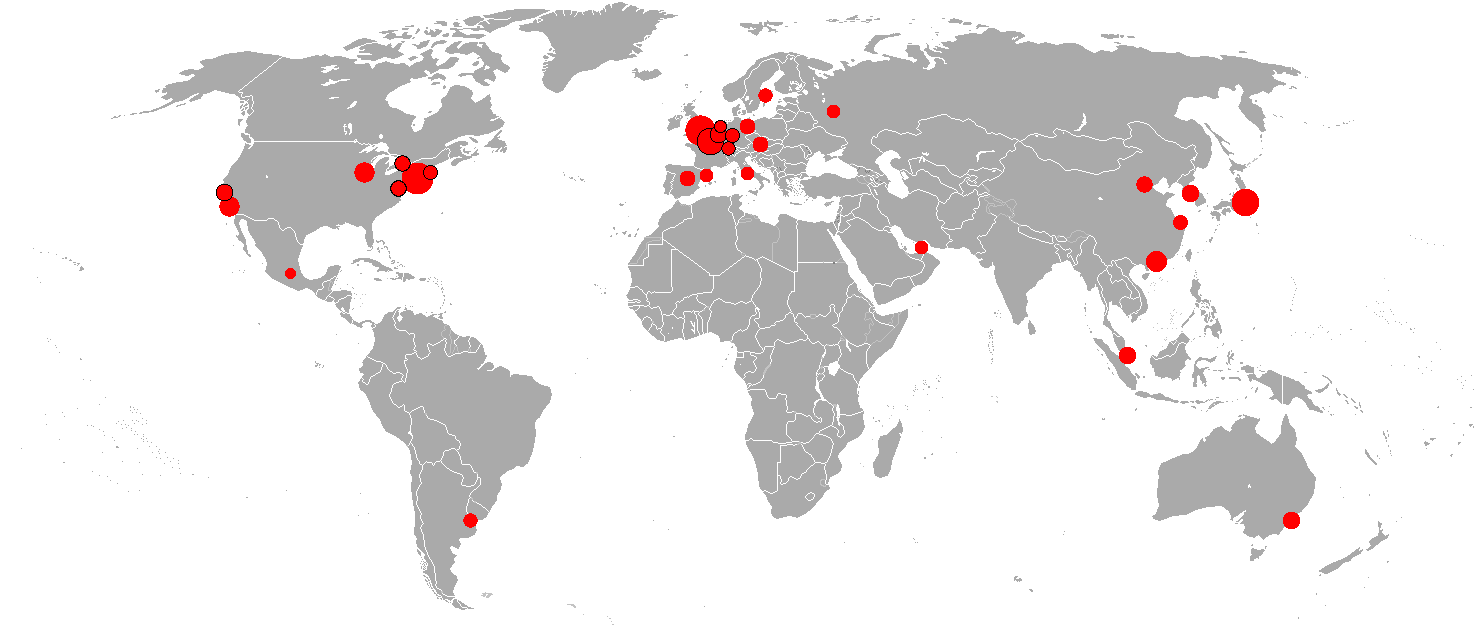
Global Cities Index

One of the tenets of place branding posits that the struggle for attention and preference is not limited to commercial goods and services; it applies equally to geopolitical entities. Countries and cities compete for tourist income, business, and often tax bases. Even within cities, there is a fierce competition between city centres, urban vs. suburban areas; big-box retailers vs. local businesses; shopping malls vs. traditional downtowns. Proponents of place branding argue that this heightened competitive environment makes it important for places, no matter their size or composition, to clearly differentiate themselves and convey why they are relevant and valued options.

This view is supported and defended by Joao Freire, among others, who states that successful destination-brand management can be seen as an exercise of coordination where relevant variables—such as tourism infrastructures, quality of local services, and other destination-brand users need to be managed in order to achieve a coherent and desired destination-brand identity. Thus, contrary to popular conception that destination-brand building is solely an exercise in communication, destination branding is, in reality, an exercise of identification, organization and coordination of all the variables that affect the destination image.

The strategic application of place branding is growing with nations, regions, cities, and institutions as they realize they compete with other places for people, resources, and business. The phenomenon of place branding, as an organic process of image communication without strategy, has been occurring throughout history.

== Processes ==
Place branding is a process made up of several sub-processes. Unlike branding simpler entities like a product, service, company, person or classical subjects of branding, place branding, and in particular nation and city branding, is a complex process. The complexity comes from the great diversity of stakeholders in the process.

In general, a place brand is derived from existing assets of the place such as its value offering or public perception. Otherwise, the place brand is derived from created assets, such as events, policies, abstract concepts of tolerance, and so on.

The derived image of the place brand is then communicated through communication channels. These channels vary and range from television advertisements to Internet marketing efforts. These communications are aimed at a specific target market, usually with the ambition to change perceptions, grow awareness, or attract key audiences such as visitors, residents, or investors.

== City/Urban Branding ==
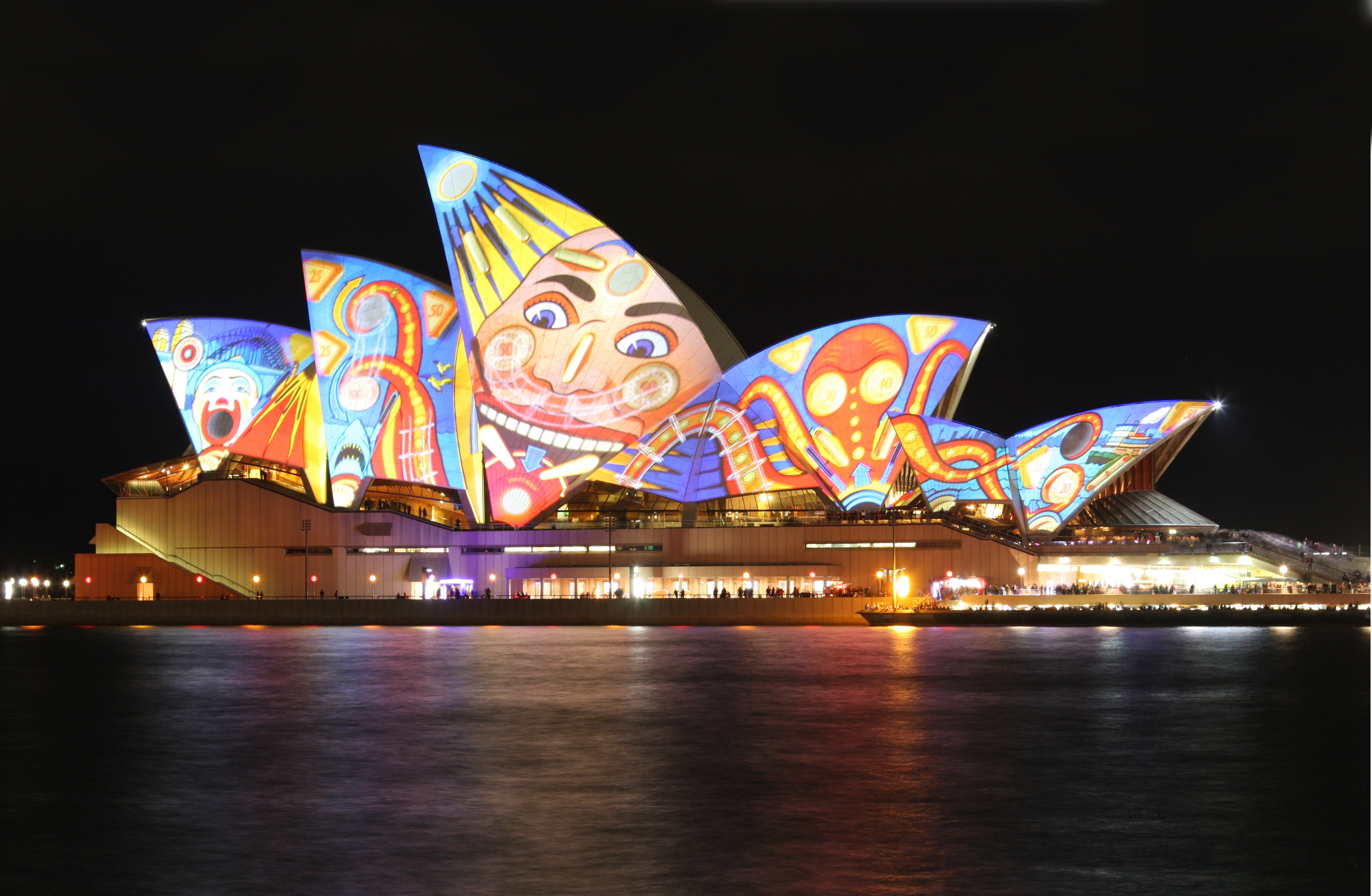
The Sydney Opera House during Vivid Sydney (2013), an annual festival of light, music, and ideas.

City branding (also known as urban branding) refers to all the activities that are undergone with the purpose of turning a city from a location into a destination. "Successful branding," says Robert Jones, consultant director at international brand consultancy Wolff Olins, "can turn a city into a place where people want to live, work and visit." City branding is often confused with city marketing. The two differ in the fact that marketing uses consumer wishes and needs as its guiding principle for the operations of an organization, whereas in the case of branding a chosen vision, mission and identity play that role.

City branding creates a single brand for the city and extends it to all its offerings and interactions. From a consumer's point of view, this creates a unique picture of the city at every level of interaction. This also helps in removing the need to present a case-by-case picture of the city for each of its offerings to the customers.

A city brand is its promise of value, a promise that needs to be kept. Good branding can assist in making cities desirable, just as bad branding can assist in making cities undesirable. This has a subsequent economic impact for the city. Research shows that perception impacts between 23% and 37% on the overall tourism, investment, and talent economy for a city or nation. Consequently, a 0.1-point increase in perceptions could result in 12-21% increases in tourism receipts and FDI inflow.

Some examples of well-branded cities are New York City, San Francisco and Paris. Case studies indicate that successful city branding initiatives often leverage local history, urban amenities, lifestyle attributes, cultural offerings, and demographic diversity. These initiatives typically rely on collaborative partnerships between municipal and regional governments to enhance public infrastructure.Strategic positioning is also considered a core component of city branding.

=== Examples of strong City Brands ===
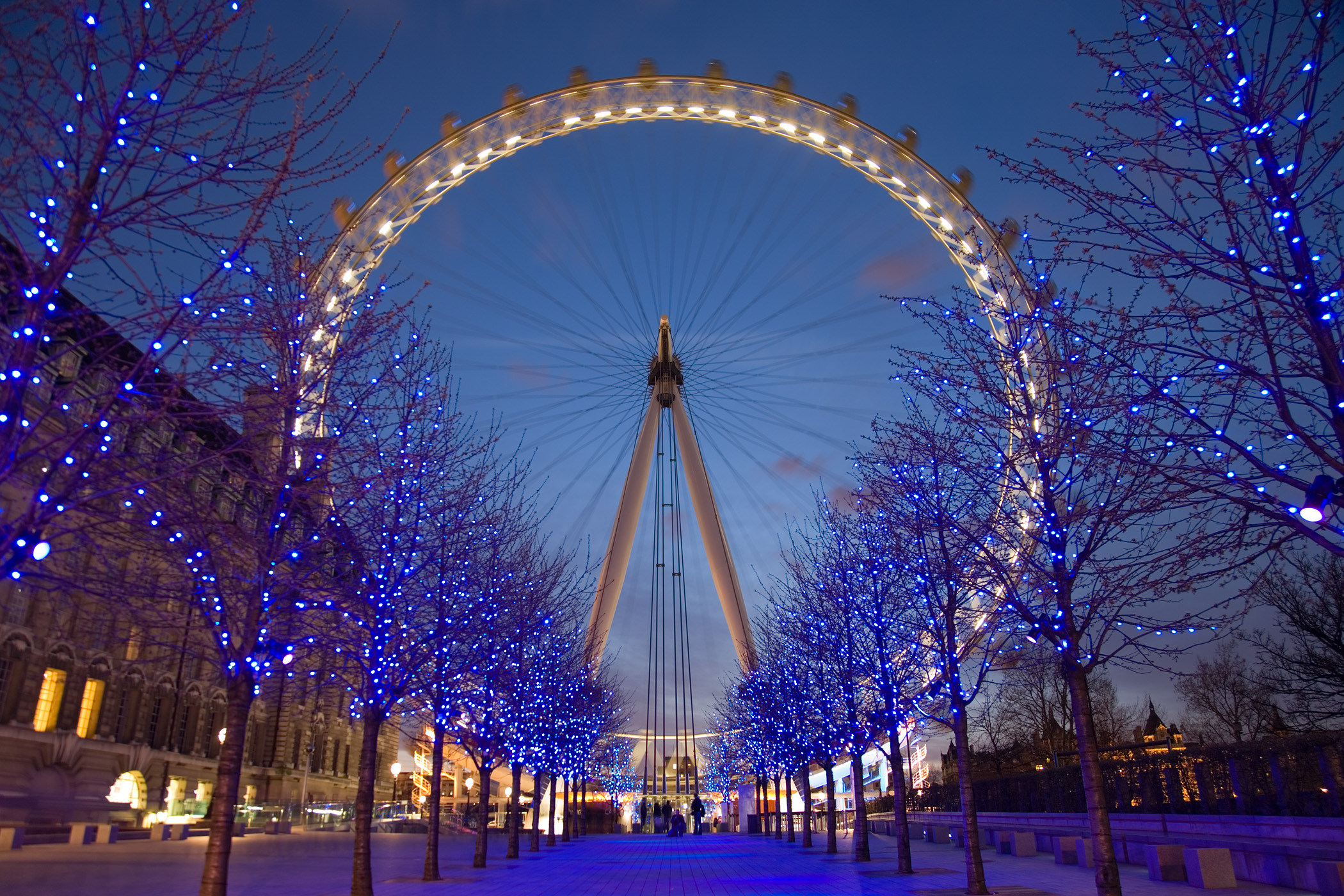
England's famous London Eye ferris wheel

Jerusalem has a clear city brand as a holy city. The holy city includes numerous significant holy sites such as the Western Wall, the Church of the Holy Sepulchre, the Garden Tomb, and the Temple Mount. A study commissioned by the Swedish Research Council suggests that Jerusalem may be one of the oldest city brands, having undergone organic branding campaigns for centuries. Pilgrimage, the religious equivalent of tourism, has been part of Jerusalem's history for millennia.

Las Vegas or simply Vegas is used by the Las Vegas Convention and Visitors Authority as a brand to market the bulk of the Las Vegas Valley, including the Las Vegas Strip, Las Vegas, Nevada, Henderson, Nevada, North Las Vegas, Nevada and parts of Clark County, Nevada. The city has also branded itself as "Sin City."

Other examples of urban brands include:

- Abu Ghosh – "world capital of hummus"
- New York City – "I Love New York"
- Paris – "Illuminated City"
- Seattle "Emerald City"

== Examples of successful place branding campaigns ==
Estonia is a strong example of impactful place branding. Following the nation's restored independence in 1991, Estonia has pursued a deliberate strategy to position itself as a digital nation. This positioning is supported by concrete actions, including ensuring that 100% of state services are delivered online and implementing the first Digital Nomad Visa which allows individuals outside of Estonia to establish themselves as an Estonian company and access the EU market from anywhere in the world.

Costa Rica is also pursuing a nation branding strategy to grow awareness of the country's assets outside of its tourism offering. The nation is building a reputation as a world leader in sustainability. This is drawn both from their ecology (more than 6.5% of the world's biodiversity is in Costa Rica and their commitment to green energy.

Both of these nation branding strategies have had considerable success in shaping external perceptions of their respective country, which can be tracked through the growth in related search terms.
