= Nation branding =

Reputation management for countries

Nation branding aims to measure, build and manage the reputation of countries (closely related to place branding). In the book Diplomacy in a Globalizing World: Theories and Practices, the authors define nation branding as "the application of corporate marketing concepts and techniques to countries, in the interests of enhancing their reputation in international relations." Many nations try to make brands in order to build relationships between different actors that are not restricted to nations. It extends to public and private sectors in a nation and helps with nationalism. States also want to participate in multilateral projects. Some approaches applied, such as an increasing importance on the symbolic value of products, have led countries to emphasize their distinctive characteristics. The branding and image of a nation-state "and the successful transference of this image to its exports - is just as important as what they actually produce and sell." This is also referred to as country-of-origin effect.

Nation branding is a developing field in which scholars continue their search for a unified theoretical framework. Many nations are aiming to improve their country's standing, as the image and reputation of a nation can heavily influence its economic vitality. They seek to attract tourism and investment capital, increase exports, attract a talented and creative workforce, and enhance their cultural and political influence in the world. Different ways that nation project their nation brand include export, foreign direct investment, and tourism. One example of exporting products is that Germany is known for their motor industry because famous car companies like Mercedes, Audi, and BMW are all German companies. An example of foreign direct investments that help the nation brand are US companies building maquiladoras and other European countries having factories in different countries.

== In practice ==
Nation branding is practiced by many countries, including the United States, Canada, France, United Kingdom (where it is officially referred to as public diplomacy), Malaysia, Japan, China, South Korea, Singapore, South Africa, Australia, New Zealand, Israel and most Western European countries. An early example of this was the Cool Britannia approach of the early days of the New Labour government (following the Britain (TM) pamphlet by Demos's Mark Leonard), though this has since been replaced by a more credible Public Diplomacy Board. Cool Japan is a newer initiative aimed at promoting Japan's creative industries. There is increasing interest in the concept from poorer states on the grounds that an enhanced image might create more favorable conditions for foreign direct investment, tourism, trade and even political relations with other states. Developing nations such as Tanzania, Colombia and Peru are creating smaller nation branding programs aimed at increased overall image and with the case of Colombia, changing international perception. Nation branding is seen as a part of Sweden's public diplomacy, especially with Brand Sweden. Sweden uses two main institutions, called the Utrikesdepartementet and the Swedish Institute, to study their nation branding. They wanted to present a good image through the press and also collect different reports on Sweden's representations abroad. Different events and campaigns were also made to promote Brand Sweden, one example being the House of Sweden, which was an embassy in the US. Another campaign was the Second House of Sweden, which used the internet to introduce Sweden's embassy virtually. Researchers in Sweden also studied the Nation Brand Index (NBI) results to collect data.

== In academia ==
Nation branding can be approached in academics as a field in social sciences, political sciences, humanities, communication, marketing and international relations. Scholars such as Evan H. Potter at the University of Ottawa have conceptualized nation brands as a form of national soft power. All efforts by government (at any level) to support the nation brand - either directly or indirectly - becomes public diplomacy.

Anti-globalization proponents often claim that globalization diminishes and threatens local diversity, but there is evidence that in order to compete against the backdrop of global cultural homogeneity, nations strive to accentuate and promote local distinctiveness as a competitive advantage.

== Anholt Nation Brands Index ==
The concept of measuring global perceptions of countries across several dimensions (culture, governance, people, exports, tourism, investment and immigration) was developed by Simon Anholt. His original survey, the Anholt Nation Brands Index, was launched in 2005 and fielded four times a year. Today it is fielded and published once a year, named the Anholt Nation Brands Index, using a panel of 40,000 people in 20 countries to monitor the global perceptions of countries. There is also an Anholt-GfK Roper City Brands Index.

== Futurebrand Country Brand Index ==
Futurebrand publishes the Country Brand Index every year, which includes an overall ranking of the 75 countries and rankings by dimension, FutureBrand collected quantitative and qualitative data from Approximately 2,500 opinion-formers and frequent international business or leisure travelers in 17 countries (USA, Canada, Brazil, Argentina, UK, Germany, France, Russia, Turkey, South Africa, UAE, India, China, Thailand, Japan, Mexico and Australia). complete perception dashboards for the top five country brands, regional leaders, and 'ones to watch' for the future. Futurebrand tests a global research sample based on the Hierarchical Decision Model (HDM) which involves determining an individual's awareness, familiarity, association, and preference towards a country's brand. In their 2018-19 ranking, the top 5 nations brands were (ranked from first to fifth) Germany, Switzerland, Japan, Sweden, and Canada.

== See also ==
- Country of origin
- Branding
- Place branding
- Public relations
- Cool Japan
- Cool Britannia
- Presidential Council on Nation Branding, Korea
