= Simon Anholt =

Independent Policy Advisor, Author

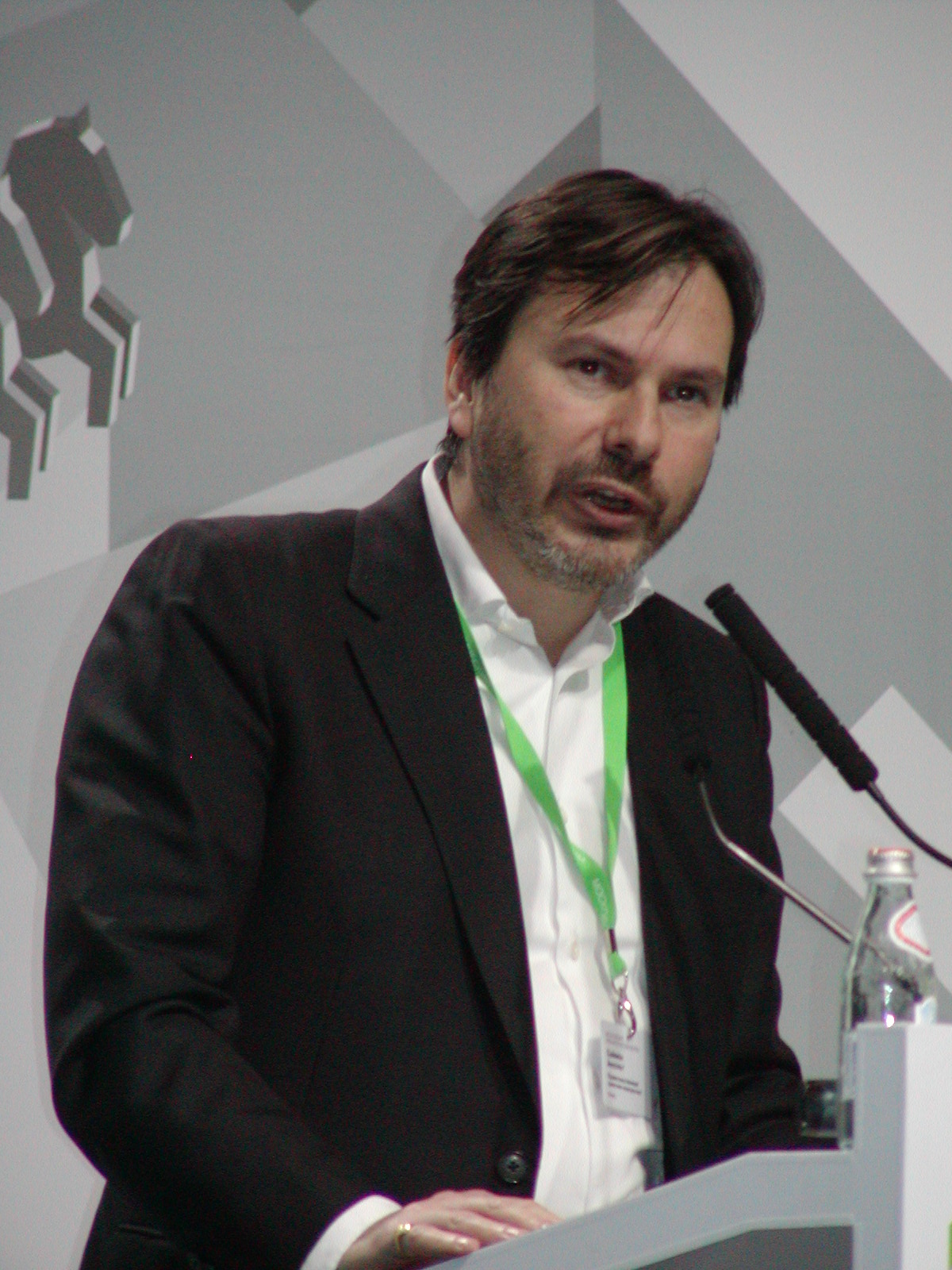
- Occupations: Founder Good Country; the Global Vote; Independent Policy Advisor to Heads of State and CEOs; Speaker; Author & Researcher; Hon. Professor UEA.
- Website: goodcountry.org www.globalvote.org www.simonanholt.com

Simon Anholt is an independent policy advisor who has worked to help develop and implement strategies for enhanced economic, political and cultural engagement with other countries.

He is the founder of the Good Country Index.

Anholt has been called the "founder", "champion" and "instigator" of the Nation Brands and Place Brands terms and field of study and practice.

He is the founder and publisher of the global annual research studies: Anholt-Ipsos Nation Brands Index and Anholt-Ipsos Roper City Brands Index, two major surveys which use a panel of 30,000 people in 25 countries to monitor global perceptions of 50 countries and 50 cities.

He is the author of the book Another One Bites The Grass, and of Brand New Justice covering the role of companies in economic development, first published in 2003. His more recent books include the best seller Brand America, (Cyan Books 2004 and 2009); Competitive Identity (Palgrave Macmillan 2007); Places (Palgrave Macmillan 2010); and The Good Country Equation (Berrett-Koehler 2020).

== Background ==
Anholt was born to British parents. The family was based in the Netherlands until Anholt was five, when they moved to Surrey in south-east England. He attended a boarding school and went on to study social anthropology at Oxford University.

After graduation, Anholt worked for advertisers McCann Erickson on international cultural issues, then launched a firm, World Writers, which offered to advertisers first-language cultural adaptation rather than simply translation.

== Bibliography ==
- Anholt, Simon (2020-08-11). The Good Country Equation: How We Can Repair the World in One Generation. Berrett-Koehler. ISBN 978-1523089611.
- Anholt, Simon (23 January 2010). Places: Identity, Image and Reputation. Palgrave Macmillan. ISBN 978-0-230-23977-7.
- Anholt, Simon (23 January 2007). Competitive Identity: the new brand management for nations, cities and regions. Palgrave Macmillan. ISBN 978-0-230-50028-0.
- Anholt, Simon (2003). Brand New Justice: the upside of global branding (paperback ed.). Oxford: Butterworth-Heinemann. ISBN 0-7506-5699-9.
- Anholt, Simon; Hildreth, Jeremy (1 April 2005). Brand America: The Mother of All Brands. Cyan Communications. ISBN 1-904879-02-0.
- Anholt, Simon (January 2000). Another One Bites the Grass: Making Sense of International Advertising. New York: John Wiley & Sons. ISBN 0-471-35488-0.

== See also ==
- Nation branding
