= Country of origin =

Country of manufacture, production, or growth

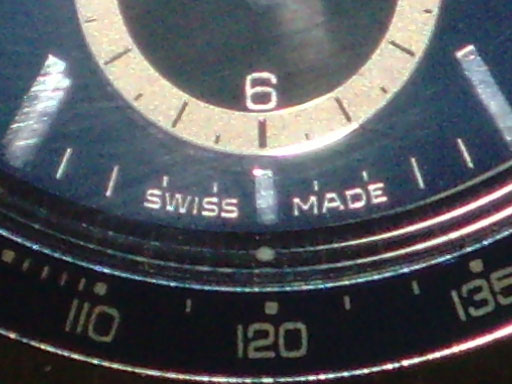
"Swiss Made" label on a TAG Heuer chronograph

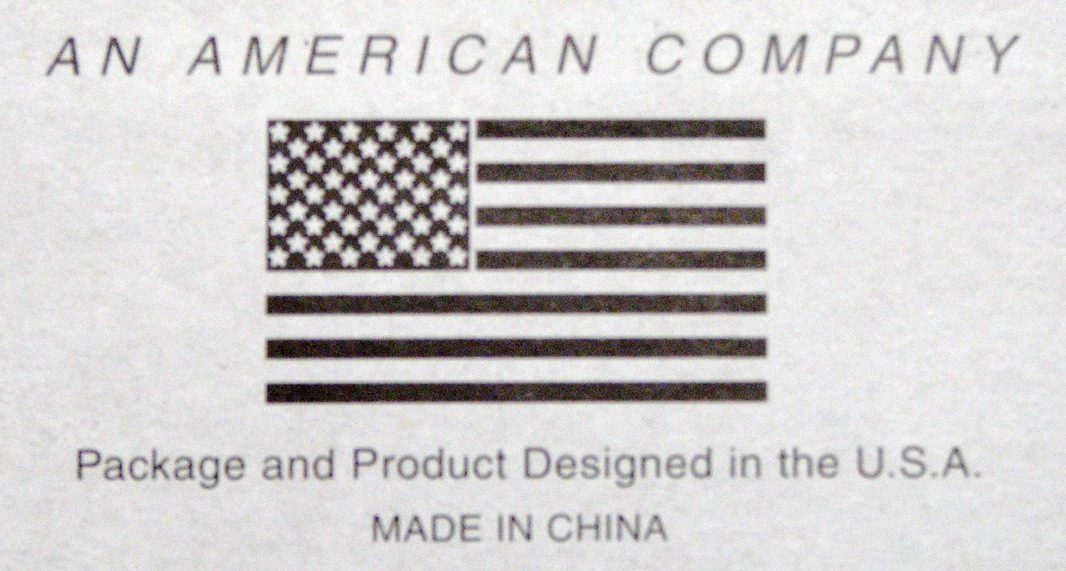
Country of origin label for a product designed in the United States, but manufactured in China

Country of origin (CO) represents the country or countries of manufacture, production, design, or brand origin where an article or product comes from. For multinational brands, CO may include multiple countries within the value-creation process.

There are differing rules of origin under various national laws and international treaties. Country of origin labelling (COL) is also known as place-based branding, the made-in image or the "nationality bias". In some regions or industries, country of origin labelling may adopt unique local terms such as terroir used to describe wine appellations based on the specific region where grapes are grown and wine manufactured.

Place-based branding has a very ancient history. Archaeological evidence points to packaging specifying the place of manufacture dating back to some 4,000 years ago. Over time, informal labels evolved into formal, often regulated labels providing consumers with information about product quality, manufacturer name and place of origin.

== Definition ==
Country of origin of a product can have several possible definitions. It can refer to:

(a) "the place from which the merchandise was directly received; that is the last border crossed or port entered before reaching its final destination;
(b) the country of consignment (i.e. from where the goods were sold); or,
(c) the country of original growth or extraction."

== History of country-of-origin labelling ==
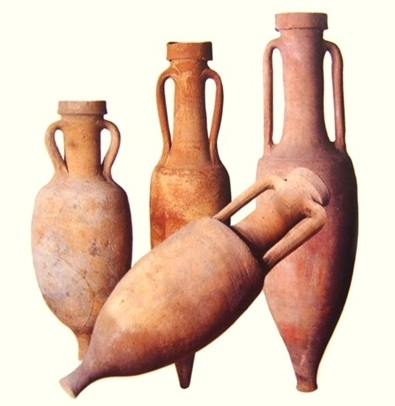
The distinctive shape and markings on amphorae provided consumers with information about the manufacturer and the place of origin for goods.

The inclusion of place of origin on manufactured goods has an ancient history. In antiquity, informal branding which included details such as the name of manufacturer and place of origin were used by consumers as important clues as to product quality. David Wengrow has found archaeological evidence of brands, which often included origin of manufacture, dating to around 4,000 years ago. Producers began by attaching simple stone seals to products. Over time, these seals were transformed into clay seals with impressed images, often associated to the producer's personal identity. This provided information about the product and its quality. For instance, an object found in a royal burial tomb in Abydos (southern Egypt) and dating to around 3000 BCE, carries brand elements that would be very familiar to modern consumers. Inscriptions on the surface denote a specific place of manufacture, "finest oil of Tjehenu", a region in modern-day Libya.

In China, place-names appear to have developed independently during the Han dynasty (220 BCE–200 CE); brand names and place names were relatively commonplace on goods. Eckhardt and Bengtsson have argued that in the absence of a capitalist system, branding was connected to social systems and cultural contexts; that brand development was a consumer-initiated activity rather than the manufacturer-push normally associated with Western brand management practices.

Diana Twede has shown that amphorae used in Mediterranean trade between 1500 and 500 BCE exhibited a wide variety of shapes and markings, which provided information for purchasers during exchange. Systematic use of stamped labels dates appears to date from around the fourth century BCE. In a largely pre-literate society, the shape of the amphora and its pictorial markings functioned as a brand, conveying information about the contents, region of origin and even the identity of the producer which were understood to function as signs of product quality.

The Romans preferred to purchase goods from specific places, such as oysters from Londinium and cinnamon from a specific mountain in Arabia, and these place-based preferences stimulated trade throughout Europe and the Middle East. In Pompeii and nearby Herculaneum, archaeological evidence also points to evidence of branding and labelling in relatively common use. Wine jars, for example, were stamped with names, such as "Lassius" and "L. Eumachius", probably references to the name of the producer. Carbonized loaves of bread, found at Herculaneum, indicate that some bakers stamped their bread with the producer's name.

Umbricius Scauras, a manufacturer of fish sauce (also known as garum) in Pompeii c. 35 CE, was branding his amphora which travelled across the entire Mediterranean. Mosaic patterns in the atrium of his house were decorated with images of amphora bearing his personal brand and quality claims. The mosaic comprises four different amphora, one at each corner of the atrium, and bearing labels as follows:

1. G(ari) F(los) SCO[m]/ SCAURI/ EX OFFI[ci]/NA SCAU/RI Translated as "The flower of garum, made of the mackerel, a product of Scaurus, from the shop of Scaurus"
2. LIQU[minis]/ FLOS Translated as: "The flower of Liquamen"
3. G[ari] F[los] SCOM[bri]/ SCAURI Translated as: "The flower of garum, made of the mackerel, a product of Scaurus"
4. LIQUAMEN/ OPTIMUM/ EX OFFICI[n]/A SCAURI Translated as: "The best liquamen, from the shop of Scaurus"

Scauras' fish sauce was known to be of very high quality across the Mediterranean and its reputation travelled as far away as modern France.

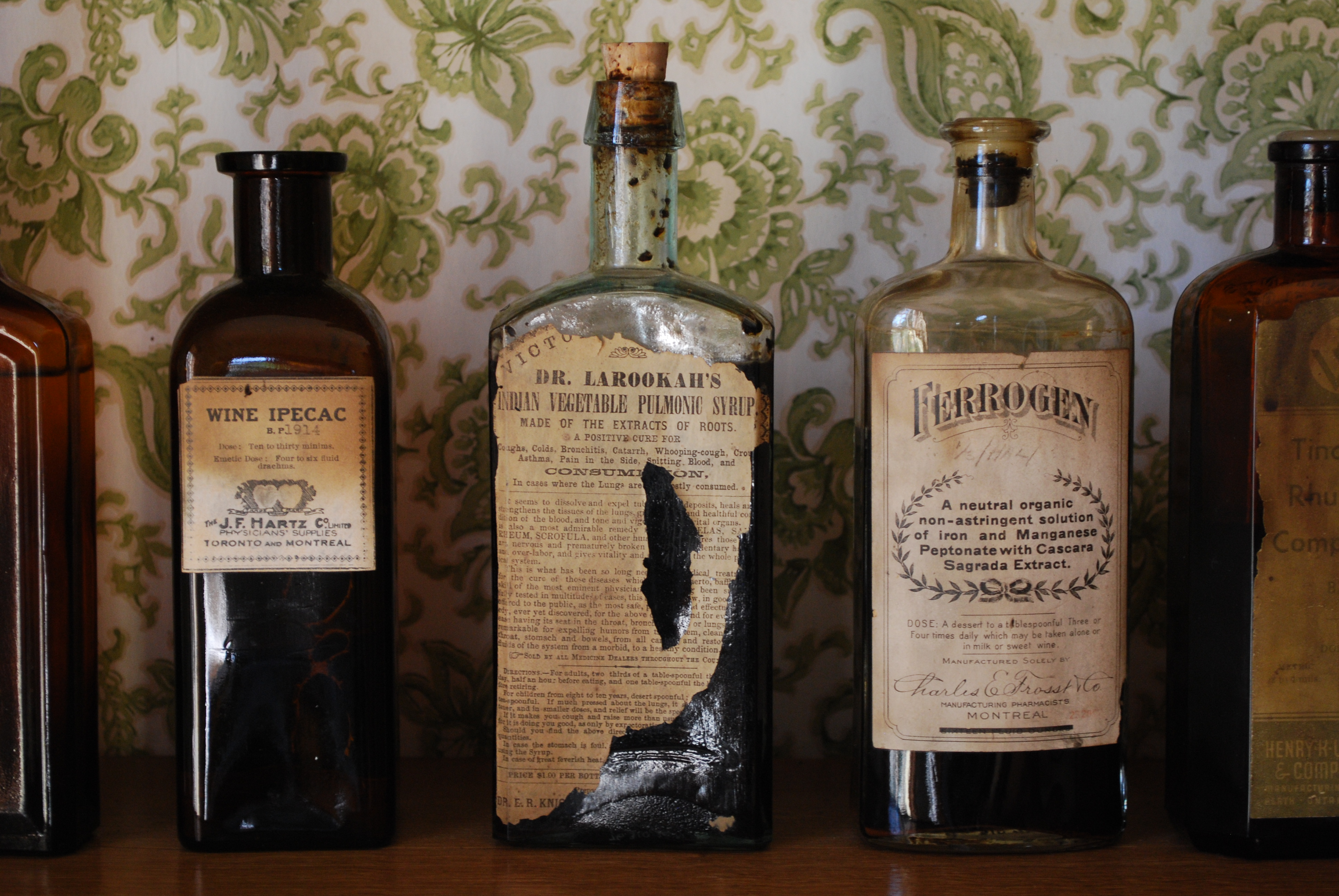
By the 19th century, formal labels featuring manufacturer name and place of manufacture had become relatively common. Picture Apothecary bottles, c. 1860

During the medieval period in Europe, numerous market towns sprang up and competition between them intensified. In response to competitive pressures, towns began investing in developing a reputation for quality produce, efficient market regulation and good amenities for visitors. By the thirteenth century, English counties with important textile industries were investing in purpose built halls for the sale of cloth. London's Blackwell Hall became a centre for cloth, Bristol became associated with a particular type of cloth known as Bristol red, Stroud was known for producing fine woollen cloth, the town of Worsted became synonymous with a type of yarn; Banbury and Essex were strongly associated with cheeses. Casson and Lee have argued that the chartered markets of England and Europe in medieval times were using the regional market's reputation as a sign of produce quality and that this acted as an early form of branding.

Following the European age of expansion, goods were imported from afar. Marco Polo, for example, wrote about silk from China and spices from India. Consumers began to associate specific countries with merchandise - calico cloth from India, porcelain, silk and tea from China, spices from India and South-East Asia and tobacco, sugar, rum and coffee from the New World.

By the late 19th century, European countries began introducing country of origin labelling legislation. In the 20th century, as markets became more global and trade barriers removed, consumers had access to a broader range of goods from almost anywhere in the world. Country of origin is an important consideration in purchase decision-making.

== Effects on consumers ==
The effects of country of origin labeling on consumer purchasing have been extensively studied. The country of origin effect is also known as the "made-in image" and the "nationality bias."

Research shows that consumers' broad general perceptions of a country, including of its national characteristics, economic and political background, history, traditions, and representative products, combine to create an overall image or stereotype that is then attached to the products of that country or countries, as occurs for multinational brands.

For example, a global survey carried out by Nielsen reported that country-of-origin image has a significant influence on consumer perceptions and behaviours, and, in situations in which additional information is unavailable or difficult to get, can be the sole determinant of whether or not someone buys a product. Its effect is strongest on consumers who do not know much about the product or product type and weakest on consumers who are well-informed. Sensitivity to country of origin varies by product category. It is strongest for durable goods and luxury goods and weakest for "low involvement" product categories such as shampoo and candy. In various studies, it has also been proven that the country-of-origin effect also applies to services. Of particular interest is the country image effect on prices in the sense that price allows for the "monetization" of the country of origin cue. The country image effects on product prices reveal the extent to which consumer perceptions of different country images are reflected in willingness to pay for products associated with different countries.

Several studies have shown that consumers tend to have a relative preference for products from their own country or may have a relative preference for or aversion against products that originate from certain countries (so-called affinity and animosity countries).

== Labelling requirements ==
The requirements for Country of Origin markings are complicated by the various designations which may be required such as "Made in X", "Product of X", "Manufactured in X" etc. They also vary by country of import and export. For example:

- For imports to the United Kingdom, there is a voluntary code for food. Other products are not subject to labelling requirements, but misleading labelling can result in prosecution under the Trade Descriptions Act 1968.
- Food exported to the United Arab Emirates must include Country of Origin.
- Country of Origin markings have been mandatory in Japan since 1962 and in China since 2005.
- The UK's Federation of Private Business has argued that the absence in the European Union of any mandatory marking rules "puts European citizens at a disadvantage".

=== United States ===
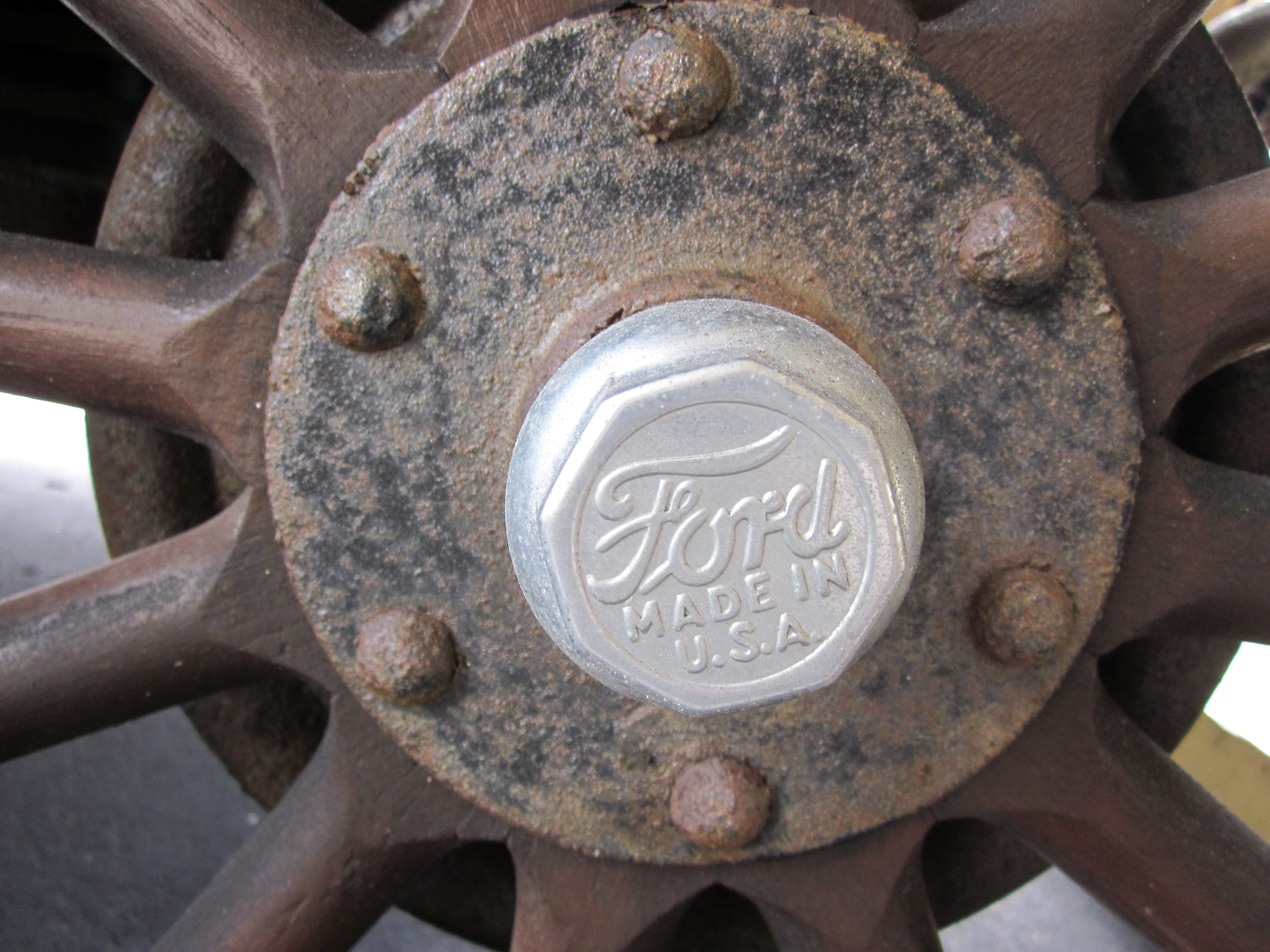
Ford automobile hubcap with Made in U.S.A. imprint

Section 304 of the Tariff Act of 1930 as amended (19 U.S.C. § 1304) requires most imports, including many food items, to bear labels informing the ultimate purchaser of their country of origin. Meats, produce, and several other raw agricultural products generally were exempt. The 2002 farm bill (P.L. 107–171, Sec. 10816), however, contains a requirement that many retail establishments provide, starting on September 30, 2004, country-of-origin information on fresh fruits and vegetables, red meats, seafood, and peanuts. However, the consolidated FY2004 appropriation (P.L. 108–199) signed January 23, 2004, delayed this requirement for two years except for seafood.

The 1933 Buy American Act requires that a product be manufactured in the U.S. of more than 50 percent U.S. parts to be considered Made in USA for government procurement purposes. For more information, review the Buy American Act at 41 U.S.C. §§ 10a-10c, the Federal Acquisition Regulations at 48 C.F.R. Part 25, and the Trade Agreements Act at 19 U.S.C. §§ 2501–2582.

The 1946 Lanham Act gives any person (such as a competitor) who is damaged by a false designation of origin the right to sue the party making the false claim.

The 1958 Textile Fiber Products Identification Act, approved on 2 September 1958, and the 1939 Wool Products Labeling Act require a Made in USA label on clothing and other textile or wool household products if the final product is manufactured in the U.S. of fabric that is manufactured in the U.S., regardless of where materials earlier in the manufacturing process (for example, the yarn and fiber) came from. Textile products that are imported must be labeled as required by the Customs Service. A textile or wool product partially manufactured in the U.S. and partially manufactured in another country must be labeled to show both foreign and domestic processing. On a garment with a neck, the country of origin must be disclosed on the front of a label attached to the inside center of the neck, either midway between the shoulder seams or very near another label attached to the inside center of the neck. On a garment without a neck and on other kinds of textile products, the country of origin must appear on a conspicuous and readily accessible label on the inside or outside of the product. Catalogs and other mail order promotional materials for textile and wool products, including those disseminated on the Internet, must disclose whether a product is made in the U.S., imported, or both.

The 1994 American Automobile Labeling Act requires that each automobile manufactured on or after October 1, 1994, for sale in the U.S. bear a label disclosing where the car was assembled, the percentage of equipment that originated in the U.S. and Canada, and the country of origin of the engine and transmission. Any representation that a car marketer makes that is required by the AALA is exempt from the commission's policy. When a company makes claims in advertising or promotional materials that go beyond the AALA requirements, it will be held to the commission's standard.

The 2010 Fur Products Labeling Act requires the country of origin of imported furs to be disclosed on all labels and in all advertising.

The mandatory country-of-origin labeling of food sold in the United States (mCOOL) rule was defeated by Canada at the WTO in 2014–2015.

== Marketing strategies ==
Companies may indicate the origin of their products with a number of different marketing strategies:

- Use of the phrase "Made in..."
- Use of quality and origin labels
- CO embedded in the company name
- Typical CO words embedded in the company name
- Use of the CO language
- Use of famous or stereotypical people from the CO
- Use of CO flags and symbols
- Use of typical landscapes or famous buildings from the CO

== International trade ==
When shipping products from one country to another, the products may have to be marked with country of origin, and the country of origin will generally be required to be indicated in the export/import documents and governmental submissions. Country of origin will affect its admissibility, the rate of duty, its entitlement to special duty or trade preference programs, antidumping, and government procurement.

Today, many products are an outcome of a large number of parts and pieces that come from many different countries, and that may then be assembled together in a third country. In these cases, it is hard to know exactly what is the country of origin, and different rules apply as to how to determine their "correct" country of origin. Generally, articles only change their country of origin if the work or material added to an article in the second country constitutes a substantial transformation, or, the article changes its name, tariff code, character or use (for instance from wheel to car). Value added in the second country may also be an issue.

In principle, the substantial transformation of a product is intended as a change in the harmonized system coding. For example, a rough commodity sold from country A to country B, than subjected of a transformation in country B, which sells the final processed commodity to a country C is considered a sufficient step to label the end product made in B.

== Film and television production ==
The International Federation of Film Archives defines the country of origin as the "country of the principal offices of the production company or individual by whom the moving image work was made". No consistent reference or definition exists. Sources include the item itself, accompanying material (e.g. scripts, shot lists, production records, publicity material, inventory lists, synopses etc.), the container (if not an integral part of the piece), or other sources (standard and special moving image reference tools). In law, definitions of "country of origin" and related terms are defined differently in different jurisdictions. The European Union, Canada, and the United States have different definitions for a variety of reasons, including tax treatment, advertising regulations, distribution; even within the European Union, different member states have different legislation. As a result, an individual work can have multiple countries as its "country of origin", and may even have different countries recognized as originating places for the purpose of different legal jurisdictions. Under copyright law in the United States and other signatories of the Berne Convention, "country of origin" is defined in an inclusive way to ensure the protection of intellectual rights of writers and creators.

== Digital products and country of origin ==
The concept of country of origin (CO) historically applies to tangible goods, yet it is increasingly invoked for digital products whose composite hardware, software and data make provenance difficult to establish.

Government measures such as the United Kingdom's advisory against Kaspersky anti‑virus on sensitive networks and United States export restrictions affecting Huawei's Android devices illustrate cybersecurity risks linked to foreign‑developed technologies. Debate on digital sovereignty intensified after Russia's 2022 invasion of Ukraine and rising tensions in the Taiwan Strait.

In April 2025 the United States announced so‑called ‘‘Liberation Day’’ tariffs—higher duties intended to encourage domestic manufacture of certain digital goods.

=== Digital Product Domesticity (DPD) framework ===
Ozdemir et al. (2023) propose a 19‑parameter Digital Product Domesticity (DPD) framework that operationalises CO for products combining hardware, software, embedded systems and data sources, providing a multifaceted approach to understanding and controlling the origins of technology. The parameters—derived from interviews and a survey of public‑ and private‑sector stakeholders—were piloted on smartphone imports to Türkiye. Systematic CO assessments can enhance national cybersecurity policy, bolster local digital technology production, and increase supply chain transparency, according to the authors.

Proposed parameters for evaluating the digital CO (summary) adapted from Ozdemir et al. 2023
Category / influence	Illustrative parameters
Hardware	Production place; assembly place; origin of strategic parts; raw‑material or spare‑part content; energy‑source origin
Software production	Domestic development rate; nationality of project team; compliance with export standards; software‑library origin
Digitalisation platforms	Hosting location (website / intranet / cloud); data‑storage location; open‑source code ratio; communication‑infrastructure origin; operating‑system origin
IT outsourcing	Supplier production site; supplier headquarters; source‑code analysis origin; data‑security‑test nationality
Producer	Manufacturer headquarters; domestic‑capital ratio; corporate‑tax contribution; employment and R&D spending

== See also ==
- Technology sovereignty
- Trade war
- Security by design
- Branding
- Brand management
- CE marking
- History of marketing
- History of brand management
- Protected Geographical Status
- Nation branding
