= Textile Fiber Products Identification Act =

Consumer protection act in the United States

Federal Trade Commission Official Seal

Textile Fiber Products Identification Act is a consumer protection act in the United States. The act protects the interest of producers and consumers by imposing regulations of labelling (the mandatory content disclosure) and advertising of textile products. The act specifies labeling requirements and numerous guidelines for the advertising of textile products that should qualify the compliance in accordance with the directions in the act. The Federal Trade Commission considers any form of misbranding to be illegal. Moreover, it also requires that the commission provide a generic name for each man-made fibre, in particular for those not yet named. "Natural" and "manufactured" fibers were among two major groups classified by the act, which also maintains a list of generic names that is updated with each new entrant.

== Scope ==
The Textile Fiber Products Identification Act concerns all textile fiber products other than wool, which is already governed by the Wool Product Label Number. The law prevents misinformation about the fiber content, misbranding, and any unfair advertising practice and compel to function in a certain way. The act specifies the requirement of textile products such as guidelines about labelling, tagging, Country of origin, fiber designation etc. The act also covers the manufacturers and marketers of the textile products.

== Sections in the act ==
Congress 85th passed this legislation on 2 September 1958, but it came into force in 1960. The act has a number of sections that set out regulations for different segments.

- Section 70 of the act defines various definitions of textile manufacturing and marketing, such as fibre, natural fibres, artificial fibres and many other trade-related ensembles.
- Section 70a of the act is about inadmissibility of misbranding.
- Section 70b of the act stops false advertising practices.
- Section 70c of the act guides about illegality of removal of stamp, tag, label, or other identification.
- Section 70d of the act is emphasis on record keeping.
- Section 70e of the act is all about the enforcements.
- Section 70f of the act refers to the injunction proceedings.
- Section 70g of the act applies exclusion of misbranded textile fiber products.
- Section 70h of the act clarifies about guaranty policy.
- Section 70i of the act lays down criminal penalty.
- Section 70j of the act specify Exemptions.
- Section 70k of the act states application of other laws.

== Terminology ==
The Textile Fiber Products Identification Act provides a set of terminology that defines "what is to be called what" while communicating in the textile product trade.

== Generic names and definitions ==
The law has an important role to play in providing 'generic names' and the definitions of artificial fibers. Newly manufactured fibers are updated in their list. The generic name of the fiber is an essential element of the information required by law and a must to be mentioned when labeling products. The name given to a synthetic fibre is based on its chemical composition. Generic names begin with lowercase letters. Examples include olefin, nylon, and acrylic.

== See also ==
- Country-of-origin effect
- Made in USA
- Buy American Act
- Buy America Act
