= Country-of-origin effect =

Psychological effect

The country-of-origin effect (COE), also known as the made-in image and the nationality bias, is a psychological effect describing how consumers' attitudes, perceptions and purchasing decisions are influenced by products' country of origin labeling, which may refer to where: a brand is based, a product is designed or manufactured, or other forms of value-creation aligned to a country. Since 1965, it has been extensively studied by researchers.

== History and origins ==
Country of origin labelling originated in 1887 when the British government, in an effort to reduce sales of German and other non-English products to English consumers, passed a law requiring products manufactured outside England to be labeled with their country of origin.

=== United States labeling ===
In the United States, the labeling of garments came into law under the Textile Fiber Products Identification Act (TFPIA). The act itself imposes regulations on the advertising and labeling of textile fiber products that are being imported and exported out of the United States. These products are defined in the act as, "any fiber, yarn, or fabric used or intended for use in household textile articles". Household textile articles include "wearing apparel, costumes, draperies, floor coverings, furnishings, and bedding". The goal of the Textile Fiber Product Identification Act is to protect producers and consumers against mislabeling or false advertising about the fiber content of textile fiber products. It wasn't until 1984 that the TFPIA was amended to include items made in The United States stating that they were "Made in U.S.A".

Along with outlining each fiber used within the product, the manufacturer must label country-of-origin information. This information must be readily accessible on garments for quick examination. Garments that include a neck must adhere a label midway between the shoulder seams on the inside center of the neck. Garments or products that do not include a neck must incorporate a country-of-origin label on a visible area on the inner or outer parts of the product.

From the time that the act was introduced, the importing of apparel increased drastically in the United States. While this helped the economy domestically and globally, it also hurt the clothing manufacturing industry in the US. Before the act, 95% of clothing purchased in the US was produced stateside. Now, less than 4% purchased is made within the United States.

In some cases, manufacturing goods on a mass level can require many different suppliers and manufacturers to complete a finished product. More often than not, the tasks associated with completing a finished product do not take place in just one single manufacturer or country. In an article for the Business of Fashion, Solca states that, "Made in disclosures are not required for products traded within the European Union. Even where required, 'Made in' criteria are easy to meet: cost thresholds can be reached with finishing, quality control and packaging, while manufacturing is kept offshore".

== Description and strength ==
Research suggests that country of origin (COO) serves as a cue from which consumers make inferences about product and product attributes. The COO cue triggers a global evaluation of quality, performance, or specific product attributes. Consumers infer attributes to the product based on country stereotype and experiences with products from that country. Hence, a COO cue has become an important information cue for consumers who are exposed to far more internationalized product selection and multinational marketing than ever before. Thereby, the country of origin may even affect consumers' perceptions beyond their conscious control. Research into COO has focused on various issues linking COO with other marketing variables, including consumer nationalism, demographics, hybrid products, brand effects, product quality, price, consumer perceptions, technology sophistication, product features, advertising images, and country images, to measure consumer perceptions and purchasing behavior (Ahmed et al., 2004; Badri, Davis, & Davis, 1995; Hamzaoui & Merunka, 2006).

It has been empirically demonstrated that the COO effect has significant price-related consequences and brands with favorable COO associations are able to charge price premiums, over and above those attributed to observed product differentiation (Saridakis & Baltas, 2016). Country-of-origin effects can also apply to retailers. An analysis of transactions on eBay's U.S., U.K., and global markets found that U.S.-based sellers received price premiums for otherwise homogeneous products and services, with the premiums attributed to country-of-origin equity rather than differences in product quality or trading risk.

The country of origin effect is strongest on older consumers and those who don't know much about the product or product type, and weakest on consumers who are well-informed. Sensitivity to country of origin varies by product category. It is strongest for durable goods and luxury goods and weakest for "low involvement" product categories such as shampoo, candy, light bulbs, toilet paper and athletic shoes. When the countries of design, manufacture and the parent brand are different, research suggests all three matter to consumers, but the country of manufacture may matter most.

Some research suggests that younger consumers care significantly less than older people about country of origin, but other studies resulted in different findings. The research on whether men or women care more about country of origin is also inconclusive.

A U.S. study found American college students more willing to buy a "made in China" teddy bear when it was sold at an American store they believed was benevolent, competent and honest, suggesting that negative country of origin effects may be offset when consumers trust the store selling the product.

== Associations ==
Consumers have a relative preference or aversion for products, depending on the products' country of origin (this is called affinity and animosity).

These dispositions have been organised into an attraction–repulsion framework, which classifies country-related consumer biases according to whether they are directed at the consumer's own country or at a foreign country, and whether they take the form of attraction or repulsion. On this account consumer ethnocentrism denotes attraction toward the domestic country and consumer affinity attraction toward a foreign one, while consumer animosity denotes repulsion from a foreign country and consumer disidentification repulsion from the consumer's own. Consumer disidentification has been found to reduce purchases of domestic products independently of consumer ethnocentrism.

Equivalent constructs have been developed in tourism research, where tourism ethnocentrism describes a preference for domestic tourism and tourism affinity a sympathetic attachment toward a particular foreign destination.

In some countries consumers tend to prefer products made in their own country (also known as consumer ethnocentrism) and in others foreign-made products tend to be preferred. A preference for locally made products has been linked to a collectivist culture, and a preference for foreign-made products is associated with a more individualistic, competitive culture, and also with countries that are less economically developed.

One of the biggest challenges many Asian companies face as they globalise is the perception that Asian brands are inferior. Research in international marketing has proven that country associations do lead to customer bias and this bias depends on how a customer views the image of a country. French wine, German cars, Japanese robots, Colombian coffee, Italian fashion, Singaporean efficiency, Swiss chocolate. Somewhere in our minds, these products and services are associated with particular countries owing to their legacy or culture or lifestyle, which automatically leads us to perceive them as 'premium'. Some brands have even been given foreign names, to create a perceived 'COO' effect. Häagen-Dazs, the US-based ice cream company started by Jewish-Polish immigrants in New York, in 1961, was deliberately given a Scandinavian-sounding name to convey an aura of the old-world traditions and craftsmanship.

Many factors contribute to the country image, including:

- Level of development of the country's economy: most countries with a positive COO effect are highly industrialized, developed countries.
- Extent of technological advancement of a country: the higher the technological capability of a country, the more positive is the COO effect.
- Form of government: the success of capitalism and the resulting market economy around the world has created inherent perceptions (often negative) about countries that do not follow capitalism. A related aspect is the reputation of the government and its corporate governance – how bureaucratic, transparent, corrupt or efficient is a country's government?

Consumers are generally felt to perceive Chinese products as low-quality, and to associate "made in China" labelling with value pricing, unskilled labour and inexpensive materials. In 2007 and 2008 China's reputation suffered worldwide due to product safety institutions in many parts of the world recalling Chinese-made products, such as pet food, toys, toothpaste and lipstick, because of concerns about their quality and safety.

Some products are strongly associated with a particular country, such as (in the Western world) silk with China, spices with India, wine with France, chocolate with Belgium, cars with Germany and electronics with Japan. Such products labeled as originating in that country will benefit from a halo effect, with consumers assuming they are high quality.

Countries that are less economically developed tend to have a negative country image and a negative country-of-origin effect.

Associations vary by country and region. Japan is universally understood to manufacture high-quality products, and yet historical animosity between it and some other Eastern Asian countries may reduce those countries' purchasing of Japanese products. A 1965 study found Guatemalan students gave lower evaluations to products from El Salvador and Costa Rica than to domestic and Mexican products because of a general negative attitude toward people from El Salvador and Guatemala. French consumers avoid buying American products due to animosity towards U.S. politics and perceived U.S. passivity during the French Revolution. Throughout Southeast Asia, Korean goods are very highly valued.

== COO for services ==
With the increasing importance of the service sector, also research has focussed on the influences of COO on service perception. Although not as intensively researched as with products, COO is proven to apply also on Services, e.g. when expecting a higher degree of engineering consulting by a German consultancy firm.

== COO marketing ==
Companies are seeking to communicate the COO and to increase their customer's COO awareness with a number of different strategies:

- Use of the phrase "Made in..."
- Use of quality and origin labels
- COO embedded in the company name
- Typical COO words embedded in the company name
- Use of the COO language
- Use of famous or stereotypical people from the COO
- Use of COO flags and symbols
- Use of typical landscapes or famous buildings from the COO

== Fluctuations ==
Perceptions of countries and their products change over time. Since the late 19th century the German reputation for quality and attention to detail has helped it sell products internationally, but its reputation was significantly damaged during the First World War and Second World War.

== Sources ==
- Agarwal, S./Sikri, S. (1996): Country image: Consumer evaluation of product category extensions, in: International Marketing Review, Vol. 13, No. 4, pp. 23–39.
- Anderson, W.T./Cunningham, W.H. (1972): Gauging Foreign Product Promotion, in: Journal of Advertising Research, Vol. 12, No. 1, pp. 29–34.
- Kuester, Sabine (2012): MKT 401: Strategic Marketing & Marketing in Specific Industry Contexts, University of Mannheim.
- Shimp, T.A./Sharma, S. (1987): Consumer Ethnocentrism: Construction and Validation of the CETSCALE, in: Journal of Marketing Research, Vol. 24, No. 3, pp. 280–289.
- Wood, V.R./Darling, J.R./Siders, M. (1999): Consumer desire to buy and use products in international markets: How to capture it, how to sustain it, in: International Marketing Review, Vol. 16, No. 3, pp. 231–256.
