= World Friends Korea =

- Logo of WFK
- Formation: May 7, 2009
- Website: http://www.worldfriendskorea.or.kr/eng/

World Friends Korea (WFK; Korean: 월드프렌즈코리아) is a South Korean government-run overseas volunteer program that was inaugurated on May 7, 2009. Prior to this program, the South Korean government conducted various types of volunteer programs under three different government ministries. As establishing "World Friends Korea", the government of Korea aims in unifying the different programs under a single overseas volunteer system. The program is similar to the American Peace Corps program.

== Establishment of World Friends Korea ==
=== History of Korea Overseas Volunteers Program ===
Since its establishment in 1990, the Korea Overseas Volunteers Program has sent South Korean citizens to partner countries to share expertise, knowledge, and experience in order to make practical contributions to poverty reduction and sustainable development. More than 18,000 volunteers have served in regions including Asia, Latin America, the Commonwealth of Independent States(CIS), and the Middle East. The different volunteer programs have been administered by the different South Korean government ministries: KOICA Volunteers or KOV (Hangul: KOICA 해외봉사단) by the Ministry of Foreign Affairs and Trade, Korea Internet Volunteers or KIV (Hangul: 해외인터넷청년봉사단) by the Ministry of Public Administration and Security, and Korea University Volunteers or KUV and Korea Techno Peace Corps or TPC (Hangul: 대학생봉사단 및 개도국과학지원단) by the Ministry of Science, Education and technology.

=== Establishment of World Friends Korea ===
In order to enhance effectiveness of the contributions provided by the different overseas volunteer programs and offer a coherent and integrated image of the volunteer program, the South Korean government unified the separate volunteer programs previously operated by three different ministries into a single brand, World Friends Korea. World Friends Korea was named with the hope that the volunteers will become “a friend for those in need around the world.”

The inauguration ceremony of World Friends Korea was held at the Blue House on May 7, 2009. World Friends Korea for the year 2010 was launched on May 12, 2010, with the President's congratulatory address. For 2010 World Friends Korea, Taekwondo Peace Corps (Hangul: 세계태권도평화봉사단) under the Ministry of Culture, Sports and Tourism joined the program as well as retired experts and middle- and long-term advisers' group under the Ministry of Knowledge Economy.

== Vision and objectives ==
=== Objectives ===
The vision statement of WFK is "A Better World through Sharing and Learning". Its objectives are:

- improving the living standards of people in host countries

WFK shares with local residents expertise and know-how.

- strengthening the friendship and mutual understanding between South Korea and host countries

WFK promotes positive images of South Korea through a variety of cultural exchanges.

- helping volunteers fulfill their potential through volunteer activities

WFK cultivates mature global citizens who, being open-minded about multiculturalism in South Korean society, contribute to the co-prosperity of mankind.

== Framework ==
The new WFK framework brings the respective volunteer programs led by different ministries and organizations together under the Office of the Prime Minister. The different volunteer programs are run independently as before but at the same time managed by the newly established "Subcommittee for Overseas Volunteers" within the Office of the Prime Minister. The Subcommittee is in charge of connecting relevant organizations and programs together as well as formulating medium- to long-term strategies.

== Roles and activities ==
=== Linking and building partnership for synergy ===
The most important role for WFK is to connect and coordinate the relevant WFK organizations and their volunteer programs and build partnership so as to produce greater synergies.

To do so, WFK has been restructuring its management system, for example, by improving connections between each program including cooperation in advocacy, recruiting, pre-departure training, in-country support, services for returned volunteers. WFK also cooperates with other donors and volunteer service providers from other countries to keep up with the international developments in various aspects of volunteering.

In addition, WFK coordinates that partner countries and priority sectors of volunteer programs could be chosen in line with South Korean aid policy. WFK focuses on the least developed countries in Asia - in particular ASEAN countries, African and Latin American regions. Its priority sectors are education, health, information technology, and community development. In each sector, volunteers focus on the exchange of technical skills, knowledge, and experience between volunteers and local residents.

WFK Priorities
Education	Health
WFK's largest program sector. Volunteers serving as Korean language teachers, vocational trainers, science, youth development and business instructors.	Volunteers providing maternal and child health care services, nutrition and hygiene messages, organizational support at community clinics, and education on preventing infections and vaccine-preventable diseases.
Information Technology	Community Development
Most open and flexible program. Volunteers providing technical training and support to school systems, ministries, businesses, municipal government offices and computer skill lessons including data processing in educational institutions.	Volunteers conducting community outreach programs and needs assessments to increase food production, improve farming techniques, and build community centers.

=== Being a Gateway for More Diverse Volunteer Opportunities ===
WFK has been providing a wide spectrum of volunteering opportunities from long-time and intensive to short-time and more casual in various areas to as many as are willing to volunteer, presenting more diverse and new volunteer programs.

The most well-known programs are:

- KOICA Volunteer Program (KOV)

Korea Overseas Volunteer Program, which is managed by KOICA, is the core volunteer program of the South Korean government. It has been providing two-year assignments for people between ages 20 ~ 65 to Asia, Africa, Latin America, the CIS, and Middle East (a total of 33 countries) since 1991. A KOV above 50 years old with expertise is called a ‘Senior KOV.’

- Korea ICT Volunteer Program (KIV)

Korea IT Volunteer Program, which is managed by the Korea Agency for Digital Opportunity & Promotion (KADO), has been providing short-term ICT oriented assignments for young people, from 1 month to 1 year in Asia, Africa, Latin America, the CIS, and Europe since 2001.

- Korea University Volunteer Program (KUCSS)

Korea University Volunteer Program, which is managed by Korea University Council for Social Service (KUCSS), has been providing short-term assignments for young people from a few weeks to five months in Asia and the CIS since 1997.

- Korea Techno Peace Corps Program (TPC)

Korea Techno Peace Corps, which is managed by Korea Foundation for International Cooperation of Science and Technology (KICOS), has been providing one-year science and technology oriented assignments in the Asia-Pacific region since 2006.

Recent news says that Taekwondo Peace Corps, Retired experts, and middle- and long-term advisers' Group joined WFK, providing new programs.

=== Increasing engagement with various actors — Public-Private Partnership ===
The central government-funded volunteering programs have been unified as World Friends Korea. As such, WFK has become the focal point that connects public volunteer programs with private.

These days, South Korean NGOs and private sectors are more actively involved in overseas volunteering than before. Corporations are more concerned with Corporate Social Responsibility (CSR) (such as Hyundai's Happy Move Volunteers or SK Group's Sunny Volunteers) and universities are encouraging their students more involved in overseas volunteering.

Considering the importance of civil participation in volunteering, WFK is making a better effort to facilitate great civil involvement, establishing a more favorable environment for the general public to participate in overseas volunteering and coordinate more programs based on public-private partnership.

== Increasing recognition on the value of overseas volunteering ==
WFK sees that it is necessary to change the general negative perception on overseas volunteering and to provide the public with notion, the overseas volunteering is not only a meaningful and productive experience as personal experiences but also a duty as global citizens.

Thus, since its launching, WFK has been making more intensive efforts to raise such recognition on overseas volunteering and draw greater social support through cooperation with the related organizations. Many South Koreans have negative images on overseas volunteering. They believe that national development and domestic volunteering should come first, especially since South Korea experienced great poverty just fifty years ago. To change their minds, WFK is presenting the good examples: overseas volunteering is valuable not only for receiving countries but also for South Korea.

Also as overseas volunteering requires financial and professional commitment, WFK is trying to make a social support system in order for the public to join the programs more easily. As one of the efforts, KOICA, in collaboration with related organizations and other governmental branches, is trying to establish a clause in the existing "Volunteering Act" to oblige public institutions to give voluntary work appropriate recognition as part of current and prospective employees' careers. WFK is also encouraging its partner universities to recognize the overseas volunteering by students as credit.
