= International rankings of Australia =

This is a list of Australia's international rankings on a range of social, economic and other criteria.

== International rankings ==
Note: Below each survey uses a limited number of countries/region's for its assessments, see "Measurement(s)" for number variables.

Organization	Survey	Rank	Measurement(s)/Notes	Year
U.S. News & World Report	Most Transparent Countries	12	Measures government open practices, its trustworthiness and low levels of perceived political corruption in the 80 most developed countries	2022
U.S. News & World Report	Best Countries report	14	Measures adventure, agility, cultural Influence, entrepreneurship, heritage, political and individual freedom, social purpose and quality of life in the 80 most developed countries.	2026
Anholt-Ipsos	Nation branding	7	Measures national competence, governance, immigration and investment, people; exports, tourism and culture in the 50 most developed countries	2025
Fund for Peace	Fragile States Index	5	Measures risk and vulnerability of individuals of 179 countries	2022
U.S. News & World Report	Agility	5	Measures Individuals, businesses and governments adaptability to change in the 80 most developed countries	2022
U.S. News & World Report	Best Countries for Education	5	Measures quality of education in the 80 most developed countries	2026
State of World Liberty Project	State of World Liberty Index	4	Degree of economic and personal freedoms of 183 countries	2021
Organisation for Economic Co-operation and Development	OECD Better Life Index	2	Measures wellbeing, environmental quality, quality of public services and security of the 36 most developed countries:	2020
International Comparisons (OECD)	Social justice	4	Arithmetic average of individual indicators of a "Just society" of the 40 most developed countries:	2020
U.S. News & World Report	Social Purpose	9	Measures social progressiveness, inclusiveness and committed to social justice in the 80 most developed countries	2022
OECD	Tertiary education	1	Based on those 25- to 64-year-olds having completed tertiary education of the 50 most developed countries:	2019
The Economist	Democracy Index	13	Measures pluralism, civil liberties and political culture of 167 countries	2025
United Nations	Good Country Index	11	Measure how much each country contributes to the planet and to the human race, relative to its size (measured in GDP) of 125 countries	2020
Social Progress Imperative	Social Progress Index	6	Measures well-being of a society of 132 countries	2021
The Economist	Global Food Security Index	22	Measures food affordability, availability, quality, safety, sustainability and adaptation of 109 countries	2022
The Heritage Foundation	Index of Economic Freedom	13	Based on the rule of law, government size, regulatory efficiency and open markets of 178 countries	2021
Institute for Economics and Peace	Global Peace Index	20	Measures overall peacefulness of 162 countries	2026
Transparency International	Corruption Perceptions Index	12	Based on public sector corruption of 175 countries & territories	2025
UN Sustainable Development Solutions Network	World Happiness Report	12	Based on (quality of) life factors of 156 countries	2021
Georgetown University	Women, Peace and Security Index	11	Measures women's well-being—inclusion (economic, social, political); justice (formal laws and informal discrimination); and security (at the family, community, and societal levels)	2026
Travel Safe - Abroad	Safest countries Index	15	Measures public safety based on the number of incidents including mugging, drugs, violent crimes, bribery, property crimes, stolen vehicles, religion, and racial tolerance of 163 countries	2022
Theglobaleconomy.com	Public services index	18	Measures quality of public services of 177 countries	2024
International Institute for Management Development	Most competitive economies	17	Economic indicators such as gross domestic product (GDP), unemployment and healthcare / education of the 67 most developed countries	2026
Reporters Without Borders	Press Freedom Index	13	Level of freedom available to journalists of 180 countries	2021
World Economic Forum	Global Competitiveness Index	16	Measures level of prosperity of citizens of 144 economies	2019
Legatum	Prosperity Index	15	Measures wealth, economic growth, education, health, personal well-being, and quality of life of 167 countries	2023
United Nations Development Programme	Human Development Index	5	Based on life expectancy, education, and per capita income of 187 countries. Note: Norway has been ranked the highest sixteen times, Canada eight times, Japan and Iceland twice and Switzerland once. See Human Development Index#Past top countries	2021
World Intellectual Property Organization	Global Innovation Index	20	Measures success in innovation of 139 countries	2026
World Population Foundation	Best Countries To Live	5	Measures equality among genders, literacy, average life expectancy, and financial stability of 146 countries	2022
Yale and Columbia Universities	Environmental Performance Index.	13	Environmental performance of 178 countries	2020
World Bank	Ease of doing business index	14	Regulatory environment of 189 countries	2021

=== Freedom assessments ===
The freedom indices produced by several non-governmental organizations publishes assessments of political rights and civil liberties for countries around the world.

Freedom in the World 2022	2022 Index of Economic Freedom	2022 Press Freedom Index	2021 Democracy Index
Free	Free	Satisfactory situation	Full democracy

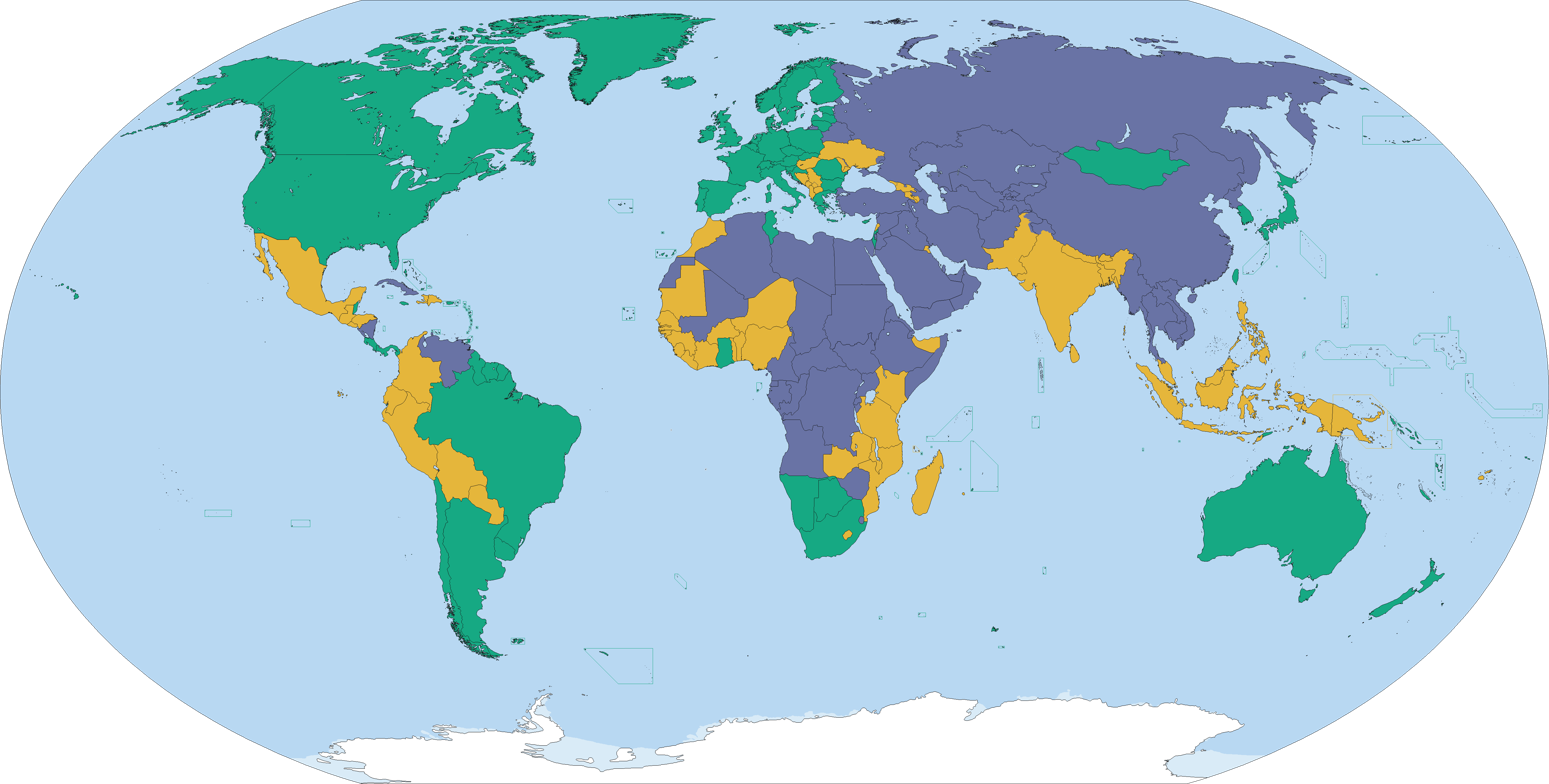
Country ratings from Freedom House's Freedom in the World 2021 survey

2021 Index of Economic Freedom.
Source: The Heritage Foundation and the Wall Street Journal

Press freedom in 2022 according to Reporters Without Borders

Democracy Index map in 2020 according to The Economist Intelligence Unit

Index	Scale				
Freedom in the World	free		partly free		not free
Index of Economic Freedom	free	mostly free	moderately free	mostly unfree	repressed
Press Freedom Index	good situation	satisfactory situation	noticeable problems	difficult situation	very serious situation
Democracy Index	full democracy	flawed democracy	hybrid regime	authoritarian regime	authoritarian regime

== Maps of indices ==
2022 World Happiness Report

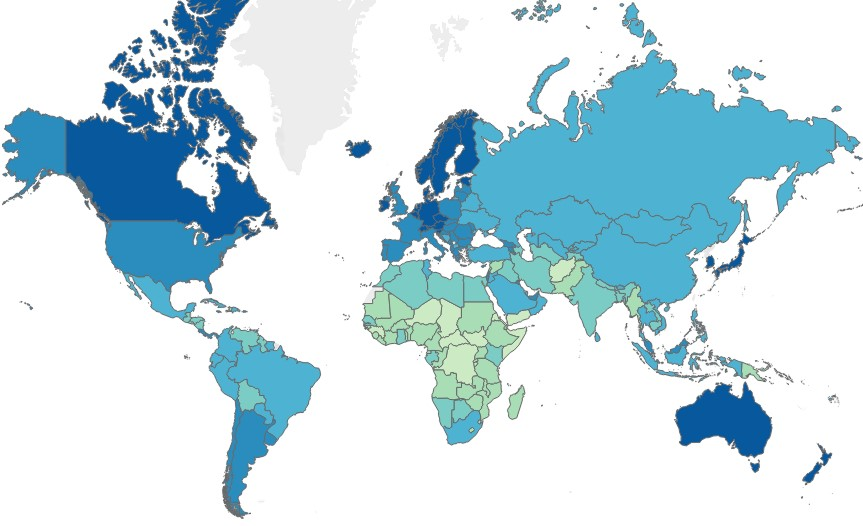
2022 Social Progress Index

Human Development Index 2022

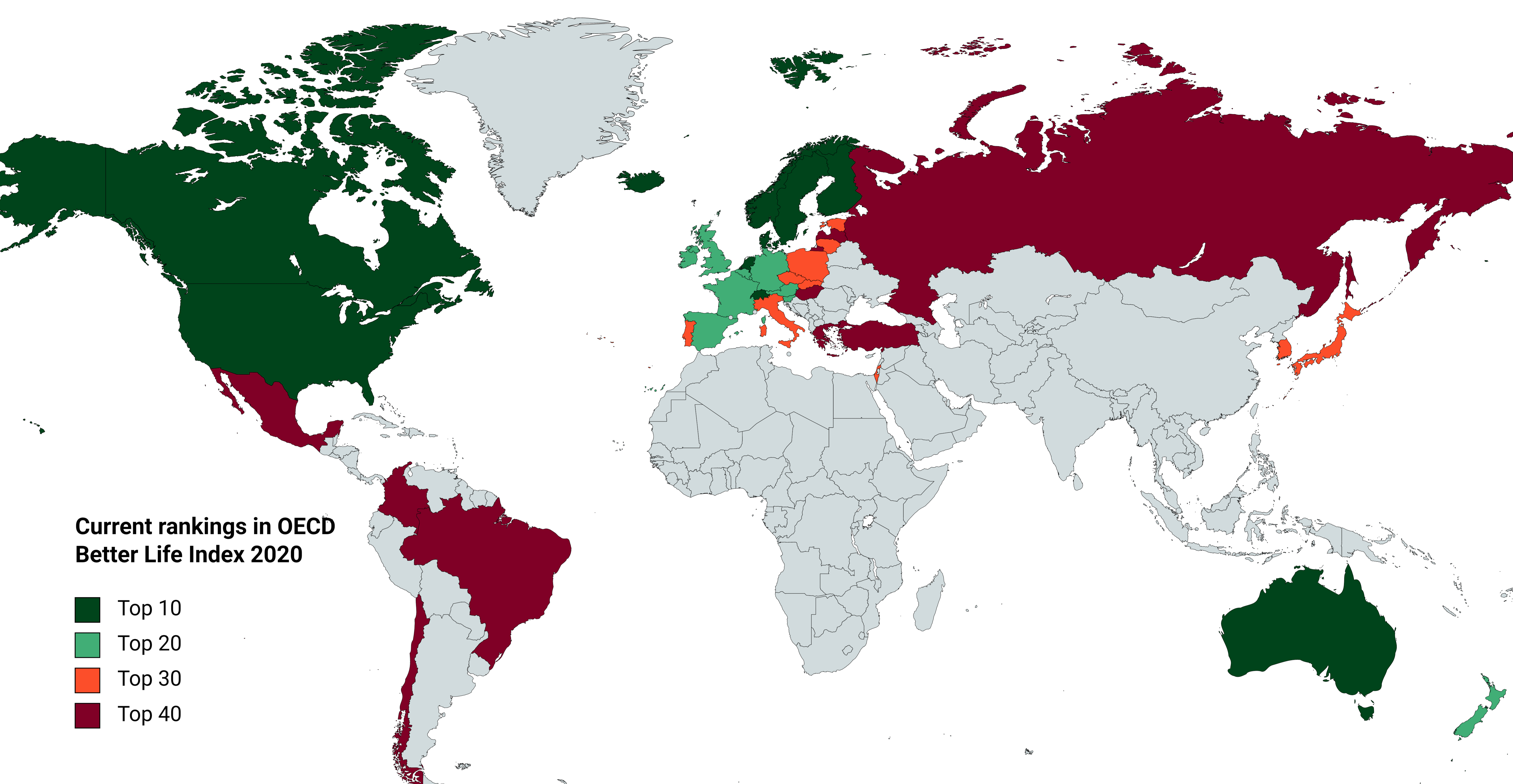
Better Life Index 2020

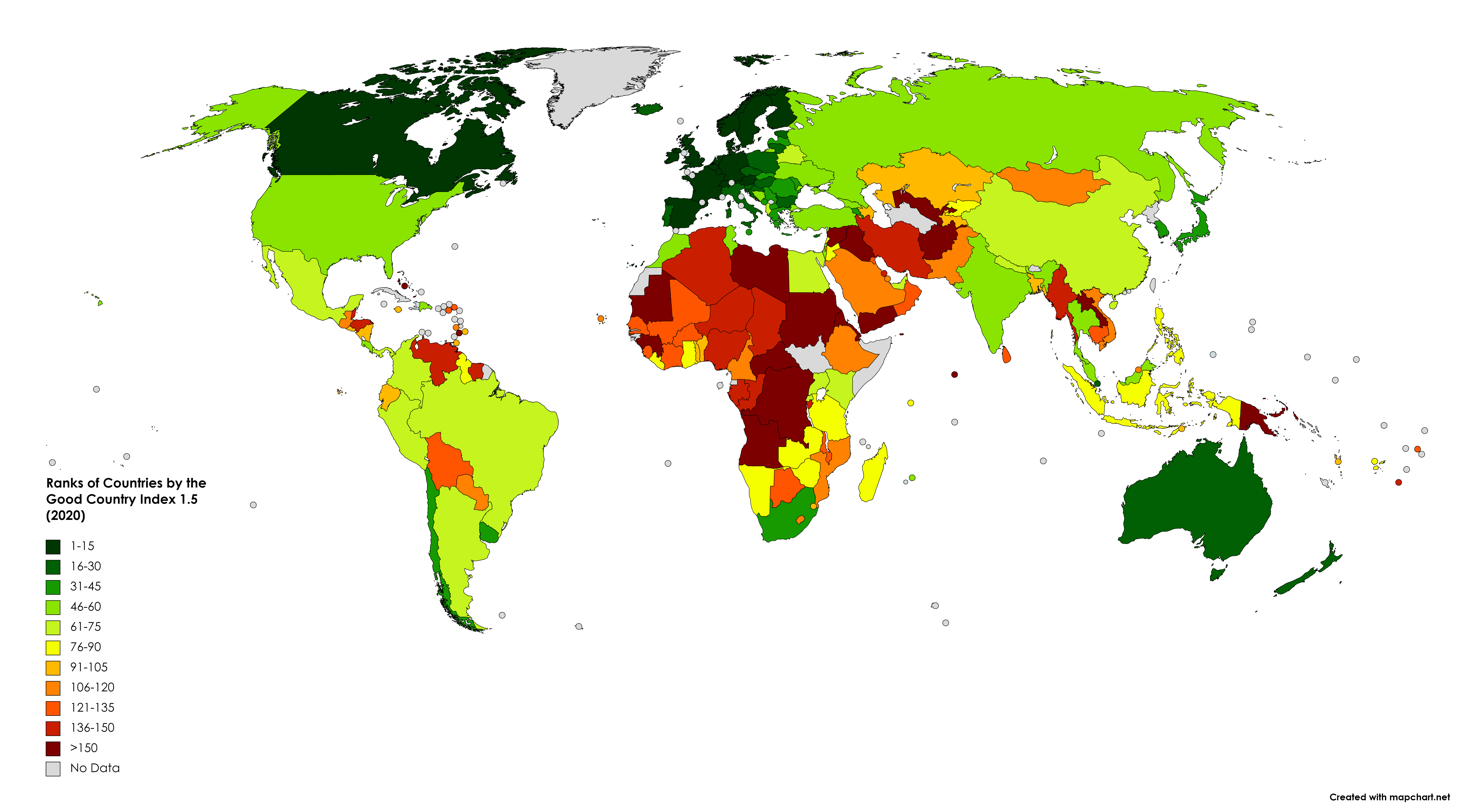
Good Country Index 2020

Global Peace Index 2022

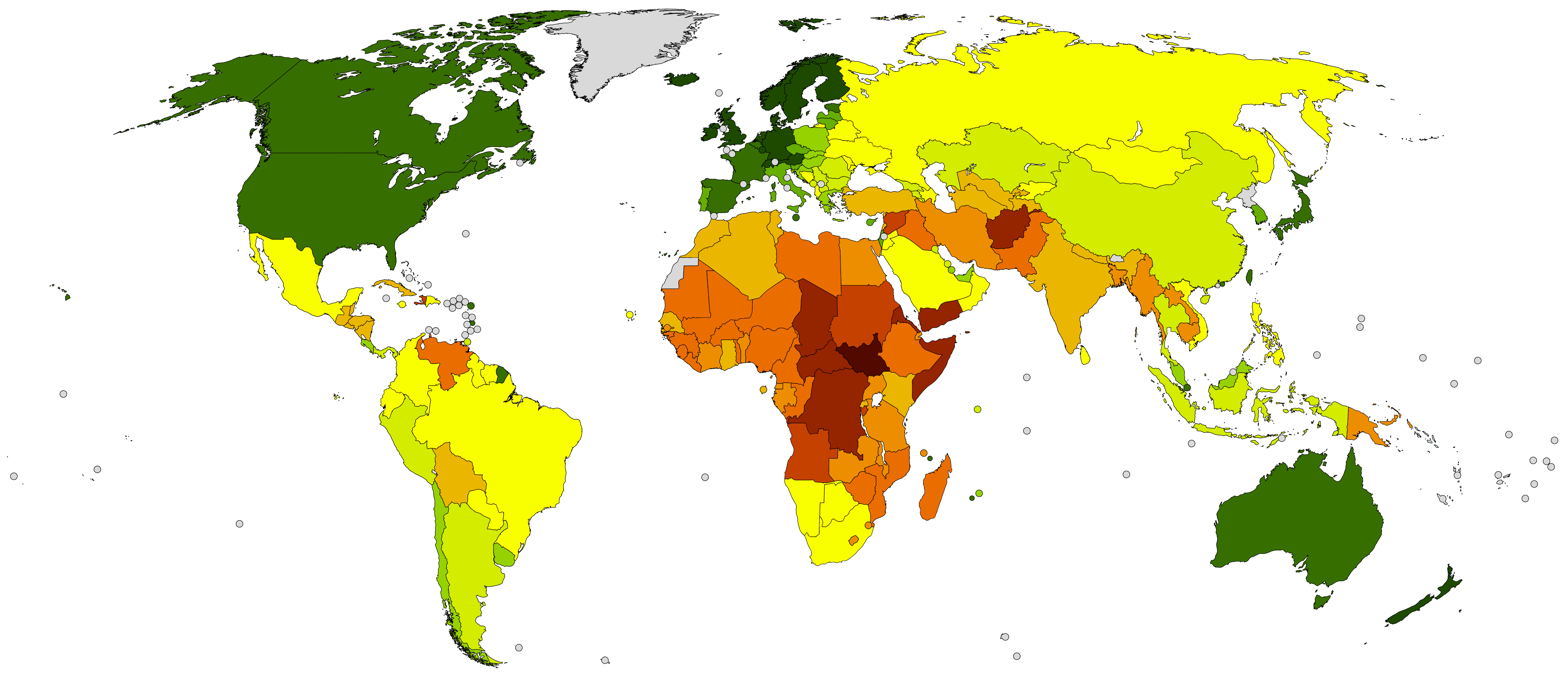
2020 Legatum Prosperity Index

Gender Inequality Index 2020

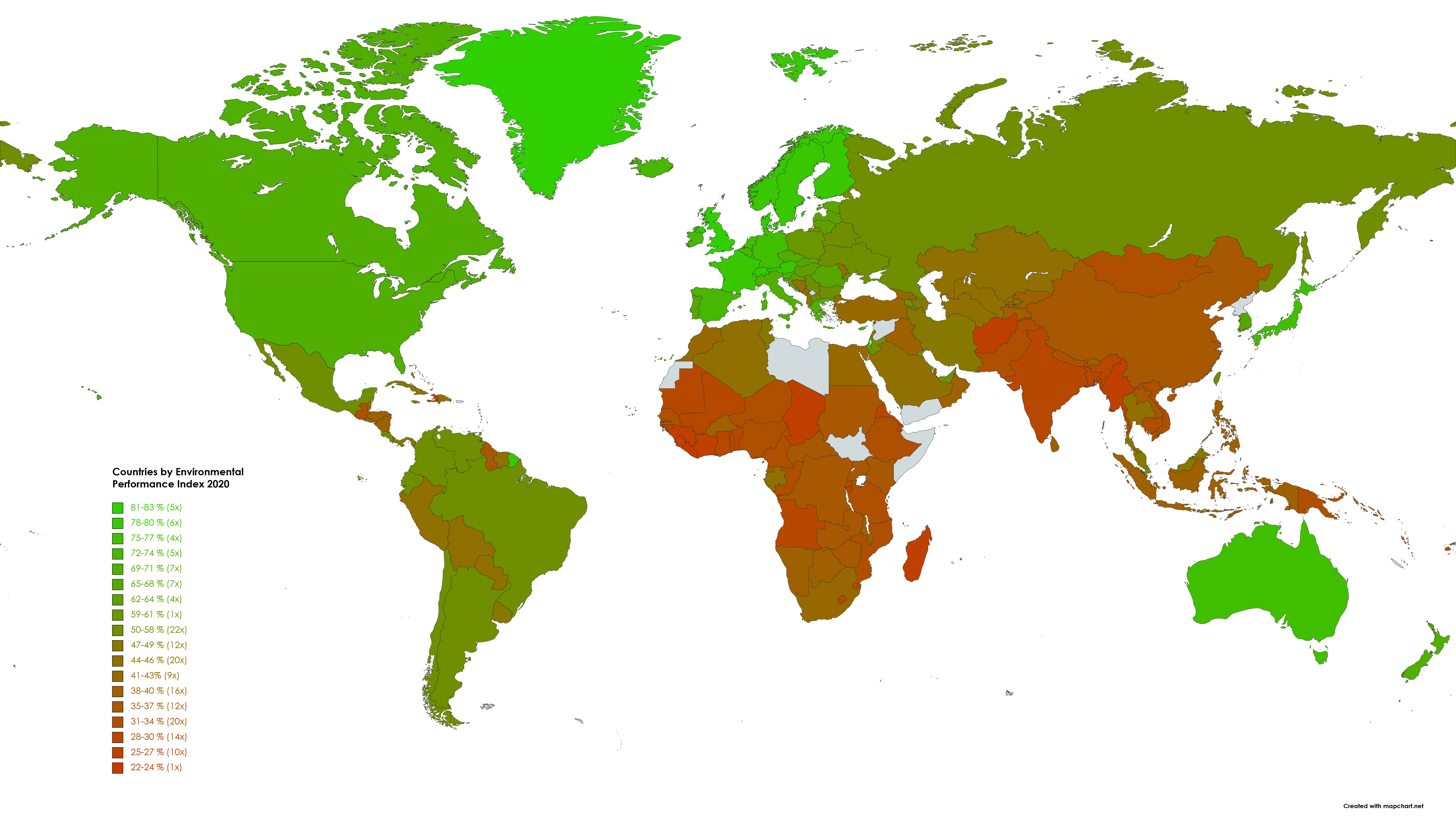
Environmental Performance Index 2020

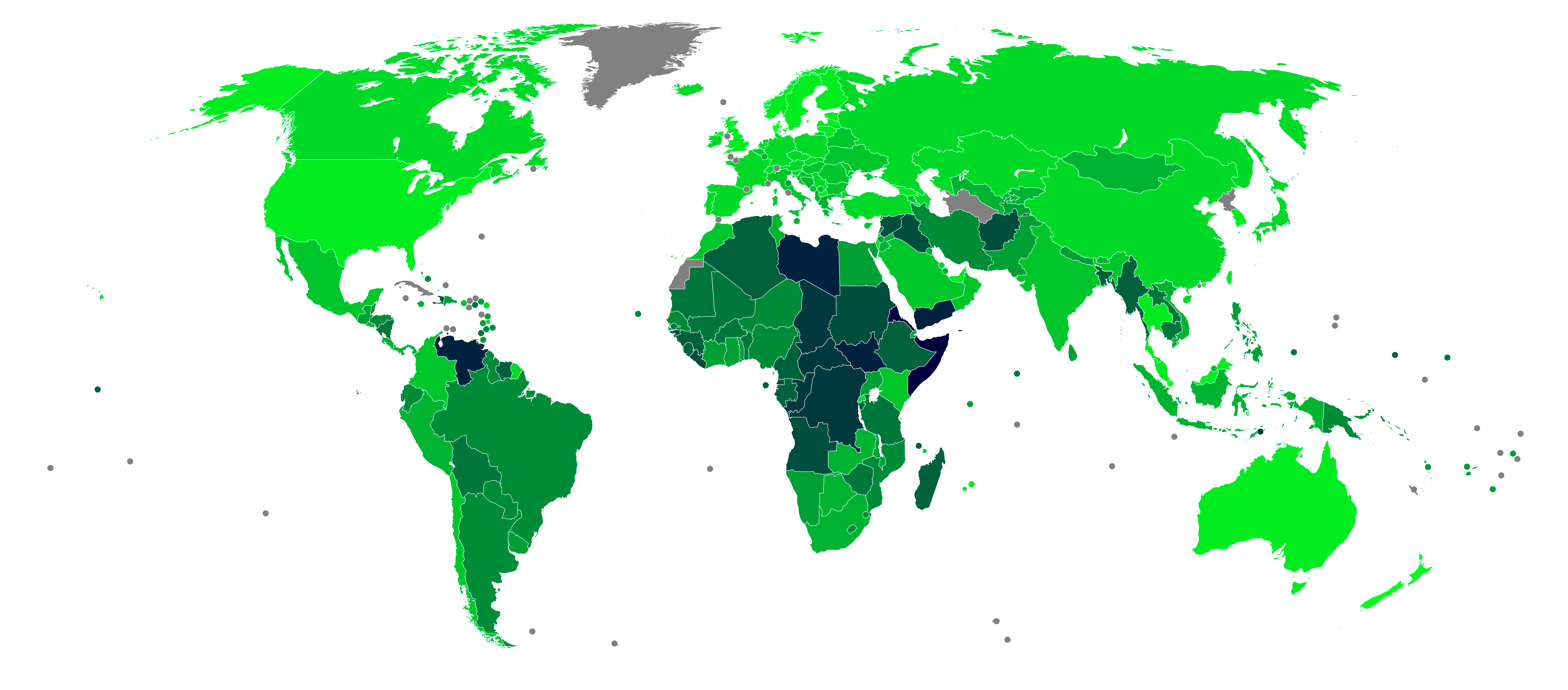
Ease of doing business index 2020

Income inequality Gini index 2020

Infant mortality rates 2019
