= International rankings of Israel =

The following are international rankings of Israel.

== Agriculture ==
- The Economist: Global Food Security Index, ranked 19th out of 113 in 2017

== Economy ==
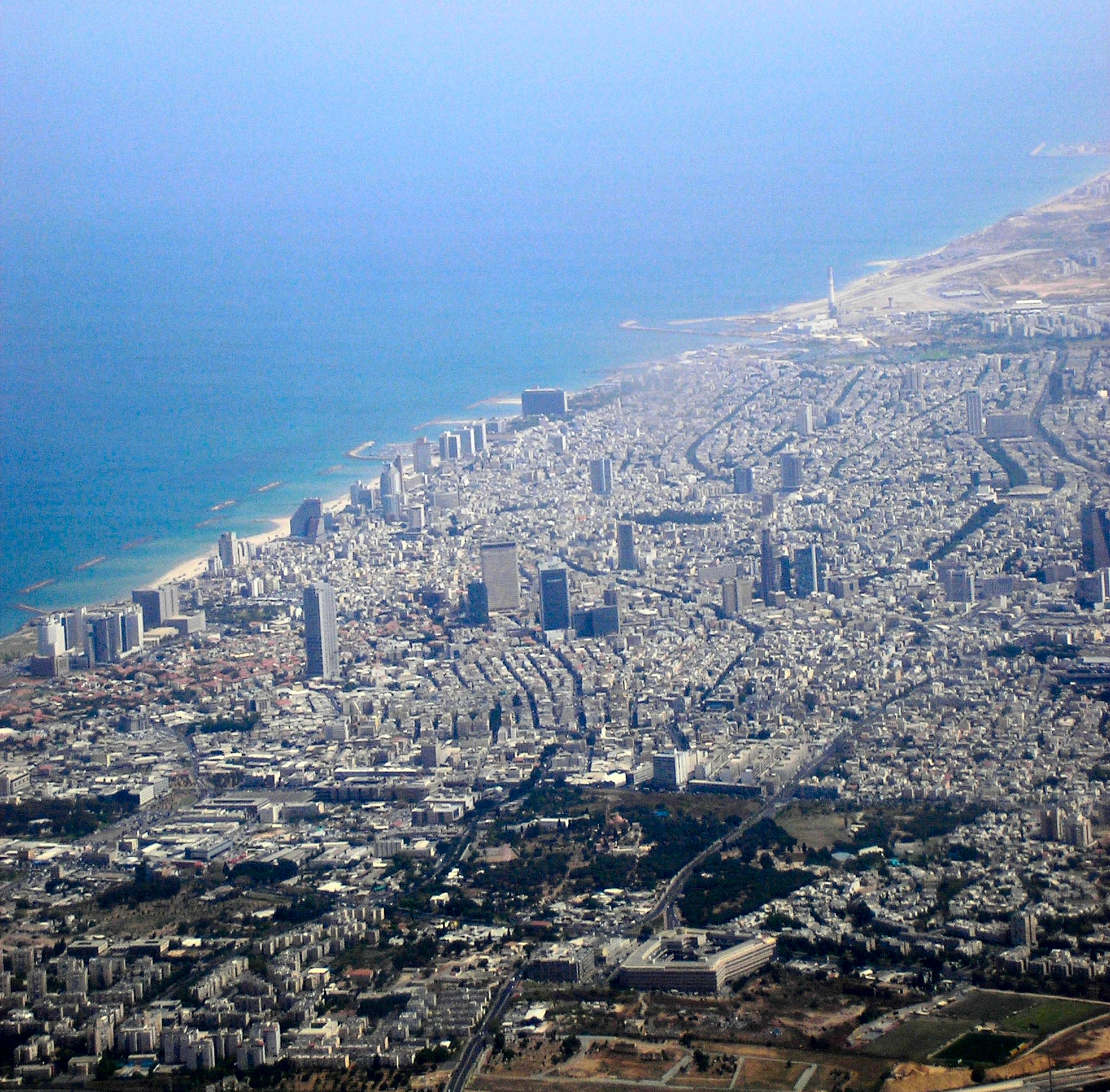
Aerial view of Tel Aviv

- International Monetary Fund: GDP (nominal) 2022, ranked 28th out of 216 countries
- International Monetary Fund: GDP (nominal) per capita 2022, ranked 14th out of 192 countries
- Countries of the World Real GDP (purchasing power parity) 2021, ranked 49th out of 229 countries
- Bloomberg L.P.: Innovation Index 2019, ranked 5th out of 95 countries
- The Wall Street Journal and The Heritage Foundation: Index of Economic Freedom 2022, ranked 43rd out of 177 countries
- World Economic Forum: Global Competitiveness Index 2019: ranked 20th out of 141 countries
- Grant Thornton: Global Dynamism Index 2020, ranked 2nd out of 60
- World Economic Forum: Human Capital Report 2017, ranked 18th out of 130
- World Economic Forum: Inclusive Development Index 2018, ranked 31st out of 103 countries
- World Bank: Ease of doing business index 2020, (2019 rankings), ranked 35th out of 190 countries
- World Bank: Logistics Performance Index 2016, ranked 28th out of 160

== Education ==
- Organisation for Economic Co-operation and Development 2015 Programme for International Student Assessment, ranked 39th of 72 in mathematics, 39th of 72 in science, 37th of 72 in reading. The test does not affect the students' grades.

== Environment ==
- SOPAC: 2012, ranked 210th out of 234 countries
- Yale University/Columbia University: Environmental Performance Index, 2018, ranked 19th out of 180
- Third most dependent in the world on the Population Matters overshoot index after Singapore and Kuwait.

== Free Speech ==
- The Economist: Democracy Index, Freedom of Speech and the Media, ranked a shared 11th place out of 167 countries in the world (9 out of 10 points) in 2017.

== Geography ==
Israel on the world map

- Total area ranked 153rd out of 249 countries (Includes Golan Heights and East Jerusalem, excludes West Bank).

== Globalization ==
- KOF Index of Globalization 2018 (2015 data), ranked 37th out of 185
- Maastricht Globalisation Index 2012, ranked 14th out of 117
- Good Country Index v1.2, ranked 53rd out of 163
- Henley & Partners Passport Index, ranked 23rd out of 104 (or 49 out of 199 countries)

== Human development and society ==
- Human Development Index: 0.919, ranked 25th out of 189.
- Inequality-adjusted Human Development Index: 0.815, ranked 29th out of 152.
- United Nations Development Programme: Human Development Index 2016, ranked 19th out of 188
- World Happiness Report 2022, ranked 9th out of 156
- The Economist: Where-to-be-born Index 2013, ranked 20th out of 80
- State of World Liberty Project: State of World Liberty Index 2016, ranked 54th out of 185
- Global AgeWatch Index 2015, ranked 18th out of 96
- World Economic Forum: Global Gender Gap Report 2017, ranked 44th out of 144
- Legatum Prosperity Index 2017, ranked 38th out of 149
- Y&R BAV Group, Best Countries Report 2018, ranked 30th out of 80
- Social Progress Index 2017, ranked 29th out of 128
- OECD Better Life Index 2017, ranked 24th out of 38

== Media ==
- Reporters Without Borders: 2016 Press Freedom Index, ranked 101st out of 180 national entities (includes Israeli-controlled territories)

== Military ==
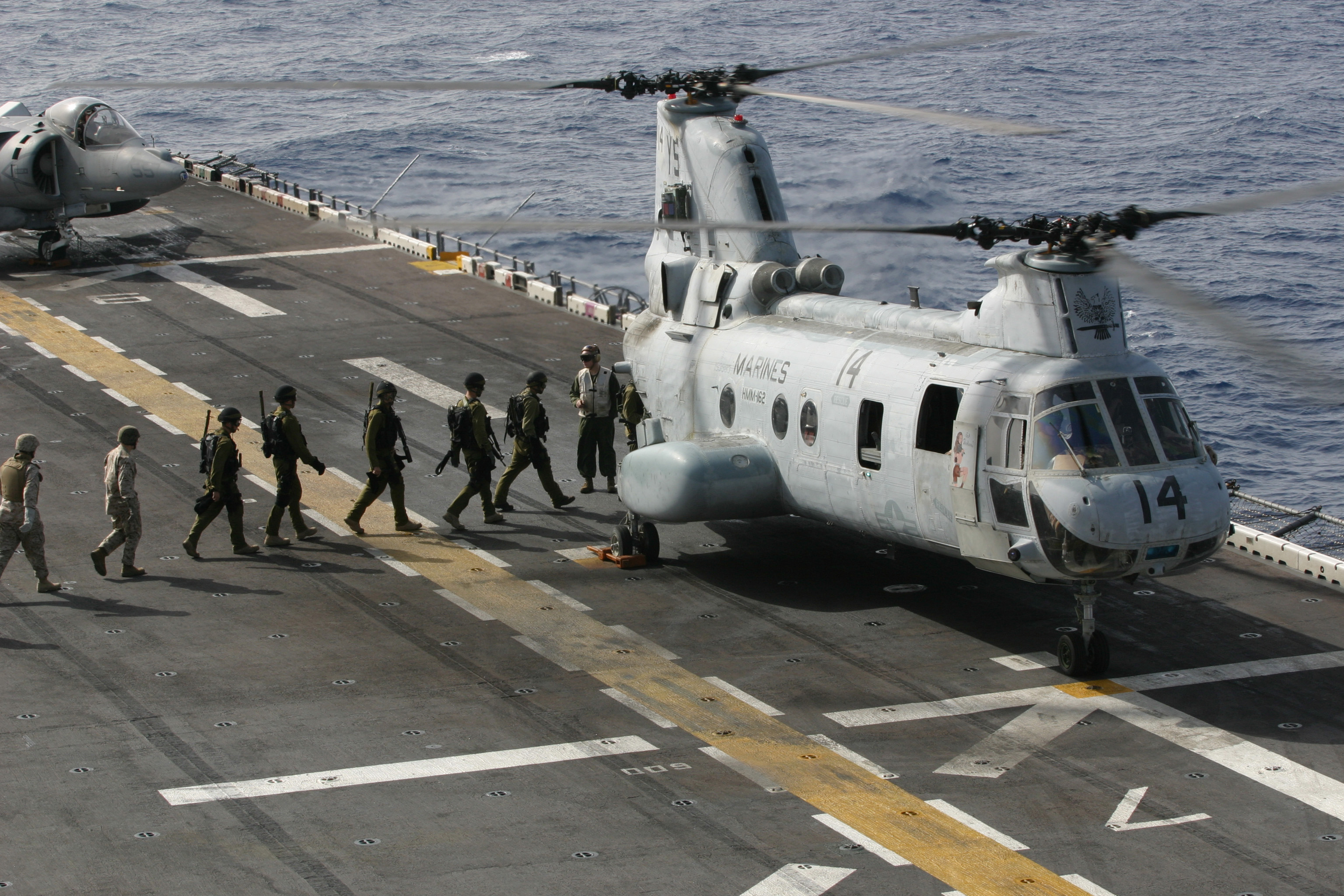
Israeli soldiers training alongside the 26th Marine Expeditionary Unit on the USS Kearsarge

- Institute for Economics and Peace Global Peace Index, 2017, ranked 144th out of 163
- Fund for Peace: Fragile States Index, 2017 (includes West Bank), 69th out of 178

== Politics ==
- Transparency International: 2016 Corruption Perceptions Index, ranked 28th out of 176 countries
- The Economist: Democracy Index 2020: ranked as a 'Flawed Democracy', 27th out of 167.
- Democracy Ranking 2016 (2014–15 data), ranked 26th out of 112

== Technology ==
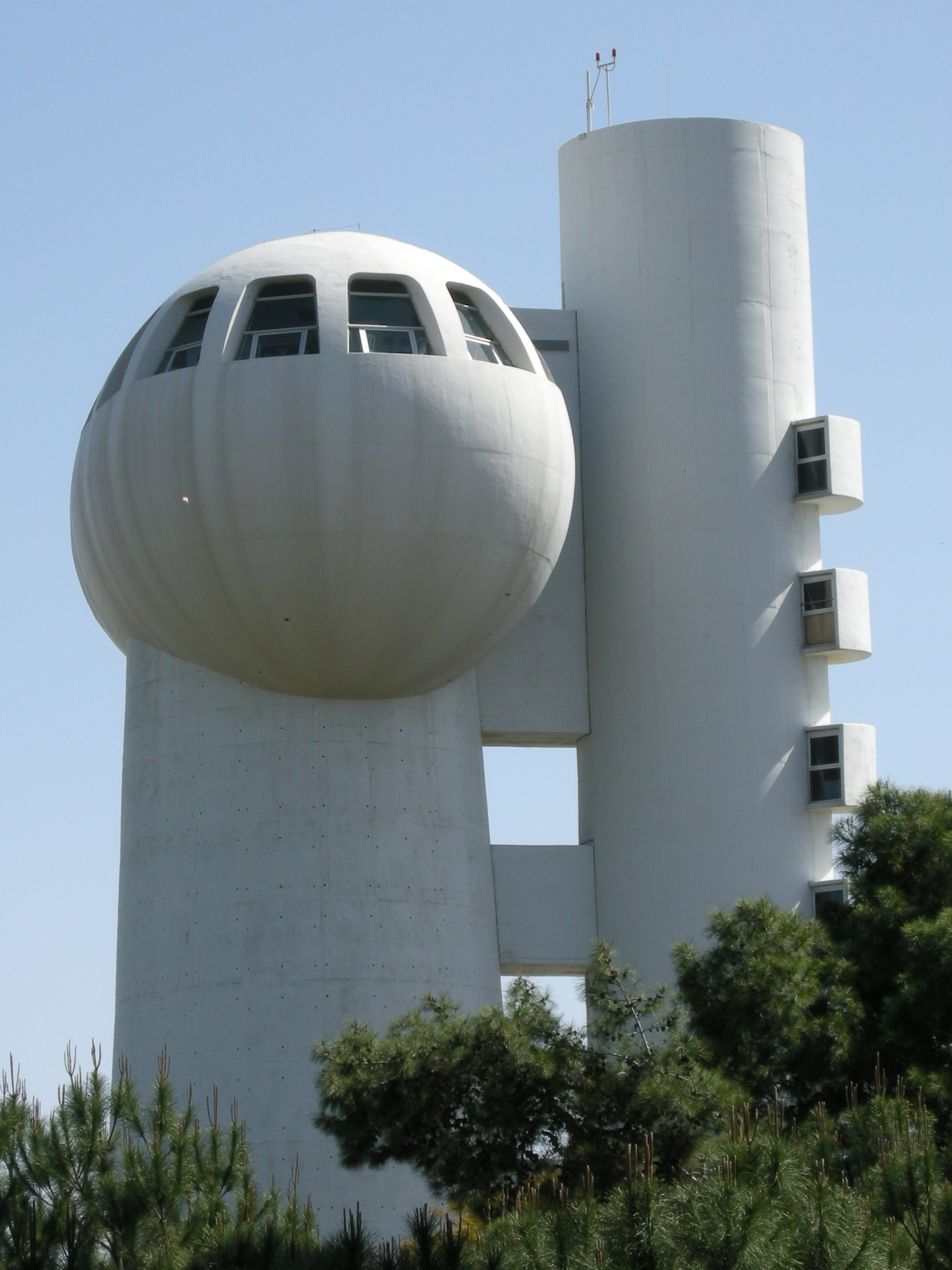
Weizmann Institute of Science

- Economist Intelligence Unit: E-readiness 2008, ranked 27th out of 70 countries
- United Nations: E-Government Survey 2016, ranked 20th out of 193
- WIPO: Global Innovation Index 2026, ranked 15th out of 139 countries

- Bloomberg Innovation Index 2015, ranked 5th out of 50
- Futron: Space Competitiveness Index 2012, ranked 9th in the world
- Akamai Technologies: State of the Internet Report, Q1 2017, ranked 28–30 out of 74 countries by average connection speed, 6 out of 74 by average peak speed

== Tourism ==
- World Economic Forum: Travel and Tourism Competitiveness Report 2017, ranked 61 out of 136
- UNWTO: World Tourism rankings 2015, ranked 53 out of 141
- InterNations Expat Insider Survey 2019, ranked 14 out of 64
