= Martin Burt =

Paraguayan social entrepreneur, author and politician (born 1957)

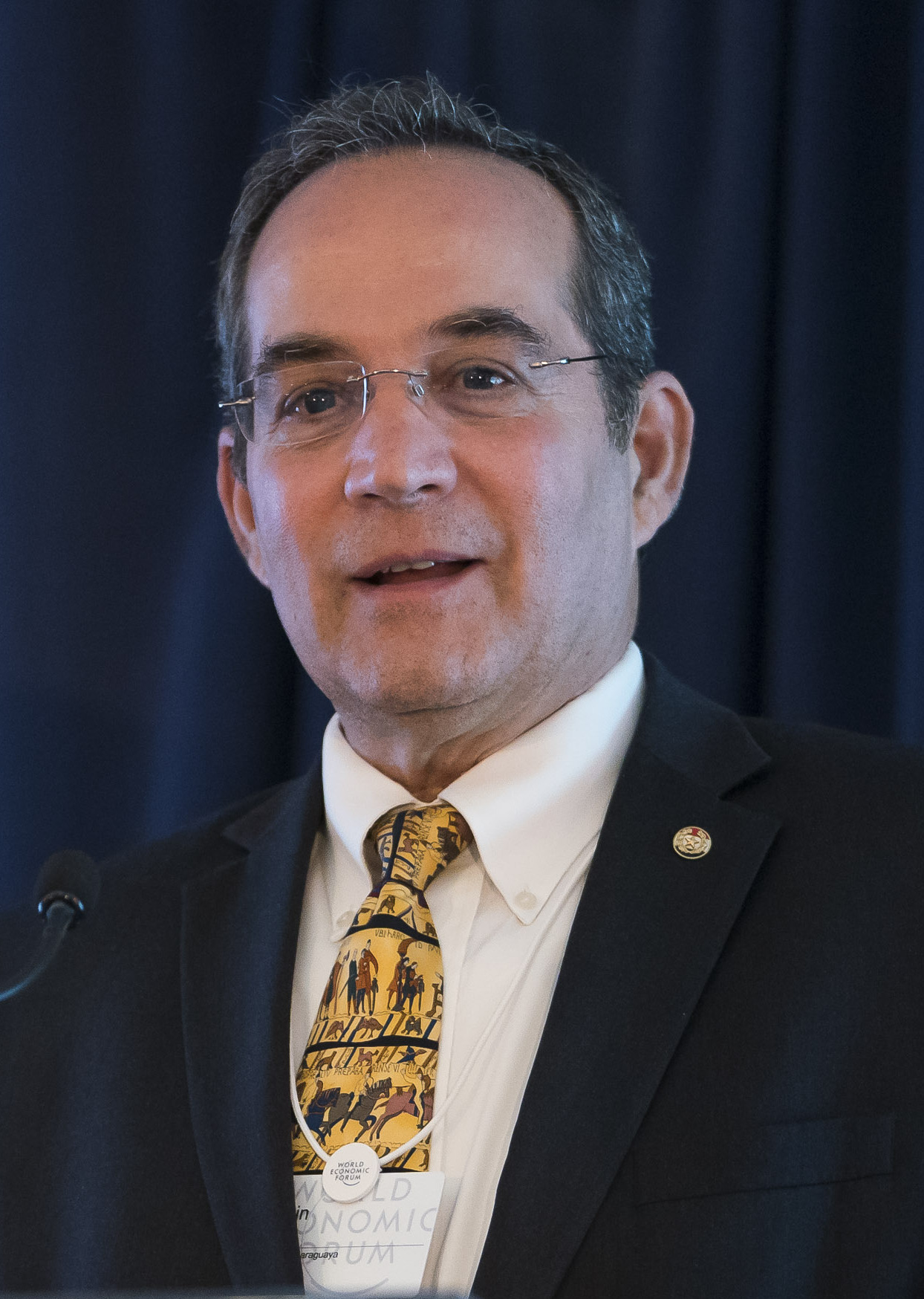
- Burt in 2018

Mayor of Asunción
- In office 17 December 1996 – 17 December 2001
- Preceded by: Carlos Filizzola
- Succeeded by: Enrique Riera

Personal details
- Born: Martín Luis Burt Artaza; 21 May 1957 (age 69) Asunción, Paraguay
- Party: Authentic Radical Liberal Party
- Spouse: Dorothy Wolf (m. 1982)
- Children: 4
- Education: University of the Pacific
- Occupation: CEO, Social Entrepreneur, Mayor
- Known for: Founder and CEO of Fundación Paraguaya, Mayor of Asunción

Martín Luis Burt Artaza (born 21 May 1957) is a Paraguayan social entrepreneur, author and politician. He was the former chief of staff to Paraguay's president, known for founding Fundación Paraguaya in 1985, a leading non-profit and micro-finance organization in Paraguay, and creator of the Poverty Stoplight, a poverty measurement tool and coaching methodology.

== Early life and education ==
Burt was born in Asunción, Paraguay, on 21 May 1957, to Daniel Gordon Burt and Deidamia Artaza. For his primary education, Burt attended the American School of Asunción and for his high school education attended Colegio Cristo Rey, before spending a year in compulsory military service as a corporal of the military police. Burt was determined to eliminate poverty in Paraguay from an early age, influenced by his father and grandmother who taught him that those more fortunate were morally obligated to give back to society by helping those less fortunate.

In 1980, Burt received his Bachelor of Arts degree in public administration and inter-American studies from the University of the Pacific in Stockton, California, where he served as student body president. He then attended George Washington University for a Master's Degree in Science, Technology and Public Policy. He later received a PhD in 2016 from Tulane University in Development Economics and International Development.

== Career ==
Burt has a long career in public service, non-profit work, and academia, including serving as Mayor of Asunción and founding Fundación Paraguaya.

=== Fundación Paraguaya ===
Burt founded Fundación Paraguaya in 1985, while Paraguay was still under the authoritarian rule of General Alfredo Stroessner. Fundación Paraguaya has developed several programs designed to solve poverty through entrepreneurship. They pioneered micro-finance in Paraguay, helping small businesses below the scope of traditional banks. In 1995, Fundación Paraguaya established their implementation of the Junior Achievement Program in Paraguay, which focuses on teaching concepts of entrepreneurship and financial literacy. The foundation was granted the San Francisco Agricultural School in Cerrito by De La Salle Brothers, a Roman Catholic congregation in 2003, turning it into a self-sustaining agricultural high school that serves rural poor youth. The foundation has since worked to replicate their model in 50 schools worldwide. In 2006, Burt co-founded Teach a Man to Fish, a UK charity based in London, England with Nik Kafka, a former intern with the foundation, in order to spread the student-led school business model. Fundación Paraguaya has been the recipient of several high-profile awards and acknowledgements, including awards from the Skoll Foundation, the Schwab Foundation for Social Entrepreneurship, and the Inter-American Development Bank.

==== Poverty Stoplight ====
Burt has built a platform based on his Poverty Stoplight model of the same name, produced as a project of Fundación Paraguaya. The platform has been adopted by the Paraguayan government and Burt is working with organizations in Mexico, Nigeria, Tanzania, and Uganda to bring the stoplight model to their local efforts. The Poverty Stoplight takes a multi-dimensional approach to poverty, allowing families to self-assess their situation through 50 different indicators on 6 different dimensions. These indicators, such as access to clean water or clothing, are rated at three levels, green, yellow, and red, allowing an easy to read scorecard to be developed. This helps both the family and supporting organizations to develop a plan to meet their needs and help them out of poverty, as well as giving organizations a map to assess programs and needs at a community level.

=== Public service ===
Burt served as chief of staff, Cabinet Secretary and close adviser to President Federico Franco from 2012 to 2013, where he helped lead the government's adoption of the Social Progress Index, an alternative economic indicator to the Gross Domestic Product. Burt was twice elected as the president of the Paraguayan-American Chamber of Commerce. He also served as Vice Secretary of Commerce from 1991 to 1993. He cofounded Pro-Paraguay, Paraguay's Export and Foreign Investment agency, in 1992.

==== Mayor of Asunción ====
On 17 December 1996, Burt began his five-year term as mayor of Asunción, Paraguay's capital and largest city. He came into office leading a political alliance of his party, the Authentic Radical Liberal Party, and the National Encounter Party. As mayor, Burt's new policies for the city, including the first deployment of municipal bonds, and securing loans from the World Bank and Inter-American Development Bank. He used these funds for a number of infrastructure projects, such as acquiring property for the city to build 80 public parks, developing pedestrian shelters, and recovering and developing a number of public spaces. In concert with the Salesian Works and Ministry of Social Action, he helped build collective housing for families displaced from the Chaco. His administration also restored and expanded a number of public arteries, constructed docks for public transport, renewed city automotive fleets, restored historical houses and sites, installed internet into classrooms in popular neighborhoods, and built urban walking trails, among other contributions to the public.

=== Academia ===
Burt is currently a distinguished visiting professor at the University of California, Irvine and a social entrepreneur in Residence at the Worcester Polytechnic Institute. He has also held a number of other academic positions, including adjunct professor at the Universidad Católica de Asunción from 1983 to 1984, visiting professor of social entrepreneurship at the University of the Pacific from 2006 to 2007, as well as professor of entrepreneurship and management at the American University of Nigeria from 2011 to 2017, and adjunct assistant professor at Tulane University.

=== Other nonprofit work ===
Burt was co-founder of two of Paraguay's leading environmental non-profits. In 1988, he co-founded the Moises Bertoni Foundation, an environmental NGO that focuses on preserving biodiversity and sustainable development. He also co-founded the Mbaracayú Biosphere Reserve Foundation, which established a permanently protected biosphere in the Mbaracayú subtropical rainforest located in the northeastern region of Paraguay near the Brazilian border. The Mbaracayú Reserve is managed by the Moises Bertoni Foundation. This area of 65,000 hectares is home to Paraguayan and Brazilian cattle ranchers and small holdings, two indigenous groups, and a wide variety of species and ecosystems.

Fundación Paraguaya and Fundación Moisés Bertoni collaborated to replicate the model of the San Francisco Agricultural School in the Mbaracayú Forest Reserve in the form of the all-girls Centro Educativo Mbaracayú school. The school was founded in 2009 with the aim of serving primarily the Ache and other native American communities in the area. The school was the focus of the 2016 documentary Daughters of the Forest by documentary filmmakers Samantha Grant and Carl Byker. Filmed over a course of five years, the film follows the lives of the school's first class through their matriculation. The film has been widely featured internationally since its release.

Burt also co-founded Lican Paraguay SA, a social enterprise that processes formerly contaminating animal blood from slaughterhouses and converts it into hemoglobin and plasma, profits going to save the Mbaracayú Forest Reserve.

Burt has been involved in a number of other organizations as a co-founder, such as the Asociación Paraguaya de la Calidad, Paraguay Educa, Club Universitario de Rugby de Asunción, and Sistema B Paraguay.

Martin serves on the board of directors of the Schwab Foundation for Social Entrepreneurship, and is also a member of the board of the Global Foodbanking Network. He has served as advisor to the WARC Group Sierra Leone since 2017.

== Personal life ==
During his time in Stockton, Burt met his future wife Dorothy Wolf, who he married in 1982. They have four children and live in Asunción, Paraguay. Burt is also the nephew of well-known Paraguayan artist Michael Burt.

== Honors, decorations, awards and distinctions ==
Burt has been widely recognized for his work as a social entrepreneur. In 2020, Burt was awarded the Wave Maker Award from HCL Technologies. He received a Skoll Award for Social Entrepreneurship in 2005, and won the 2004 Outstanding Social Entrepreneur Award from the Schwab Foundation for Social Entrepreneurship. He was awarded the Microfinance Award for Excellence in Social Responsibility from the Inter-American Development Bank, the Eisenhower Fellowship Award from the US and Taiwan, the UNESCO Orbis Guaraniticus Medal, and the Argentina National Academy of History Domingo Sarmiento Medal. He has also won awards from the Avina Foundation, Synergos, World Innovation Summit for Education, and Nestlé. He was awarded the Albert Bandura Influencer Award in 2014, the 2011 Opportunity Collaboration Achievement Award, the Social Innovator of the Year Award from the Ballard Center for Self-Reliance of Brigham Young University in 2007, the Distinguished Alumnus Award from the George Washington University in 2007, and the Distinguished Alumnus Award from the University of the Pacific in 2006.

== Publications, talks and interviews ==
In September 2019, Burt released his most recent book, Who Owns Poverty? In this book, he tells the story of his quest to understand poverty and how the Poverty Stoplight came to being.

In 2016, Burt co-wrote The Poverty Stoplight and its Psychological and Multidimensional Approach with Luis Fernando Sanabira, in Psychological Implications of Poverty (English version published in 2019). In 2013, he wrote a paper on the Poverty Stoplight, published by MIT Journals.

In 1984, Burt co-wrote Paraguay: Laws and Economy with Guillermo F. Peroni.

Burt regularly attends the Annual Meeting of the World Economic Forum in Davos, as well as the World Economic Meeting on Latin America and the Economic Forum Annual Meeting of the New Champions held in the People's Republic of China.

Martin has been a speaker at the Aspen Ideas Festival, King Fahd University of Petroleum and Minerals, UNIAPAC, CAF – Development Bank of Latin America and the Caribbean, World Islamic Economic Forum (WIEF), Synergos, Eisenhower Fellowships, ICERI 2014, and Development, as well as at TEDxPuraVida and TEDxBYU.

He was also invited as a speaker to a National Consultation on Building Cognitive Capital for Children organized jointly by UNICEF China and the Government of the People's Republic of China in 2017. He presented the Poverty Stoplight methodology at the 2017 Istanbul Innovation Days Conference organized by UNDP Turkey and Nesta. He made a presentation on Fundación Paraguaya's work on poverty elimination to the European Platform against Poverty and Social Exclusion in 2014.

At the end of 2019, Burt presented the Draft Bill Establishing Guidelines for Poverty Elimination in Paraguay, at a public hearing organized by the National Congress. The Draft Bill, based on the Poverty Stoplight methodology, is currently being studied by the Chamber of Senators.
