= Social Progress Imperative =

Nonprofit creating a social index

- Social Progress Imperative
- Website: www.socialprogress.org

The Social Progress Imperative is a US-based nonprofit created in 2012 best known for the Social Progress Index, a multi-indicator index that assesses the social and environmental performance of different countries. The Social Progress Index is an effort to complement the measure of national performance using traditional economic measures such as gross domestic product with data on social and environmental performance.

== History ==
In 2010, a group of scholars and business leaders sought to develop a better measure of a country's level of development and, by extension, better understand its development priorities. Under the technical guidance of Professors Michael Porter from Harvard Business School and Scott Stern from MIT, the group formed a US-based nonprofit called the Social Progress Imperative and launched a beta version of the Social Progress Index for 50 countries in 2013 to measure a comprehensive array of components of social and environmental performance and aggregate them into an overall framework.

This work was influenced by the contributions of Amartya Sen on social development, as well as by the recent call for action in the report "Mismeasuring Our Lives" by the Commission on the Measurement of Economic Performance and Social Progress. The Social Progress Index was released in 2014 for 133 countries with a second version in 2015.

On July 11, 2013, Social Progress Imperative's chairman and professor at Harvard Business School, Michael Porter, addressed the United Nations 6th Ministerial Forum for Development and discussed the Social Progress Index.

In addition to the global Social Progress Index, the methodology used to create it has been adapted to measure social and environmental performance in smaller areas, such as the Amazon region of Brazil. Other projects include a Social Progress Index for Guatemala City. Fundación Paraguaya has integrated elements of the Social Progress Index into its Poverty Stoplight tool. The national government of Paraguay is setting a target for Social Progress Index performance alongside GDP targets.

The Guardian reported that the European Commission had agreed to partner with Social Progress Imperative to create a Social Progress Index for the European Union. The EU Social Progress Index was published in October 2016.

A similar index, although with some differences compared to the nation list (and therefore not directly comparable), has been published for the individual U.S. states.

== Social Progress Index ==
The Social Progress Index examines social and environmental indicators that capture three distinct dimensions of social progress: Basic Human Needs, Foundations of Wellbeing, and Opportunity. The most recent version of the Social Progress Index is the 2021 Social Progress Index.

== Awards ==
Michael Green's TED Talk on The Social Progress Index was chosen as one of TED's favorite of 2014.

== Leadership ==
Michael E Porter of Harvard Business School is Chairman of the Advisory Board of the Social Progress Imperative. Other members of its board include Judith Roden of the Rockefeller Foundation and Matthew Bishop of The Economist magazine. Economist Michael Green is Executive Director of the Social Progress Imperative.

== See also ==
- Social Progress Index
