= International rankings of Poland =

These are the international rankings of Poland.

== International rankings ==
The following are links to international rankings of Poland.

Index	Rank	Countries reviewed
Human Development Index 2015	36	188
Index of Economic Freedom 2015	42	178
State of World Liberty Index 2015	35	180
Environmental Performance Index 2015	38	180
Environmental Vulnerability Index 2012	188	234
Education Index	34	181
Global Innovation Index, 2026	39	139
Global Peace Index 2015	22	163
Democracy Index 2015	48	167
World Bank Group Ease of Doing Business 2016	24	190
Privacy International Yearly Privacy ranking of countries, 2007	19	45
Reporters Without Borders Press Freedom Index 2015	47	180
Transparency International Corruption Perceptions Index 2015	30	168
Networked Readiness Index 2015	50	143
OECD Working time 2015	31	38
OICA Automobile Production 2015	21	39
World Bank Paying Taxes 2015	47	190
Suicide rate 2012	24	170
Total fertility rate 2015	198	210
PISA 2015 - Reading	13	72
PISA 2015 - Math	17	72
PISA 2015 - Science	22	72
EF English Proficiency Index 2016	10	72
Visa Restrictions Index 2016	36	199
