= EU Social Progress Index =

The European Union Regional Social Progress Index is a tool developed by the European Commission-Directorate General for Regional and Urban Policy in cooperation with the Social Progress Imperative and Orkestra Basque Institute of Competitiveness to measure the social progress in the 272 regions of the European Union. The European Union Regional Social Progress Index is based on the framework of the Global Social Progress Index, developed by the Social Progress Imperative (non-profit), but adapts both its methodology and indicators' set to the European Union context.

The definitive version was released in October 2016. A first draft was released in February 2016. As the main index, computed for more than 130 countries in the world, the EU Regional Social Progress Index (EU-SPI) is a tool to complement existing welfare indices (such as GDP per capita or HDI), evaluating how effectively the economic success of a country is transformed into social progress.

The EU-SPI unit of analysis are the 272 NUTS 2 Regions of the European Union. To do so, it uses 50 indicators (the main data sources are Eurostat and the EU-SILC). Those 50 indicators are divided in three main dimensions:

- Basic Human Needs
- Foundations of Wellbeing
- Opportunity

Each dimension is divided in four components, which at the time contain from three to seven indicators.

When the index was released, it showed a great contrast between how regions performed if we use the GDP per capita as a measure of well-being, and how they perform if we use the EU-SPI. Some regions, as the capital region of Belgium (Région de Bruxelles-Capitale), which has a large GDP per capita performed poorly in the EU-SPI (you can find other examples, mainly in capital regions and many regions in Italy and Spain)

The publication of the Index had a notable media impact, including articles in the BBC, The Huffington Post or El País
