= Outline of Australia =

Continent and country

Flag of Australia

Coat of arms of Australia

Location of Australia

The following outline is provided as an overview of and topical guide to Australia:

Australia, officially the Commonwealth of Australia, is a country comprising the mainland of the Australian continent, the island of Tasmania and numerous smaller islands. It has a total area of 7,688,287 km^{2} (2,968,464 sq mi), making it the sixth-largest country in the world and the largest in Oceania. Australia is the world's flattest and driest inhabited continent. It is a megadiverse country, and its size gives it a wide variety of landscapes and climates including deserts in the interior and tropical rainforests along the coast.

The ancestors of Aboriginal Australians began arriving from Southeast Asia 50,000 to 65,000 years ago, during the Last Glacial Period. By the time of British settlement, Aboriginal Australians spoke more than 250 distinct languages and had one of the oldest living cultures in the world. Australia's written history commenced with Dutch exploration of most of the coastline in the 17th century. British colonisation began in 1788 with the establishment of the penal colony of New South Wales. By the mid-19th century, most of the continent had been explored by European settlers and five additional self-governing British colonies were established, each gaining responsible government by 1890. The colonies federated in 1901, forming the Commonwealth of Australia. This continued a process of increasing autonomy from the United Kingdom, highlighted by the Statute of Westminster Adoption Act 1942, and culminating in the Australia Acts of 1986.

== General reference ==
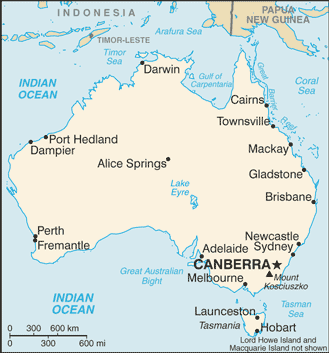
An enlargeable basic map of Australia

- Pronunciation: /əˈstreɪliə, ɒ-/
- Common English country name: Australia
- Official English country name: Commonwealth of Australia
- Common endonym(s): Australia
- Official endonym(s): Commonwealth of Australia
- Nicknames / colloquial names: Land Down Under, Oz
- Adjectival(s): Australian
- Demonym(s): Australian; Aussie (colloquial)
- Etymology: Name of Australia
- International rankings of Australia
- ISO country codes: AU, AUS, 036
- ISO region codes: See ISO 3166-2:AU
- Internet country code top-level domain: .au

== Geography ==
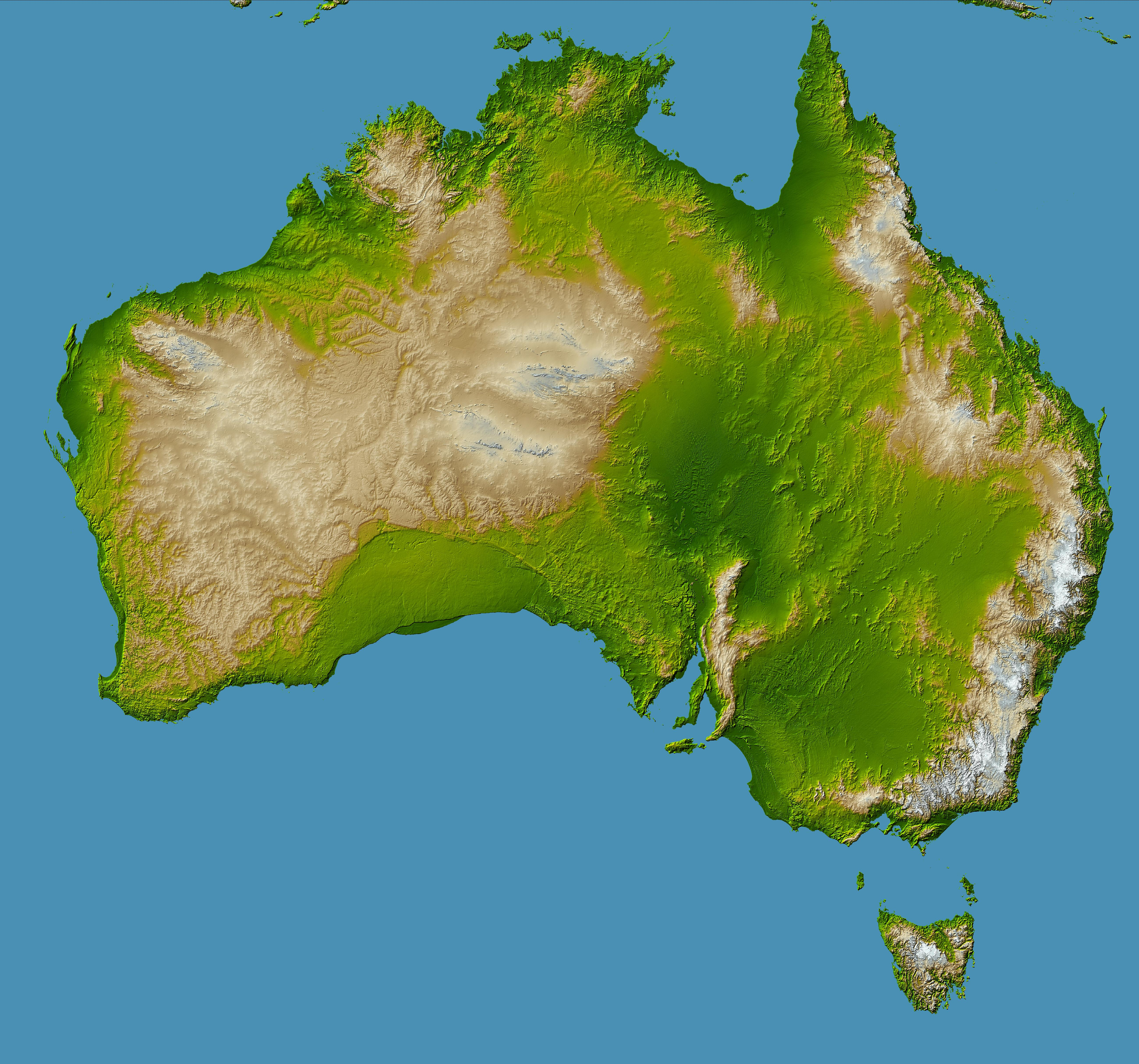
An enlargeable topographic map of Australia

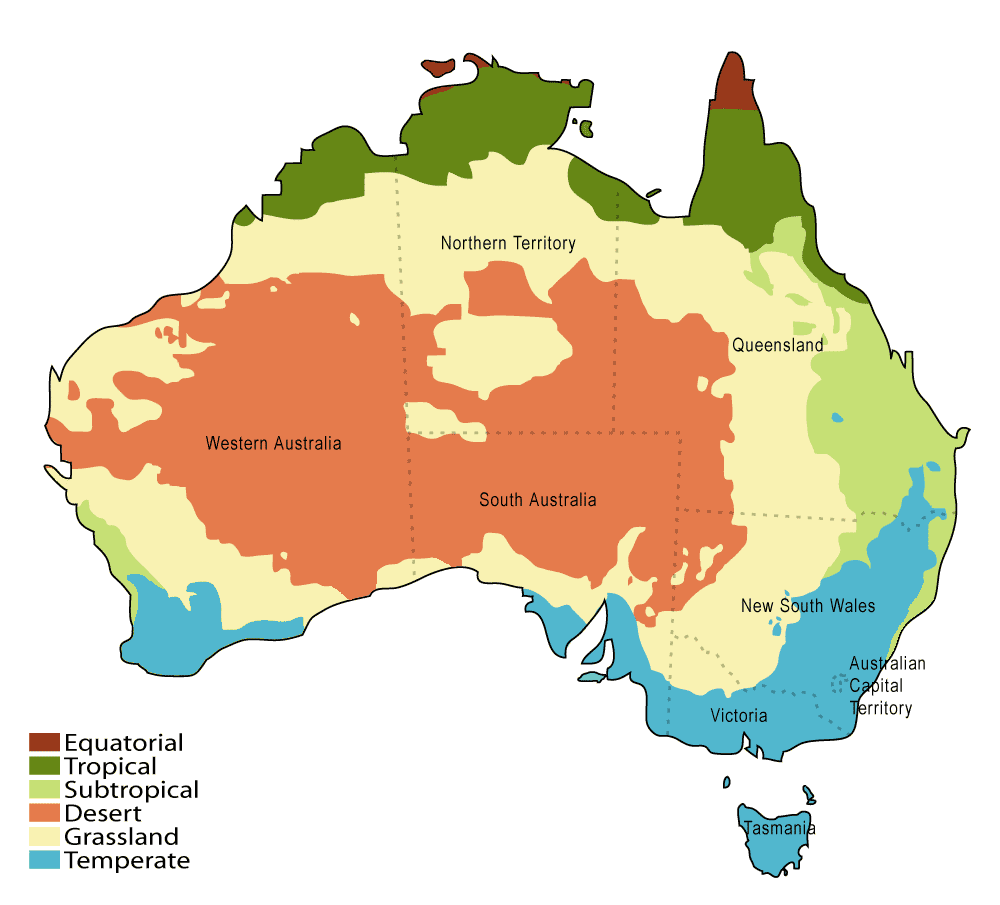
Climatic zones in Australia based on Köppen classification

Extreme points of mainland Australia

Geography of Australia

- Australia is:
  - a continent
  - a country
    - a sovereign state
    - a nation state
    - a Commonwealth realm
    - a federation
    - a megadiverse country
- Location:
  - Earth
    - Southern Hemisphere
    - Eastern Hemisphere
    - Oceania
      - Australasia
  - Australia lies between:
    - Indian Ocean
    - Pacific Ocean
    - Southern Ocean
  - Time zones:
    - Australian Western Standard Time (AWST) – UTC+08
    - Australian Central Standard Time (ACST) – UTC+09:30
    - Australian Eastern Standard Time (AEST) – UTC+10
    - Daylight saving time
      - Australian Central Daylight Time (ACDT) – UTC+10:30
      - Australian Eastern Daylight Time (AEDT) – UTC+11
    - Unofficial time zones
      - Central Western Standard Time (CWST) – UTC+08:45
  - Extreme points of Australia (mainland)
    - Northernmost Point – Cape York, Queensland (10°41' S)
    - Southernmost Point – South Point, Wilsons Promontory, Victoria (39°08' S)
    - Westernmost Point – Steep Point, Western Australia (113°09' E)
    - Easternmost Point – Cape Byron, New South Wales (153°38' E)
    - Highest Point – Mount Kosciuszko 2,228 m (7,310 ft)
    - Lowest Point – Lake Eyre −15 m (−49 ft)
  - Land boundaries: none
  - Coastline: 25,760 km
- Population of Australia: 27,915,880 people (March 2026) – 54th most populous country
- Area of Australia: 7,688,287 km^{2} (2,968,464 sq mi) – 6th largest country
- Capital of Australia: Canberra
- Atlas of Australia
- Surveying in Australia

=== Environment ===
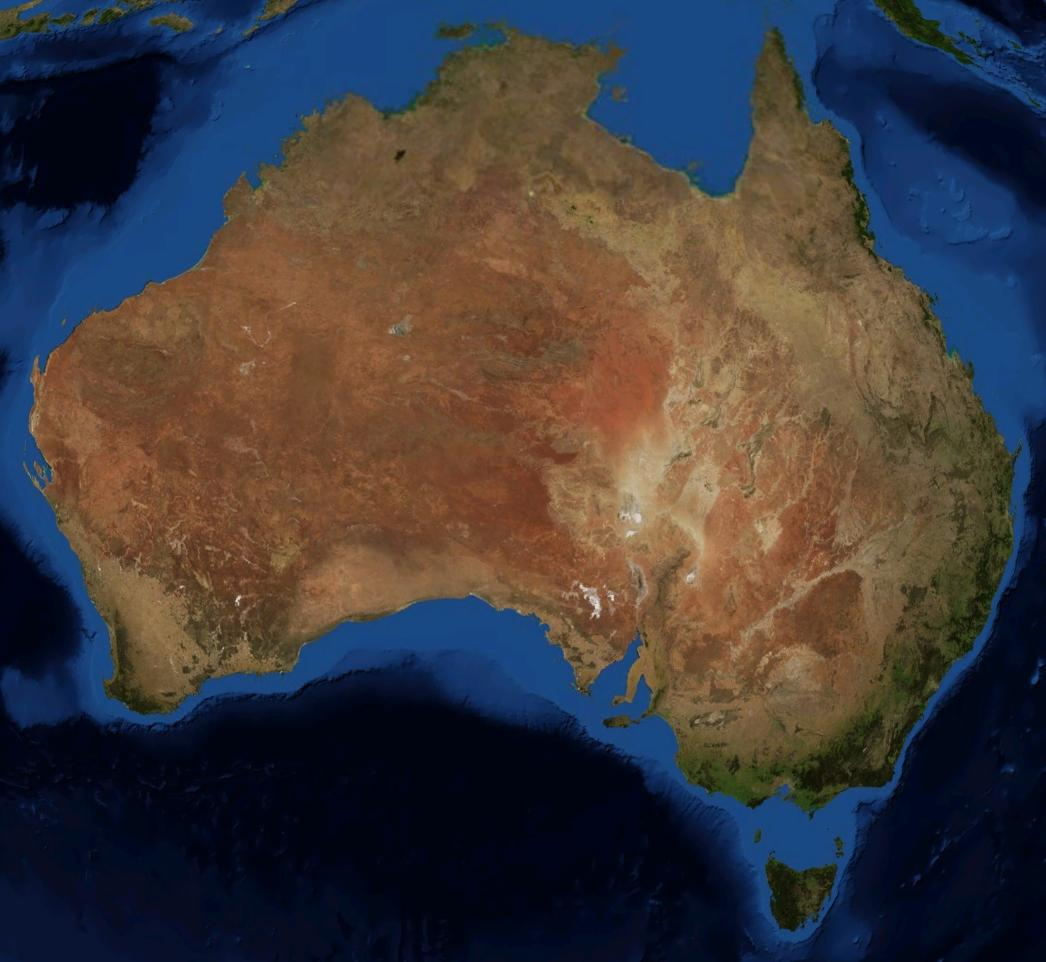
An enlargeable satellite image of Australia

Environment of Australia

- Climate of Australia
  - Bushfires in Australia
  - Climate change in Australia
  - Effects of global warming on Australia
- Ecoregions of Australia
- Environmental issues in Australia
- Renewable energy in Australia
  - Geothermal power in Australia
  - Solar power in Australia
  - Wind power in Australia
- Geology of Australia
- National parks of Australia
- Protected areas of Australia
- Wildlife of Australia
  - Flora of Australia
  - Fauna of Australia
    - Birds of Australia
    - Mammals of Australia
Iconic wildlife of Australia

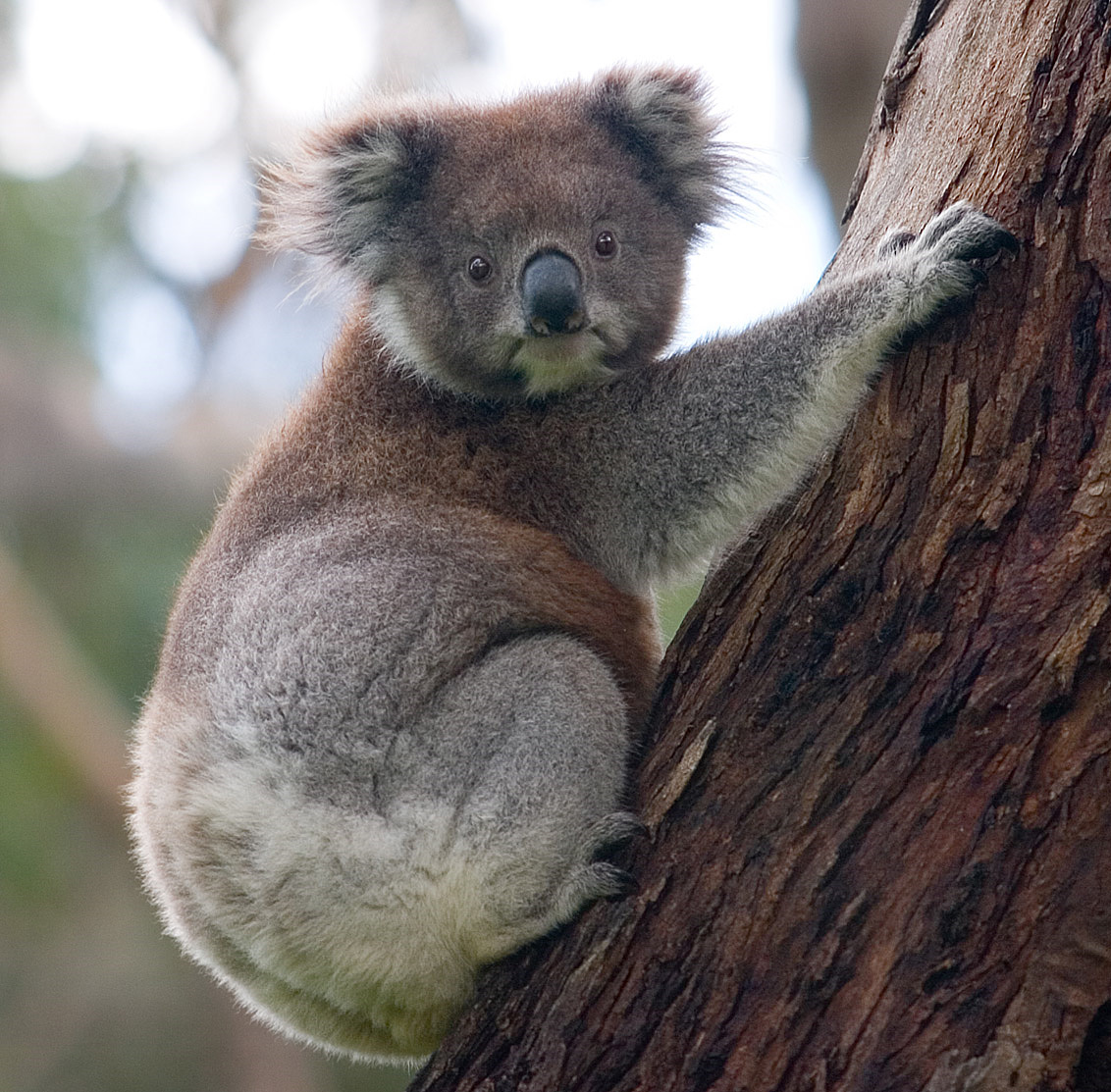
A koala.

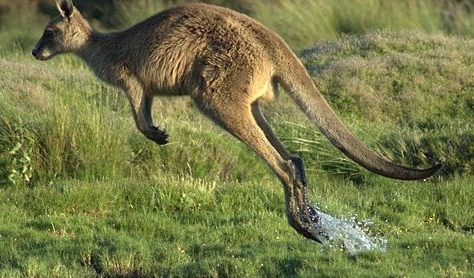
A kangaroo.

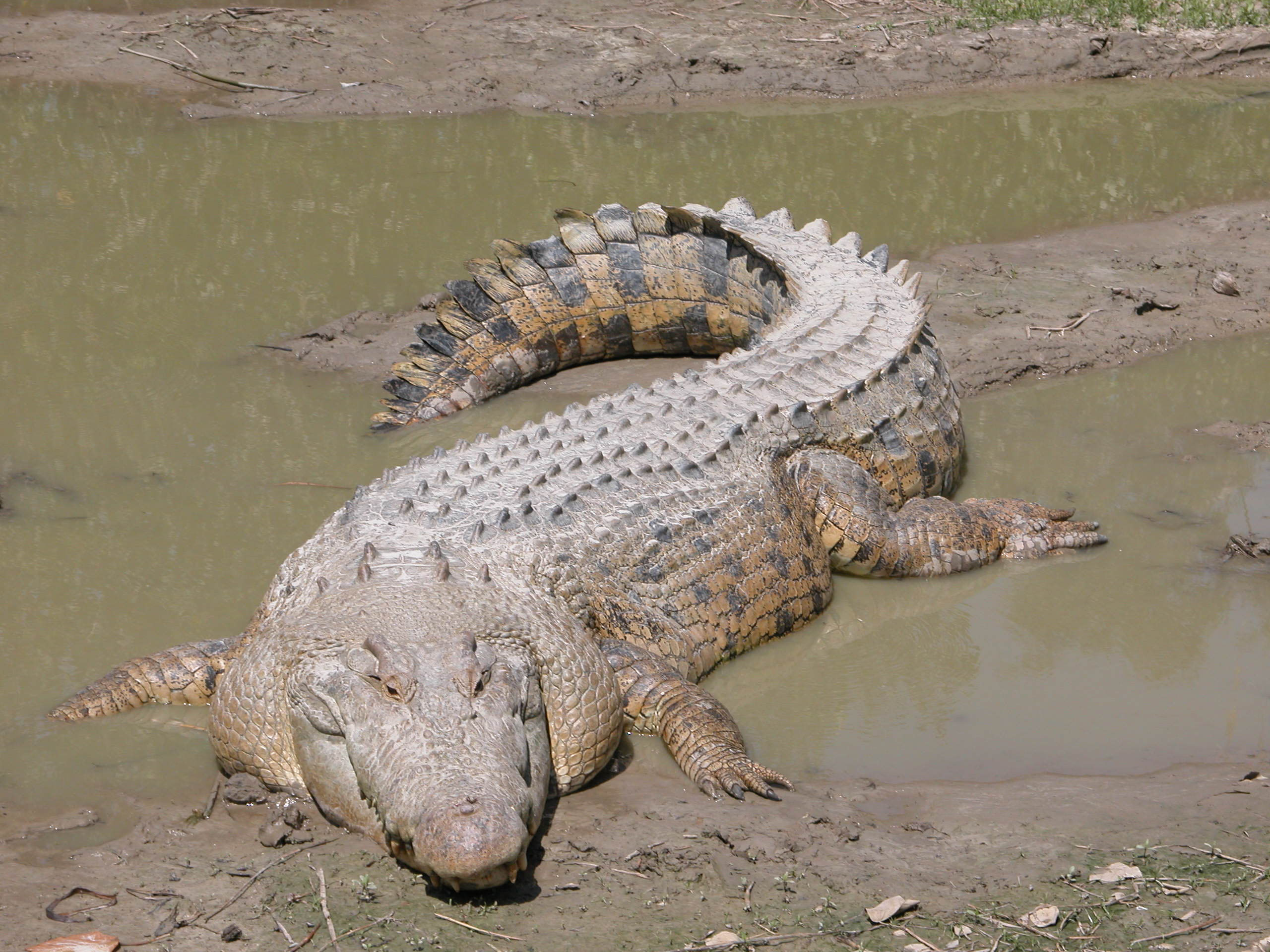
The Saltwater crocodile is the largest species of crocodile in the world.

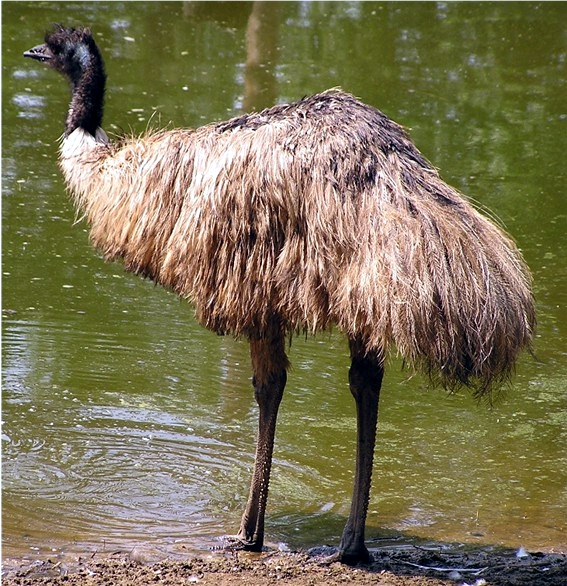
An emu.

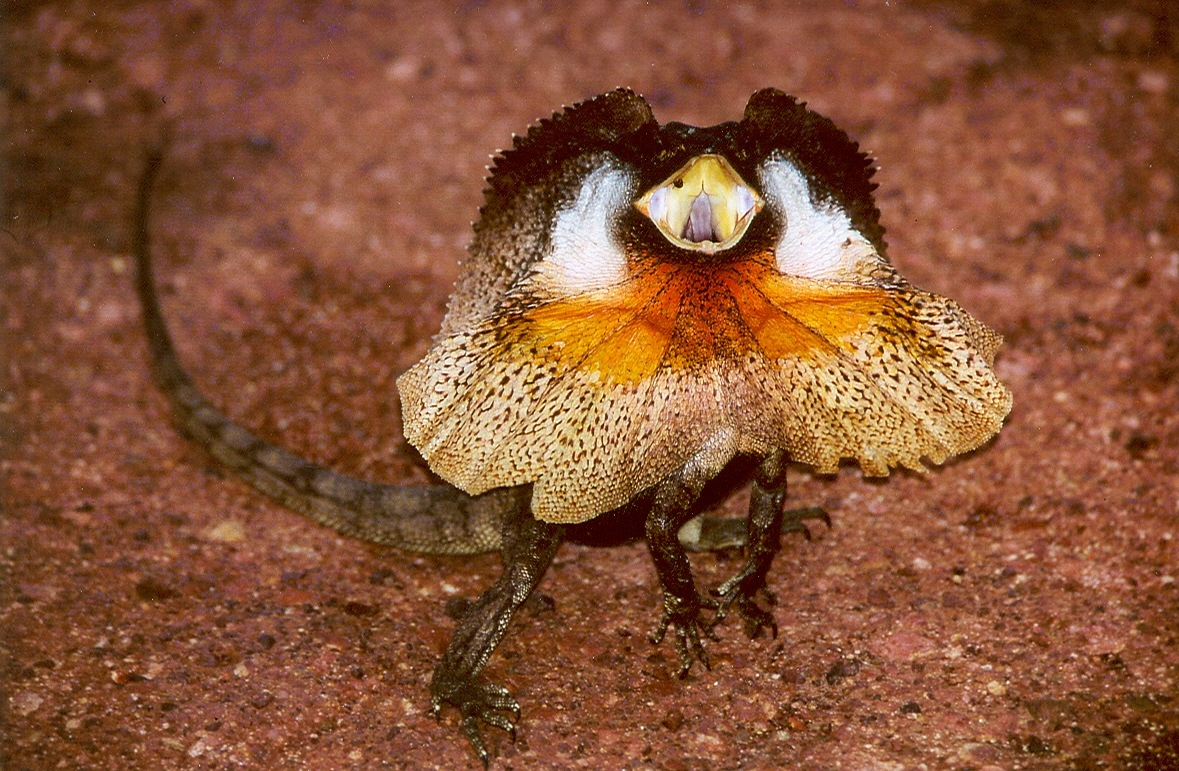
Frill-necked lizard.

==== Geographic features ====
- Islands of Australia
- Lakes of Australia
- Mountains of Australia
  - Volcanoes in Australia
- Rivers of Australia
- Valleys of Australia
- Waterfalls of Australia
- World Heritage Sites in Australia

=== Regions ===
- Ecoregions in Australia

==== Multi-state regions ====
- Barkly Tableland
- Capital Country
- Eastern states of Australia
- East Coast of Australia
- Lake Eyre basin
- Murray–Darling basin
- Northern Australia
- The Nullarbor
- Outback
- Southern Australia

==== Administrative divisions ====
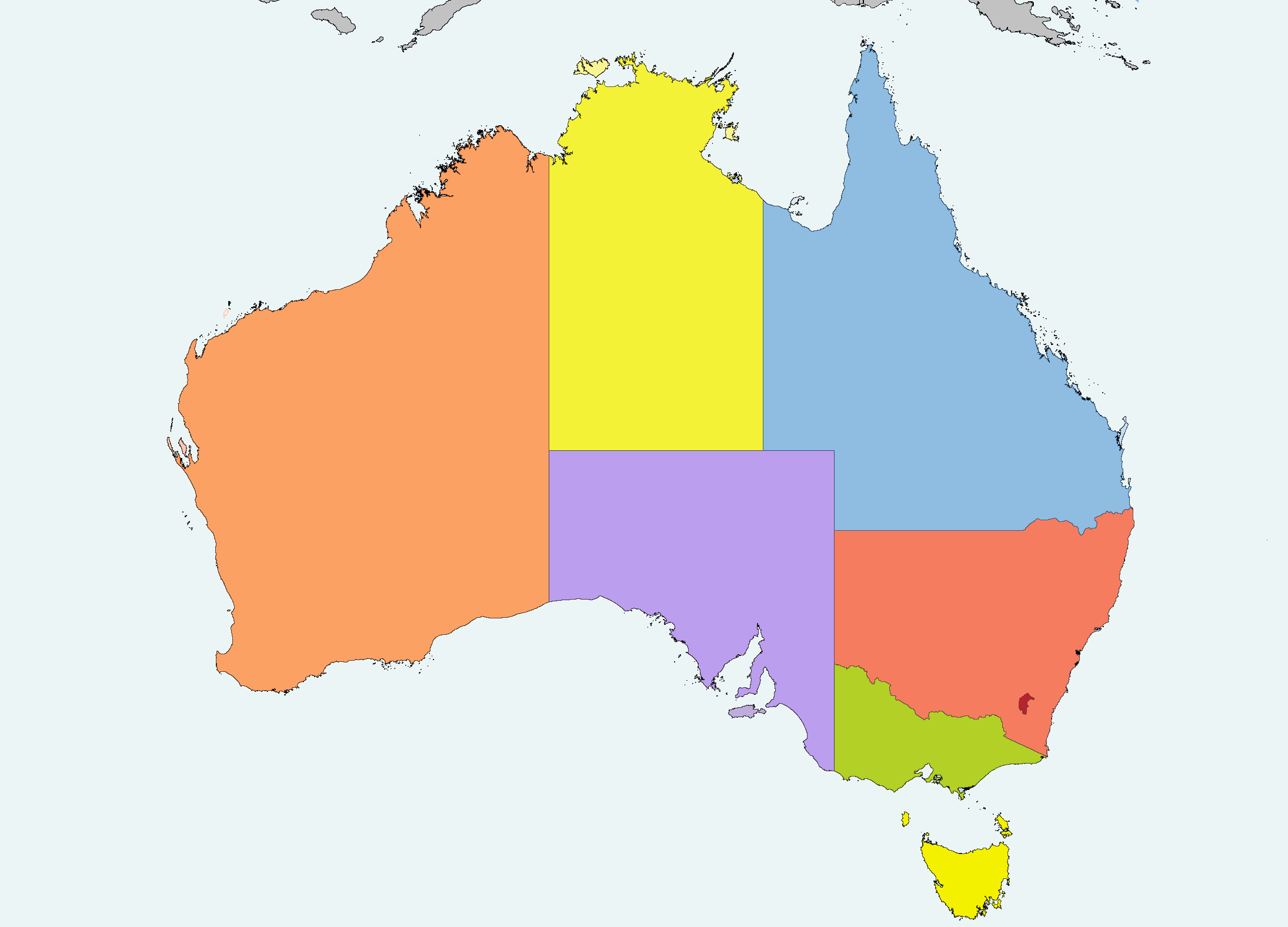

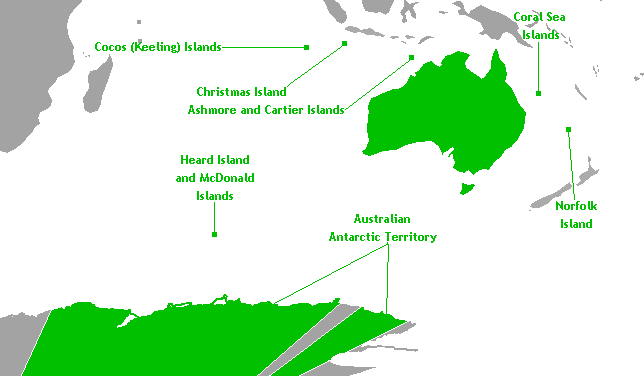
Australian external territories

States and territories of Australia

===== States =====
- New South Wales
- Victoria
- Queensland
- Western Australia
- South Australia
- Tasmania

===== Territories =====
====== Mainland territories ======
- Australian Capital Territory
- Northern Territory
- Jervis Bay Territory

====== External territories ======
- Ashmore and Cartier Islands
- Australian Antarctic Territory
- Norfolk Island
- Christmas Island
- Cocos (Keeling) Islands
- Coral Sea Islands Territory
- Heard and McDonald Islands

===== Municipalities =====
Local government in Australia

- Cities of Australia

=== Demography ===
State/territory	Land area (km^{2})	Rank	Population (2025)	Rank	Population density (/km^{2})	Rank	% of population in capital	Rank
New South Wales	801,150	5th	8,593,871	1st	10.49	3rd	64.7%	5th
Victoria	227,444	6th	7,074,468	2nd	30.18	2nd	75.6%	4th
Queensland	1,723,030	2nd	5,674,834	3rd	3.18	5th	49.0%	7th
Western Australia	2,527,013	1st	3,043,731	4th	1.15	7th	78.3%	2nd
South Australia	984,321	4th	1,902,331	5th	1.89	6th	77.2%	3rd
Tasmania	68,402	7th	575,960	6th	8.89	4th	44.3%	8th
Australian Capital Territory	2,358	8th	484,792	7th	198.97	1st	97.7%	1st
Northern Territory	1,347,791	3rd	264,411	8th	0.19	8th	57.7%	6th

- List of Adelaide suburbs
- List of Adelaide obsolete suburb names
- List of Albany suburbs
- List of Brisbane suburbs
- List of Bunbury suburbs
- List of Canberra suburbs
- List of Central Coast, New South Wales suburbs
- List of Darwin suburbs
- List of Gold Coast suburbs
- List of Hobart suburbs
- List of Karratha suburbs
- List of Mackay suburbs
- List of Mandurah suburbs
- List of Melbourne suburbs
- List of suburbs in Greater Newcastle, New South Wales
- List of Perth suburbs
- List of Rockhampton suburbs
- List of Sunshine Coast Region suburbs
- List of Sydney suburbs
- Suburbs of Thuringowa City
- List of Townsville suburbs
- List of Wagga Wagga suburbs and localities
- Western suburbs (Melbourne)
- List of Wollongong suburbs

== Government and politics ==
Political parties in government in 1945. Labor Liberal National/Country Other Coalition Other No government

- Form of government: Federal parliamentary constitutional monarchy
- Capital of Australia: Canberra
- Far-right politics in Australia
- Political scandals of Australia
- Socialism in Australia
- Republicanism in Australia
- Taxation in Australia

=== Elections in Australia ===
Elections in Australia

- Section 44 of the Constitution of Australia
- 1901 – 1972 – 1974 – 1975 – 1977 – 1980 – 1983 – 1984 – 1987 – 1990 – 1993 – 1996 – 1998 – 2001 – 2004 – 2007 – 2010 – 2013 – 2016 – 2019 – 2022 – 2025
- Australian electoral system
  - Commonwealth Electoral Act 1918
  - Australian Electoral Commission
  - Compulsory voting
  - Preferential voting
  - Electorates of the Australian House of Representatives
- Divisions of the Australian House of Representatives

=== Political parties in Australia ===
List of political parties in Australia

- List of historical political parties in Australia

==== Federal parties ====
===== Current major parties/groupings (May 2025) =====
- Australian Labor Party
- Liberal Party of Australia
- National Party of Australia
- Coalition (Australia)

===== Minor parties/groupings =====
- Australian Greens
- Centre Alliance
- Australia's Voice
- Katter's Australian Party
- Teal independents
- Independent politicians in Australia

==== State/territory parties ====
===== Queensland =====
- Liberal National Party of Queensland
- Queensland Labor Party

===== Northern Territory =====
- Country Liberal Party

=== Federal government of Australia ===
Government of Australia

- Separation of powers in Australia

==== Executive branch ====
- Head of state: King of Australia (King Charles III)
  - Head of state's representative: Governor-General (Sam Mostyn)
- Head of government: Prime Minister of Australia (Anthony Albanese)
- Cabinet of Australia
  - Second Albanese ministry (Current ministry as of May 2025)
  - List of Australian ministries
- Federal Executive Council

==== Legislative branch ====
- Parliament of Australia
  - Australian monarch
  - Australian Senate
    - President of the Australian Senate
  - Australian House of Representatives
    - Speaker of the House of Representatives
    - Opposition Leader (at last election: Peter Dutton)
  - Leader of the Opposition
    - Angus Taylor (As of February 2026)

==== Judicial branch ====
Judiciary of Australia

- High Court of Australia
- Australian court hierarchy
- Constitution of Australia

=== Military ===
Australian Defence Force (ADF)

- Command
  - Commander-in-chief: Governor-General as the King's representative.
    - Minister for Defence of Australia (Richard Marles)
- Forces
  - Army of Australia: Australian Army
  - Navy of Australia: Royal Australian Navy
  - Air force of Australia: Royal Australian Air Force
  - Special forces of Australia
- Military history of Australia
- Australian Defence Force ranks

=== Foreign relations ===
- ANZUS
- Australia–United States relations
- Australia–New Zealand relations
- Australia–Indonesia relations
- Australia–China relations
- Australia–Japan relations
- Anglo-Australian relations
- Australia and the United Nations

=== International organisation membership ===
The Commonwealth of Australia is a member of:

- Asian Development Bank (ADB)
- Asia-Pacific Economic Cooperation (APEC)
- Association of Southeast Asian Nations (ASEAN) (dialogue partner)
- Association of Southeast Asian Nations Regional Forum (ARF)
- Australia Group
- Australia-New Zealand-United States Security Treaty (ANZUS)
- Bank for International Settlements (BIS)
- Colombo Plan (CP)
- Commonwealth of Nations
- East Asia Summit (EAS)
- European Bank for Reconstruction and Development (EBRD)
- Food and Agriculture Organization (FAO)
- Group of Twenty Finance Ministers and Central Bank Governors (G20)
- Informal social partnership (MIKTA)
- International Atomic Energy Agency (IAEA)
- International Bank for Reconstruction and Development (IBRD)
- International Chamber of Commerce (ICC)
- International Civil Aviation Organization (ICAO)
- International Criminal Court (ICCt)
- International Criminal Police Organization (Interpol)
- International Development Association (IDA)
- International Energy Agency (IEA)
- International Federation of Red Cross and Red Crescent Societies (IFRCS)
- International Finance Corporation (IFC)
- International Hydrographic Organization (IHO)
- International Labour Organization (ILO)
- International Maritime Organization (IMO)
- International Mobile Satellite Organization (IMSO)
- International Monetary Fund (IMF)
- International Olympic Committee (IOC)
- International Organization for Migration (IOM)
- International Organization for Standardization (ISO)
- International Red Cross and Red Crescent Movement (ICRM)
- International Telecommunication Union (ITU)
- International Telecommunications Satellite Organization (ITSO)
- International Trade Union Confederation (ITUC)
- Inter-Parliamentary Union (IPU)
- Multilateral Investment Guarantee Agency (MIGA)
- Non-Aligned Movement (NAM) (guest)
- Nuclear Energy Agency (NEA)
- Nuclear Suppliers Group (NSG)
- Organisation for Economic Co-operation and Development (OECD)
- Organisation for the Prohibition of Chemical Weapons (OPCW)
- The Pacific Community (SPC)
- Pacific Islands Forum (PIF)
- Paris Club
- Permanent Court of Arbitration (PCA)
- South Asian Association for Regional Cooperation (SAARC) (observer)
- South Pacific Regional Trade and Economic Co-operation Agreement (Sparteca)
- United Nations (UN)
- United Nations Conference on Trade and Development (UNCTAD)
- United Nations Educational, Scientific, and Cultural Organization (UNESCO)
- United Nations High Commissioner for Refugees (UNHCR)
- United Nations Integrated Mission in Timor-Leste (UNMIT)
- United Nations Mission in the Sudan (UNMIS)
- United Nations Relief and Works Agency for Palestine Refugees in the Near East (UNRWA)
- United Nations Truce Supervision Organization (UNTSO)
- Universal Postal Union (UPU)
- World Customs Organization (WCO)
- World Federation of Trade Unions (WFTU)
- World Health Organization (WHO)
- World Intellectual Property Organization (WIPO)
- World Meteorological Organization (WMO)
- World Tourism Organization (UNWTO)
- World Trade Organization (WTO)
- World Veterans Federation
- Zangger Committee (ZC)

=== Law and order ===
Law of Australia

- Citizenship
- Cannabis in Australia
- Constitution of Australia
- Crime in Australia
- Human rights in Australia
- LGBTQ rights in Australia
- Referendums in Australia
  - 2023 Australian Indigenous Voice referendum

==== Law enforcement in Australia ====
Law enforcement in Australia

- National law enforcement agencies
  - Australian Border Force (ABF)
  - Australian Federal Police (AFP)
  - Australian Competition & Consumer Commission (ACCC)
  - Australian Crime Commission (ACC)
  - Australian Securities & Investments Commission (ASIC)
  - Australian Taxation Office (ATO)
- Regional law enforcement agencies – the following policing agencies are regulated by their respective State or Territory Government and are highly visible:
  - Australian Capital Territory Police
  - New South Wales Police Force
  - Northern Territory Police
  - Queensland Police Service
  - South Australia Police
  - Tasmania Police
  - Victoria Police
  - Western Australia Police

=== State and territory governments ===
The states of Australia are governed by Premiers, and the territories are governed by Chief Ministers.

- Governors of the Australian states
- Parliaments of the Australian states and territories
- Premiers of the Australian states
- Government of New South Wales
- Government of Queensland
- Government of South Australia
- Government of Tasmania
- Government of Victoria
- Government of Western Australia
- Government of the Australian Capital Territory
- Government of the Northern Territory

=== Local government ===
- Local government in Australia

== History ==
Map showing the creation of the colonies/states and mainland territories.

- Prehistory of Australia
- Australian archaeology
- European exploration of Australia
- History of Australia (1788–1850)
- History of Australia (1851–1900)
- History of Australia (1901–1945)
  - Federation of Australia
  - Australia in World War I
  - Australia in World War II
  - Stolen Generations
- History of Australia since 1945
- Constitutional history of Australia
- Immigration history of Australia
- Postage stamps and postal history of Australia

=== History of states ===
- History of New South Wales
- History of the Northern Territory
- History of Queensland
- History of South Australia
- History of Tasmania
- History of Victoria
- History of Western Australia

== Indigenous Australia ==
- Aboriginal Australians
- Torres Strait Islanders
- Indigenous Australian cultures
- Indigenous Australian languages
- Native title in Australia
- Uluru Statement from the Heart

== Culture ==
- Architecture of Australia
  - Architecture of Western Australia
  - Australian architectural styles
- Australian art
  - Indigenous Australian art
- Cinema of Australia
- Australian cuisine
- Dance in Australia
- Festivals in Australia
- Australian folklore
- Humour in Australia
- Languages of Australia
  - Australian Aboriginal languages
  - Australian Aboriginal English
  - Australian English
- Australian literature
- Media of Australia
  - Television in Australia
  - Cinema of Australia
- Music of Australia
  - Australian music charts
  - Australian country music
  - Australian hip hop
  - Australian jazz
  - Australian rock
  - Indigenous Australian music
  - Music of immigrant communities in Australia
- National symbols of Australia
  - Coat of arms of Australia
  - Flag of Australia
  - National anthems:
    - Official national anthem: Advance Australia Fair
    - Royal anthem: God Save the King
- People of Australia
  - Australian diaspora
  - Australian of the Year
- Prostitution in Australia
- Public holidays in Australia
- World Heritage Sites in Australia
- Theatre of Australia

== Economy and infrastructure ==
- Economic rank, by nominal GDP (2025): 14th (fourteenth)
- Agriculture in Australia
- Telecommunications in Australia
  - Internet in Australia
- Reserve Bank of Australia
  - List of pizzerias in Australia
  - List of restaurant chains in Australia
- Currency of Australia: Dollar
  - ISO 4217: AUD
- Economic history of Australia
- Energy in Australia
  - Energy policy of Australia
    - Effects of global warming on Australia
    - Garnaut Climate Change Review
  - Coal in Australia
  - Carbon capture and storage in Australia
  - Geothermal power in Australia
  - Solar power in Australia
  - Wind power in Australia
- Health care in Australia
- Median household income in Australia and New Zealand
- Mining in Australia
  - Coal mining in Australia
- Australian Securities Exchange
- Tourism in Australia
  - Visa policy of Australia
- Transport in Australia
  - Airports in Australia
  - Rail transport in Australia
  - Road transport in Australia
  - Tunnels in Australia
- Water supply and sanitation in Australia

=== State economies ===
- Economy of New South Wales
- Economy of Queensland
- Economy of South Australia
- Economy of Tasmania
- Economy of Victoria
- Economy of Western Australia

== Education ==
- Homeschooling and distance education in Australia
- Public and private education in Australia
- Universities in Australia
  - Group of Eight

=== States education ===
- Education in New South Wales
- Education in Queensland
- Education in South Australia
- Education in Tasmania
- Education in Victoria
- Education in Western Australia
- Education in the Australian Capital Territory

== Religion and belief systems in Australia ==
- Australian Aboriginal religion and mythology
- Irreligion in Australia
- Religion in Australia
  - Buddhism in Australia
  - Christianity in Australia
    - Catholicism in Australia
    - Protestantism in Australia
  - Hinduism in Australia
  - Islam in Australia
  - Judaism in Australia
    - History of the Jews in Australia
  - Sikhism in Australia

== Sport ==
Sport in Australia

- Australia at the Olympics
- Australia at the Commonwealth Games
- Football in Australia
  - Soccer in Australia
  - Australian rules football in Australia
  - Rugby union in Australia
  - Rugby league in Australia
- Basketball in Australia
- Cricket in Australia
- Field hockey in Australia
- Golf in Australia
- Motorsport in Australia
- Netball in Australia
- Pickleball in Australia
- Skiing in Australia
- Swimming in Australia
  - Swimming Australia
  - List of Australian records in swimming
  - Women's swimming in Australia
- Tennis in Australia
- Australian horse racing
- Winter sport in Australia

== See also ==
- List of Australia-related topics
- List of articles about Australia and New Zealand jointly
- Member states of the Commonwealth of Nations
- Members states of the Group of Twenty
- Member states of the United Nations
- Outline of geography
- Outline of Oceania
- List of place names of Dutch origin
