= Eisenhower Fellowships =

Private, non-profit organization

- Founded: October 13, 1953
- Type: 501(c)(3)
- Location: Philadelphia, Pennsylvania, U.S.
- Website: efworld.org

Eisenhower Fellowships (EF) is a private, non-profit organization created in 1953 by a group of American citizens to honor President Dwight D. Eisenhower for his contribution to humanity as a soldier, statesman, and world leader. The organization describes itself as an "independent, nonpartisan international leadership organization".

== History ==
In 1953, Thomas Bayard McCabe led a group of Pennsylvania businessmen in the establishment of Eisenhower Exchange Fellowships (EEF) to commemorate President Dwight D. Eisenhower's first birthday in the White House. The program was initiated with donations totaling $125,000, which were reported as having been "pledged by 50 American industrialists".

== Format ==
EF annually hosts two international fellowship programs of 20–25 Fellows each. The first is the Global Program of Fellows from around the world, followed by a fall program targeted to a specific country, region or sector.

Through its USA Program, EF also sends a smaller group of 20 ascendant young American leaders overseas for similar four- to five-week fellowship to one or two countries, half of them to China under the Zhi-Xing China Eisenhower Fellowships Program. In 2020, EF launched the Global Scholars Program, which sends four university graduates abroad.

== Fellows ==
Since the organization's founding, nearly 2,000 men and women have been awarded fellowships. Fellows are identified by committees in 48 countries and six U.S. locales (New England, Philadelphia, Research Triangle-NC, St. Louis, Chicago and Los Angeles). They identify men and women who have positions of substantial influence in their fields.

=== 1950s–1970s ===
Sixteen fellowships were awarded in 1954 to three Americans and thirteen men from overseas. Initially, all funds came from the fundraising efforts of the EF Board of Trustees, but a ten-year $600,000 grant from the Ford Foundation was granted in 1956.

Each year's program included at least two seminars where Fellows shared experiences. It has yearly newsletters and three international alumni conferences. In 1961, the first Eisenhower regional conference was held in Geneva, Switzerland, and in the same year, the first female Fellow, Dr. Pilar G. Villegas, was named. In 1963, the USA Fellow program was suspended temporarily.

As the U.S. celebrated its bicentennial in 1976, 101 Fellows from 56 countries convened in San Francisco for EF's First World Forum. In 1977, President Gerald Ford was appointed president.

=== 1980s–1990s ===
President Gerald Ford and John Eisenhower helped the company get a grant from the U.S. Congress for $7.5 million. In 1986, the first Single Nation Program was introduced under the leadership of Theodore Friend, EEF President. Prior to 1986, Multi-Nation Programs had only allowed one fellowship to be granted to each participating country. The Single Nation Program was launched in 1986. In 1988, the first Dwight D. Eisenhower Medal for Leadership and Service was awarded to Ambassadors Walter Annenberg and Thomas Watson Jr. In 1989, the USA Fellow Program returned after a 26-year hiatus, which brought EEF to three yearly programs (the Multi-Nation Program, the Single Nation Program, and the USA Fellow Program) with 50 Fellows participating.

EEF celebrated the centennial of President Eisenhower's birth in 1990 at its second World Forum called "From Fellowship to Partnership" in Philadelphia. Over two hundred Fellows from 63 countries gathered. In the next 18 years, eleven other countries hosted EF conferences. In 1991, legislation sponsored by Senator Bob Dole and Representative Pat Roberts established a permanent endowment for EEF in honor of President Eisenhower. A Single Nation Program in South Africa for nine Fellows was run in 1994 after the country elected its first democratic government.

=== 2000s ===
Eisenhower Fellowships developed additional programs and foci. In 2003, EF celebrated its 50th Multi Nation Program and 50th Anniversary Conference in Philadelphia called "Connecting Global Leaders." USA Fellows started choosing their fellowship destinations from a list of 27 countries on six continents. The Multi-Nation and Single-Nation programs continued, but the addition of Regional Programs, three in Asia, and one each in Latin America and the Middle East, were also implemented. In 2007 and 2009, two Common Interest Programs were introduced with Fellows from the United States and from overseas participating. In 2010, Eisenhower Fellowships held its first Women's Leadership Program.

== Awards ==
Annually, Fellows are recognized an honorary fellowship in the name of a member of the board of trustees.

=== Distinguished Fellow Award ===
In 2008, EF established the Distinguished Fellow Award to recognize network Fellows. It is presented at the Annual Meeting of the board of trustees. The awardees are:

- 2008: Eisenhower Fellows of the Republic of Ireland and Northern Ireland
- 2009: Nezir Kirdar, ‘57, Iraq and Turkey
- 2010: Sister Mary Scullion, ’02, U.S.
- 2011: Jeffrey Koo Sr., ’71, Taiwan
- 2012: Conrado Etchebarne, '62, Argentina
- 2013: Martin Burt, '94, Paraguay
- 2014: Alfonso Vegara, '87, Spain, and Philip Yeo, '87, Singapore
- 2015: Susan Baragwanath, '94, New Zealand
- 2016: Shahid Mahmud, '01, Pakistan
- 2017: Ariel "Ayi" Hernandez, '11, Philippines
- 2018: Mari Pangestu, '90, Indonesia
- 2019: Eisenhower Fellows of Sri Lanka
- 2020: Juan Jose Guemes, '11, Spain
- 2021: Anita Brown-Graham, '05, U.S.
- 2022: Raman Madhok, '04, India, and Rajshree Pathy, '00, India
- 2023: Irina Anghel-Enescu, '08, Romania
- 2024: Tin Huu Mai '13, Vietnam, and Nguyen Griffiths Thao, '13, Vietnam
- 2025: Miatta Gbanya '16, Liberia and Nuru Mugambi (posthumously), '16, Kenya
- 2026: Claire-Marie Le Guay '15, France

== Eisenhower Medal for Leadership and Service ==
In 1988, the EF Board of Trustees established the Dwight D. Eisenhower Medal for Leadership and Service. It is awarded annually to a business leader, statesperson, or other public figure. Notable recipients include Presidents Gerald Ford and George H. W. Bush, United States secretaries of state Colin Powell, Henry Kissinger and George Shultz, U.S. treasury secretary Douglas Dillon, Federal Reserve Board chairman Alan Greenspan, Nobel Prize winner and economist Dr. Amartya Sen, Professor Muhammad Yunus, and founding trustees ambassadors Walter H. Annenberg and Thomas J. Watson Jr. The Eisenhower Medal is conferred annually at a private gala dinner with Trustees, sponsors, and Fellows.

=== Recipients ===
- 1988: Ambassador Walter Annenberg, founding trustee of Eisenhower Fellowships; ambassador to the Court of St. James and Ambassador Thomas Watson Jr., founding trustee of Eisenhower Fellowships; former chairman, IBM; ambassador to the Soviet Union
- 1989: Robert Orville Anderson, former chairman of Eisenhower Fellowships; former CEO, ARCO
- 1990: Ambassador C. Douglas Dillon, ambassador to France and undersecretary of state under President Eisenhower; former secretary of the treasury
- 1991: Senator Mark Hatfield, Senate Committee on Foreign Relations; chairman, Senate Committee on Appropriations
- 1992: President Süleyman Demirel of Turkey, 1955 Eisenhower Fellow
- 1993: Honorable Donald Rumsfeld, former secretary of defense; former CEO of G.D. Searle and General Instrument Co.; former chairman, Eisenhower Fellowships
- 1994: No medal awarded
- 1995: Honorable Pat Roberts, representative of the First Congressional District, Kansas; chairman, House Committee on Agriculture
- 1996: President Gerald Ford, former chairman of Eisenhower Fellowships
- 1997: Theodore Friend, president emeritus of Eisenhower Fellowships; former President, Swarthmore College
- 1998: General Brent Scowcroft, former national security affairs director
- 1999: General Colin L. Powell, USA (ret.), former chairman, Joint Chiefs of Staff; former secretary of state
- 2000: Dr. Amartya Sen, Economist; 1998 Nobel Prize winner in Economics
- 2001: Honorable George P. Shultz, former U.S. secretary of state
- 2002: Katharine Graham, chairman of the executive committee, The Washington Post; Pulitzer Prize-winning author
- 2003: President George H. W. Bush, former chairman of Eisenhower Fellowships
- 2004: Dr. Alan Greenspan, chairman, board of governors of the Federal Reserve
- 2005: Honorable John C. Whitehead, chairman, AEA Investors; former chairman, Goldman, Sachs; former deputy secretary of state
- 2006: Honorable Henry Kissinger, former secretary of state; former chairman, Eisenhower Fellowships
- 2007: Honorable Lee H. Hamilton, president, Woodrow Wilson International Center for Scholars; former chairman, House Committee on Foreign Affairs
- 2008: Senator George J. Mitchell, chairman of the global board, DLA Piper; chancellor, Queen's University, Northern Ireland
- 2009: Professor Muhammad Yunus, founding and managing director, Grameen Bank
- 2010: James Baker, former U.S. secretary of the treasury; senior partner, Baker Botts; honorary chairman, James A. Baker III Institute for Public Policy, Rice University
- 2011: International Crisis Group
- 2012: Michelle Bachelet, executive director, UN Women; former president, Chile
- 2013: Senator Richard Lugar, former chair, Senate Foreign Relations Committee and Senator Sam Nunn, co-chair and CEO, the Nuclear Threat Initiative
- 2014: Dr. Abdul Razaque, founder and CEO, M-learning platform inc.
- 2015: International Rescue Committee
- 2016: Doctors Without Borders
- 2017: Governor Christine Todd Whitman
- 2018: David Eisenhower and Susan Eisenhower
- 2019: Senator John McCain (posthumously)
- 2021: Jamie Dimon
- 2022: Dr. Madeleine Albright (posthumously)
- 2023: Melinda French Gates
- 2024: Steven Spielberg
- 2025: David Rubenstein
- 2026: Ken Burns

== Organization ==
The governing body of the organization is the board of trustees, a group of more than seventy in business and public affairs currently chaired by Dr. Robert M. Gates. Prior chairs include General Colin L. Powell, U.S. (retired), Dr. Henry Kissinger, President George H.W. Bush, and President Gerald Ford. Eisenhower Fellowships is headquartered in Philadelphia, Pennsylvania.
