= Mbaracayú Forest Nature Reserve =

Protected area in Paraguay

- La Reserva Natural del Bosque Mbaracayú
- IUCN category II (national park)
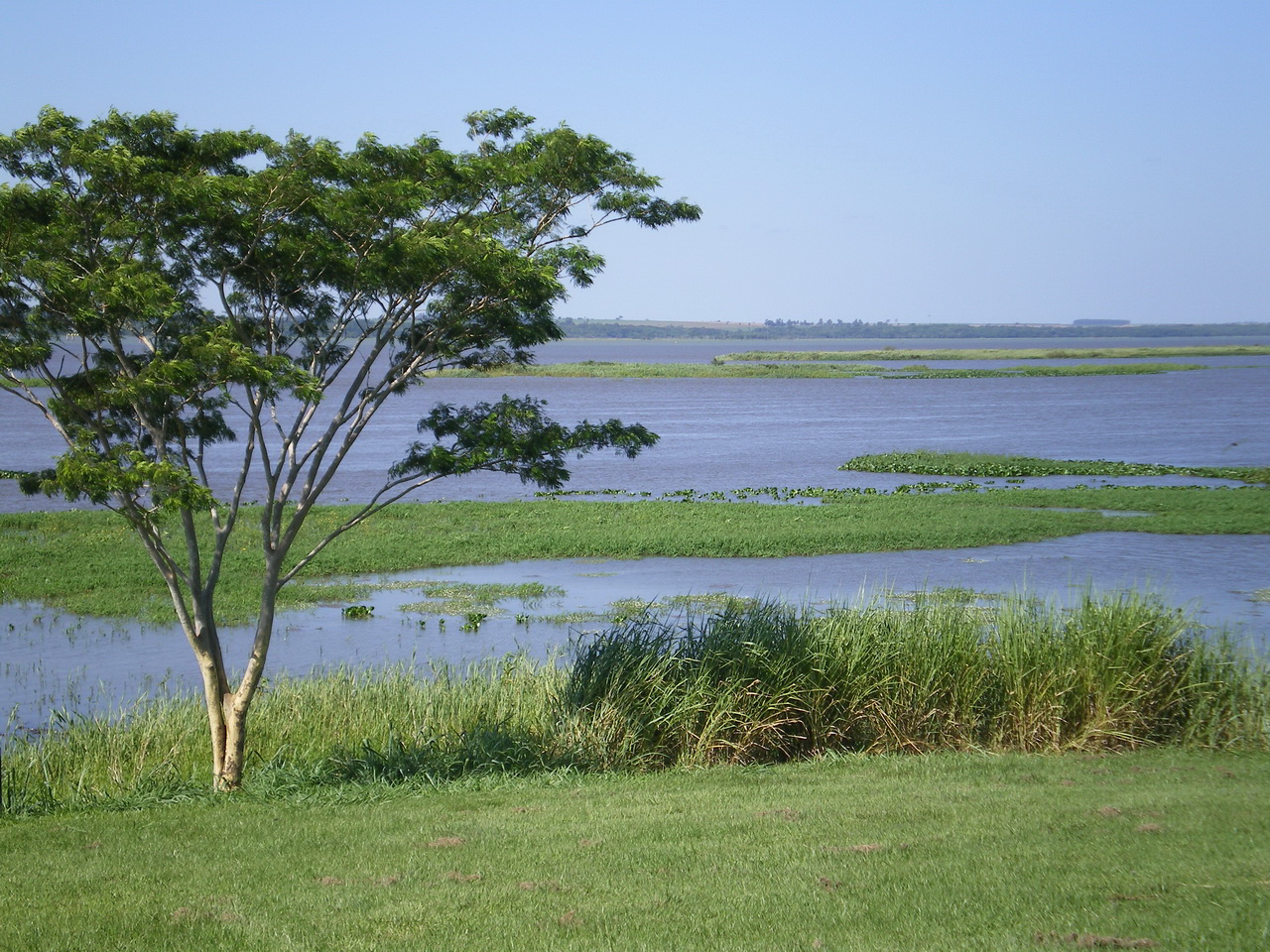
- Reserve in July 2008

- Location within Paraguay
- Nearest city: Ygatimí, Canindeyú Department
- Coordinates: 24°07′20″S 55°26′49″W
- Area: 64,405 hectares (159,150 acres)
- Designation: Protected area
- Created: 1991
- Administrator: Moises Bertoni Foundation

The Mbaracayú Forest Nature Reserve (Spanish: Reserva Natural del Bosque Mbaracayú) is a protected area in Paraguay. It is administered by the Moises Bertoni Foundation.

== Location ==
The Mbaracayú Forest Nature Reserve protects an area of high, humid subtropical forest in the upper Jejuí Guazú River basin. The 64,405 hectares (159,150 acres) reserve is the largest continuous remnant of the Alto Paraná Atlantic forests in Paraguay. It is part of the proposed Trinational Biodiversity Corridor, which aims to provide forest connections between conservation units in Brazil, Paraguay and Argentina in the Upper Paraná ecoregion.

== History ==
The Mbaracayú Forest Nature Reserve was established by an agreement among the government of Paraguay, the Moises Bertoni Foundation, UNESCO and The Nature Conservancy. This agreement was ratified in 1991 by Paraguayan National Law 112/91. The reserve was declared a Paraguayan heritage area dedicated in perpetuity to protect the forest, biological diversity and cultural resources, and to promote sustainable economic development. The reserve was submitted to UNESCO on 19 December 2003 as a proposed World Heritage Site.

== Environment ==
The Mbaracayú Forest Nature Reserve is located in an area surrounded by cattle ranches and small farms. The Cordillera de Mbaracayú mountain range crosses the northeastern corner of the reserve. There are many small, deep valleys with waterfalls and streams that feed the Jejuí Guazú River.

=== Climate ===
According to the Köppen climate classification system, the Mbaracayú Forest Nature Reserve has a humid subtropical climate (Cfa). Temperatures range from −2 °C (28 °F) in the dry winter to 42 °C (108 °F) in the wet summer; average annual temperature is 21 to 22 °C (70 to 72 °F). Average annual rainfall is 1,800 millimetres (71 in).

=== Flora and fauna ===
88% of the vegetation consists of riparian forest. The rest is wetland, pasture, lagoon, or cerrado. The area is subject to periodic flooding.

Commercially useful plants include Yerba mate (Ilex paraguariensis), Alsophila atrovirens, Anthurium plowmanii, Aspidosperma polyneuron and Phyrus species. Other plants include Tabebuia species, Cedrela fissilis, Balfourodendron riedelianum, Cordia tricótoma, Piptadenia species and Peltophorum dubium.

Fauna include jaguar (Panthera onca), South American tapir (Tapirus terrestris), maned wolf (Chrysocyon brachyurus), bush dog (Speothos venaticus) and other threatened or endangered species, neotropical otter (Lontra longicaudis) and giant armadillo (Priodontes maximus). The wetlands harbor yacare caiman (Caiman yacare) and broad-snouted caiman (Caiman latirostris). There are about 20 species of amphibians. There are over 400 species of birds including red-and-green macaw (Ara chloropterus), king vulture (Sarcoramphus papa), black-fronted piping guan (Pipile jacutinga), helmeted woodpecker (Celeus galeatus) and bare-throated bellbird (Procnias nudicollis). There is great diversity of butterflies and at least 219 species of ants.

== Sources ==
- Araújo Corte, Dione Angélica de; Valladares-Pádua, Cláudio Benedito (November 2007), Plano de Manejo da Estação Ecológica Mico-Leão-Preto (PDF) (in Portuguese), Brasília: ICMBio, archived from the original (PDF) on 2016-11-07
- Mbaracayu (in Spanish), Mbaracayu Natural Reserve
- "Mbaracayú Forest Nature Reserve", Tentative Lists, UNESCO
- Wehrle, Alejandro, "Reserva natural del bosque Mbaracayu", Salvémoslos (in Spanish), archived from the original on 2016-10-31
