= Fundación Paraguaya =

Paraguaryan social enterprise

- Fundación Paraguaya
- Formation: 1985; 41 years ago
- Founder: Martin Burt
- Location: Paraguay
- CEO: Martin Burt

Fundación Paraguaya is a Paraguaryan social enterprise. Founded in 1985, it seeks to develop solutions to poverty and unemployment, and proactively disseminate them throughout the world.

== History ==
Fundación Paraguaya was founded by Martin Burt in 1985, during the Stroessner dictatorship. They were the first microfinance institution in Paraguay, as well as a founding member of the Acción International microfinance network. They later adapted the Junior Achievement program's methodologies to serve underprivileged youth and teach them financial literacy. In 2003, the foundation took over a bankrupt boys' agricultural school, turning it into a financially self-sufficient school providing coed agricultural education. In 2009, they added a girls' school, and two more schools joined the educational model by 2011. They have committed to replicate the model in 50 schools globally.

== Recognition ==
Fundación Paraguaya has received a number of awards, grants, and distinctions, including the Skoll Award for Social Entrepreneurship. In 2018, the organization was awards the Juscelino Kubitschek Visionaries Award by the Inter American Development Bank.
