= Moises Bertoni Foundation =

Paraguayan environmental foundation

The Moises Bertoni Foundation (MBF) is an NGO focused on environmental conservation. It was established in January 1988 in memory of Moisés Santiago Bertoni, with the goal of contributing to the protection and sustainable development of natural resources in Paraguay.

The MBF is a nonprofit organization that specializes in sustainable development and manages the Mbaracayú Forest Nature Reserve (MFNR), the largest continuous remnant of the Alto Paraná Atlantic forests in Paraguay. The foundation focuses on promoting environmental, social, and economic development, in an effort to overcome the dominant paradigm of conservation as something separate from human activity.

The MBF maintains a team of zoologists and botanists dedicated to investigation and conservation of the MFNR. It also develops and operates educational programs, teaching members of the local population methods of sustainable development.

Raúl Gauto served as executive director of the MBF from 1988 until 1998, when Nancy Cardozo took over. She served until 2006, at which time Yan Speranza became director.

== See also ==
- Scientific Monument Moises Bertoni
