= State of World Liberty Index =

Ranking of countries by economic and personal freedoms

The State of World Liberty Index was a ranking of countries according to the degree of economic and personal freedoms that their citizens enjoy. It was a compilation of several similar indices created by other organizations. The index's original author Nick Wilson defined freedom as "the ability for the individual to live their lives as they choose, as long as they do not infringe on the rights of others to do the same."

Only one report (the 2006 State of World Liberty Index, released 12 August 2006) was produced by the State of World Liberty Project and the original website is now defunct. However, Patrick Rhamey, professor in the Department of International Studies at the Virginia Military Institute, has updated the rankings through 2025 using the same concept, with some adjustments to the original method.

The index has been cited by human rights organisations, governments, pro-democracy groups, news organisations, and others.

== Methodology ==
The 2006 State of World Liberty Index was created by combining the rankings of four other indexes of world liberty into one: the "2005 Economic Freedom of the World" Index (Fraser Institute), the "2006 Index of Economic Freedom" (The Heritage Foundation), the "2005 Freedom in the World" index (Freedom House), and the "2005 Press Freedom Index" (Reporters Without Borders).

These reports are used to score countries in three categories: individual freedom, economic freedom, and government size plus taxation. These three scores are then averaged to give a country's overall score.

The 2012–2025 Rankings reproduce the original ranking concept using the same data sources, albeit adjusting the weighting of data to best capture the original intent of measuring "the ability of the individual to live their lives as they choose." Measures are also standardized appropriately given the different scales used across indices and the government burden category was condensed into the broader indicator of economic freedom.

Beginning in 2018, the ranking also includes a measure of how Conservative or Progressive a state is, defined as whether a state regulates either social or economic issues more heavily.

== 2025 rankings ==
In the 2025 index, Switzerland is ranked most free overall, while North Korea is last. Saudi Arabia is ranked most conservative, while Argentina is ranked most progressive.

Rank	Country
1	Switzerland
2	New Zealand
2	Ireland
4	Denmark
4	Luxembourg
4	Finland
4	Norway
8	Netherlands
8	Sweden
10	Canada
10	Estonia

Rank	Country
172	Iran
172	Myanmar
175	Eritrea
175	Yemen
175	Libya
177	Sudan
177	Cuba
178	Venezuela
179	Syria
180	North Korea
