= Social Progress Index =

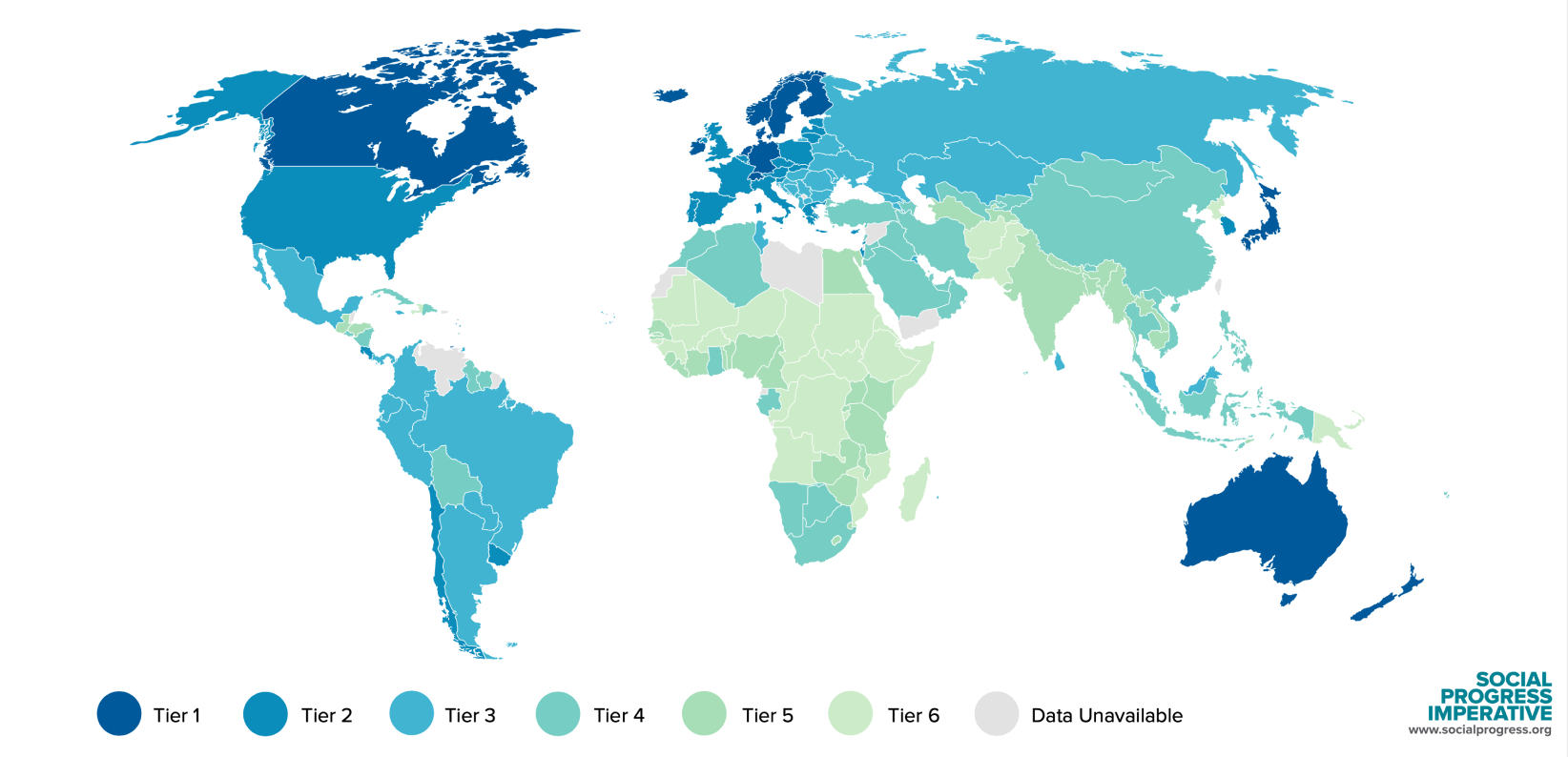
Map for Social Progress Index, 2018

The Social Progress Index, created by The Social Progress Imperative, is a comprehensive data insights tool that measures the real-life outcomes experienced by people across a wide range of social and environmental indicators. The Social Progress Index is distinct from other approaches to Beyond GDP measurement in that it explicitly excludes indicators of economic performance.

The 2025 Global Social Progress Index provides data insights for 170+ countries from 2011 to 2024 and is updated annually. The Social Progress Index methodology is also used at local, subnational, and sector-specific levels. These tailored indices apply the same core framework to assess progress in regions, cities, or even specific issues, offering actionable insights for policymakers, community leaders, and organizations seeking to drive equitable and inclusive development.

== History ==
The Social Progress Index was created in 2013 by the Skoll Foundation to celebrate its 10th year anniversary. This new index was created because its founders found the Human Development Index and the Happiness Index to be insufficient. Paraguay was the first country to adopt the SPI's framework.

== Approach ==
The Social Progress Index combines three dimensions: 1. Basic needs; 2. Foundation of Well-being; 3. Opportunity.

Social Progress is defined as a society's capacity to meet basic human needs, create building blocks for citizens to improve their quality of life, and allow individuals to reach their full potential. Each dimension includes four components, which are each composed of specific outcome indicators.

The four key features of the Social Progress Index are: 1. Exclusively social and environmental indicators; 2. Outcomes not inputs; 3. Holistic and relevant to all countries; 4. Actionable.

== Findings and datasets ==
Insights from the 2025 Global Social Progress Index show that economic performance alone does not determine social outcomes. Countries with similar levels of GDP per capita often show significant differences in social progress. For example, while Denmark and the United States have comparable GDP per capita, Denmark scores 10 points higher in social progress.

Several advanced economies, including Australia, Canada, and the U.S., rank among the least improved since 2011. The US slipped from the 19th position in 2011 to the 28th position in 2020.

Since 2020, global progress has largely stalled due to the COVID-19 pandemic and a decline in rights and freedoms. Today, two-thirds of the world’s population lives in countries where social progress has stagnated or declined.

Much of the data is freely available and can be used to support research, inform decision-making, and develop tailored strategies for your work. Premium access offers additional visualizations and data insights, expanded and downloadable datasets, country profiles and information by region.

== Examination ==
The Global Social Progress Index does not currently include measures of subjective life satisfaction or psychological well-being. This is a design decision in the construction of the index as a measure of social outcomes rather than subjective wellbeing. The inter-relationship between GDP, social progress and life satisfaction is explored further in academic papers. Other critics point out that "there remain certain dimensions that are currently not included in the SPI. These are the concentration of wealth in the top 1 percent of the population, efficiency of the judicial system, and quality of the transportation infrastructure." The exclusion of some of these indicators, such as wealth inequality, reflects the design decision to exclude economic indicators, and others, such as judicial efficiency or mental health, are because of the absence of reliable, comparable data.

== See also ==
- Broad measures of economic progress
- ESG
- Happiness economics
- Postmaterialism
- Psychometrics

== References and media ==
- "Data - Social Progress Index - Methodology". socialprogress.org/. Social Progress Imperative
- "Global Index: Results". Social Progress Imperative.
- Ruggeri, Amanda (January 12, 2018). "How can you measure what makes a country great?". BBC.
- “Social Progress Index: States and Districts of India | Social Progress Imperative.” Socialprogress.org, 2023, https://www.socialprogress.org/thematic-webpages/social-progress-index-states-and-districts-of-india.
- TED: “How We Can Make the World a Better Place by 2030 | Michael Green
- TED: “The Global Goals We’ve Made Progress on -- and the Ones We Haven’t | Michael Green
- TED: What the Social Progress Index Can Reveal about Your Country. | Michael Green
