= José Torres =

José Torres may refer to:

== Music ==
- José de Torres (1665–1738), Spanish composer
- José Torres (percussionist) (born 1958), Cuban-Polish percussionist
- Tomatito (José Fernández Torres, born 1958), Spanish flamenco guitarist

== Politics ==
- José Sigona Torres (born 1953), Mexican politician
- Joey Torres (Jose Torres, born 1958), American politician
- José Pichy Torres Zamora (born 1971), Puerto Rican politician
- José Torres Ramírez (born 1972), Puerto Rican politician
- José Alfredo Torres Huitrón (born 1973), Mexican politician

== Sport ==
- Gacho Torres (José Torres, 1896–1963), Puerto Rican baseball player
- José Torres (runner) (1903–?), Mexican long-distance runner
- José Torres (boxer) (1936–2009), Puerto Rican Olympic and professional boxer
- José Torres (footballer, born 1938) (1938–2010), Portuguese footballer
- José Torres Laboy (born 1971), Puerto Rican Olympic sport shooter
- José Anthony Torres (born 1972), Panamanian footballer
- Monster Pain (José Torres, born 1982), Puerto Rican professional wrestler
- José Francisco Torres (born 1987), American soccer player
- Jose Torres (fighter) (born 1992), American mixed martial artist
- José Torres (pitcher) (born 1993), Venezuelan MLB baseball player
- José Luis Torres (footballer, born 1994), Uruguayan footballer
- José Luis Torres (footballer, born 1995), Argentine footballer
- José Torres (cyclist) (born 1995), Argentine BMX cyclist

== Others ==
- José Antonio Torres Martinó (1916–2011), Puerto Rican painter, artist, journalist and writer
- José Ortega Torres (born 1943), Spanish poet
- José Antonio Torres (Cuban journalist) (fl. 1990–2015), Cuban journalist
- José Torres (educator) (1960–2025), American educator
- José Antonio Torres (director) (born 1973), Mexican film director, producer, and musician
- José Filipe Torres (born 1976), Portuguese branding consultant
- José Torres (actor) (born 1925), Venezuelan actor

== See also ==
- Joe Torres (disambiguation)
