= José Antonio Torres =

José Antonio Torres may refer to:

- José Antonio Torres (director) (born 1973), Mexican film director, producer, and musician
- José Antonio Torres (Cuban journalist) (graduated college 1990), Cuban journalist
- José Antonio Torres Martinó (1916–2011), Puerto Rican painter, artist, journalist and writer
- José Antonio Torres (general) (1755–1812), Mexican insurgent (es)
