= Spoken from the Heart =

2010 memoir by Laura Bush

- Author: Laura Bush
- Language: English
- Genre: Memoir
- Publisher: Scribner's
- Publication date: May 2010
- Publication place: United States
- Pages: 464
- ISBN: 978-1439155202

Spoken from the Heart is a memoir by United States First Lady Laura Bush, published in 2010. Journalist Lyric Winik assisted Bush in writing the book.

== Contents ==
Bush recounts the car accident that she caused at the age 17 in which a friend and classmate was killed and Bush was also scarred. She writes that the 1963 crash "is a guilt I will carry for the rest of my life".

She describes an idyllic life growing up in Midland, Texas. She calls the town "a place of ice cream sundaes… and Saturday morning pony rides." After relating the beginning of her relationship with George W. Bush, she recalls the jibe made by a neighbor that "Can you imagine? The most eligible bachelor in Midland marrying the old maid of Midland?"

She expresses support for Bush administration decisions such as the invasion of Iraq. She concludes: "I am proud that, as president, George acted on principle, that he put our country first and himself last." She notes disagreements over some issues. She specifically recounts asking her husband "about not making gay marriage a significant issue" in the 2004 re-election campaign, while "family values" in opposition to same-sex marriage was chosen as a defining Bush theme.

== Reviews ==
Reviewing the book for The New York Times, Michiko Kakutani wrote: "For the most part, however, the White House portions of this book feel carefully prepared and vetted: Mrs. Bush lays out a predictable defense of her husband’s decision to invade Iraq and his decision not to visit New Orleans in the immediate aftermath of Katrina, and she offers only the blandest portraits of administration figures like Dick Cheney, Donald H. Rumsfeld and Karl Rove. In these chapters there is no daylight between Laura Bush and her highly groomed role as first lady."

Melissa Benn wrote a review in The Guardian and noted: "Spoken from the Heart perfectly fits the personal-is-political template. There is a lot of detail of designer dresses worn, official meals enjoyed, furniture and wallpaper restored, tours conducted and, of course, important political people encountered. Tony and Cherie are particular favourites, as is Nicolas Sarkozy, of all people. Vladimir Putin is given the occasional dressing down on the importance of democracy. Barack Obama is chided for his personal attacks on George during the 2008 campaign. Dick Cheney, Karl Rove and "Condi" Rice are all portrayed as utterly delightful."

Entertainment Weekly published a review by Tina Jordan, who wrote: "Anyone who wants to know what makes Laura Bush tick will come away disappointed." Jordan commented as well that Bush "seems almost a shadowy spectator in her own memoir", but Jordan praised the "sweetness and poignancy" of the first few sections of the book covering Bush's childhood and marriage.

Elaine Showalter published a review in The Daily Telegraph, in which she noted "this is a calculated and highly controlled autobiography, spoken from the heart, maybe, but more accurately titled 'Written from the Head'."

The Washington Post published a review by Ruth Marcus, who stated: "Laura Bush's autobiography, Spoken From the Heart, begins promisingly enough for anyone hoping to penetrate that [her] surface.

== See also ==
- We Are Afghan Women: Voices of Hope
