= American patriotic music =

Music reflecting the history and culture of the United States

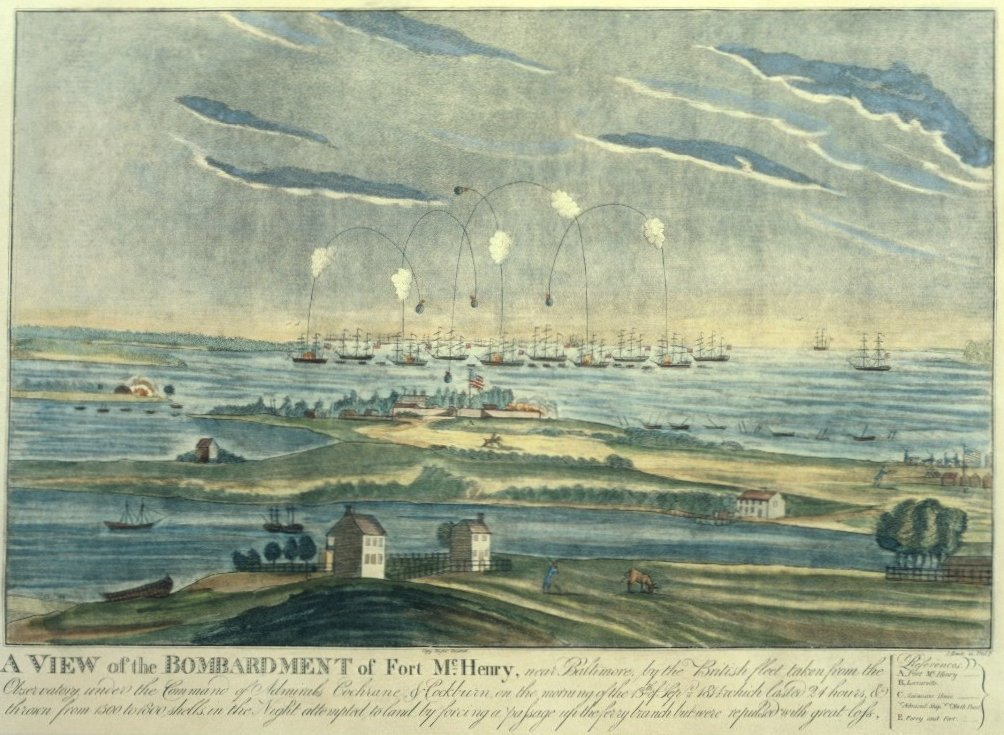
The bombardment of Fort McHenry that inspired Francis Scott Key to write the lyrics for the national anthem

American patriotic music is a part of the culture and history of the United States since its foundation in the 18th century. It has served to encourage feelings of honor both for the country's forefathers and for national unity. They include hymns, military themes, national songs, and musical numbers from stage and screen, as well as others adapted from many poems. Much of American patriotic music owes its origins to six main wars: the American Revolution, the American Indian Wars, the War of 1812, the Mexican–American War, the American Civil War, and the Spanish–American War. During the period prior to American independence, much of the country's patriotic music was aligned with the political ambitions of the British in the new land. And so, several songs are tied with the country's British origin.

Columbian Anthem
American patriotic song recorded in the 1890's

== Colonial Era ==
Written by Founding Father John Dickinson in 1768 to the music of William Boyce's "Heart of Oak", "The Liberty Song" is perhaps the first patriotic song ever written in America. It contains the line "by uniting we stand, by dividing we fall", which was an overture to the feelings of common blood and origin the Americans had while fighting the French and Indian War, and also the first recorded use of the sentiment. Additional songs gained prominence in keeping with British and American unity, namely "The British Grenadiers" and "God Save the King". However, with the War of Independence, the tunes of the last two were combined with new lyrics while "Yankee Doodle", long a tune and lyric addressed to the unique American population descended from the British, became widely popular. Political and cultural links between the colony and Great Britain perhaps explains the ongoing popularity of the two former tunes, despite the war for independence. "Hail Columbia" was written for George Washington's inauguration. It served as an unofficial national anthem until 1931. It is still the vice presidential anthem today.

== 19th Century ==
In 1814, Washington lawyer Francis Scott Key wrote a poem entitled "Defence of Fort McHenry" after witnessing the bombardment of Fort McHenry in the Chesapeake Bay during the War of 1812. Once again, owing to the American origins from British nationals, the lyrics were later set to music common to British and American sailors. But it eventually became world-famous as "The Star-Spangled Banner," and it was designated the United States' official national anthem in 1931.

After centuries of struggling and fighting with hostile Native Americans, as well as diseases and forces of nature, many American residents had breached the Appalachian mountain chain, and then pushed into the wide open areas of the Far West. Thus, such songs as "My Country, 'Tis of Thee," composed in 1831, have as themes natural wonder combined with freedom and liberty. Others, such as "America the Beautiful," express appreciation for the natural beauty of the United States and the hope for a better nation, wrote one hymn editor. However, in contrast to "My Country, 'Tis of Thee" and "The Star-Spangled Banner", "America the Beautiful" does not have the triumphalism found in many patriotic American songs. It was originally a poem composed by Katharine Lee Bates after she had experienced the view from Pikes Peak of fertile ground as far as the eye could see. It was sung to a variety of tunes until the present one, written as a hymn tune in 1882 by Samuel Ward, became associated with it.

In 1843, when "Columbia, the Gem of the Ocean" was first written, it was the most popular during the Civil War. It mostly praises the Army and Navy in a rousing manner. It was later commonly used in many animated cartoons. In the 21st Century, the melody is occasionally used, and the lyrics rarely.

During the events leading up to the American Civil War, both the North and the South generated a number of songs to stir up patriotic sentiments, such as "Battle Hymn of the Republic" and "Dixie". However, after the Civil War, the sentiments of most patriotic songs were geared to rebuilding and consolidating the United States. During the Spanish–American War in 1898, many songwriters continued to write patriotic tunes that honored America's soldiers and rallied citizens in support of the war. Such songs as "Brave Dewey and His Men" and "The Charge of the Roosevelt Riders" lauded Commodore George Dewey and Theodore Roosevelt. Around this time, John Philip Sousa began composing many of his most famous patriotic marches, including "The Stars and Stripes Forever" and "The Washington Post March." Such songs as "The Black KPs", likely labelled racist and offensive by modern listeners, were intended to rally the public behind the war effort.

== 20th and 21st Centuries ==
World War I produced many patriotic American songs, such as "Over There", written by popular songwriter George M. Cohan. Cohan composed the song on April 6, 1917, when he saw some headlines announcing America's entry into the war. Cohan is also famous for penning "Yankee Doodle Dandy," an over-the-top parody of patriotic music. "God Bless America", a song written by Irving Berlin in 1918, is sometimes considered an unofficial national anthem of the United States. It is often performed at sporting events alongside (or, in some rare cases, such as Ronan Tynan, in place of) "The Star-Spangled Banner". In 1940, songwriter Woody Guthrie wrote "This Land is Your Land" in response to his dislike of "God Bless America", calling it unrealistic and complacent. World War II produced a significant number of patriotic songs in the Big Band and Swing format. Popular patriotic songs of the time included "Remember Pearl Harbor". Patriotic songs in the latter half of the 20th Century include "Ballad of the Green Berets" during the Vietnam War, Lee Greenwood's "God Bless the USA" during the years of the first Gulf War and again after the September 11, 2001 attacks.

== See also ==
- Canadian patriotic music
- List of anthems of non-sovereign countries, regions and territories
- List of historical national anthems
- National Anthem Project
