= Arash Abizadeh =

Canadian philosopher

Arash Abizadeh FRSC
- Born: Shiraz, Iran

Education
- Education: University of Winnipeg (BA, economics and political science); Queen's College, Oxford (MPhil); Harvard University Department of Government (PhD)
- Thesis: Rhetoric, the Passions, and Difference in Discursive Democracy (2001)
- Doctoral advisor: Seyla Benhabib

Philosophical work
- Era: 21st-century philosophy
- Region: Western philosophy
- School: Analytic philosophy
- Institutions: McGill University
- Main interests: Political philosophy, early modern philosophy
- Website: http://abizadeh.wixsite.com/arash

Arash Abizadeh (Persian: آرش ابی‌زاده) FRSC is an Iranian-Canadian philosopher, R.B. Angus Professor of Political Science, Chair of the Department of Political Science, and Associate Member of the Department of Philosophy at McGill University. He is known for his expertise on democratic theory, political and social power, migration and border control, and Thomas Hobbes. He is a recipient of a Rhodes Scholarship (1994).

As a democratic theorist he is known for his advocacy of sortition, and has proposed the adoption of random selection to fill seats in the Senate of Canada.

In a highly influential and widely discussed article he argued that states have no right to unilaterally control their own borders based on the principle of democratic legitimacy.

== Books ==
- Hobbes and the Two Faces of Ethics, Cambridge University Press, 2018, ISBN 1108417299

== See also ==
- Ethnic group
- Pistis
- Civic nationalism
- National myth
- Nationalism
- Johann Gottlieb Fichte
- The Ethics of Immigration
- Bahá'í administration
- Branding national myths and symbols
