= Laura Bush =

First Lady of the United States from 2001 to 2009

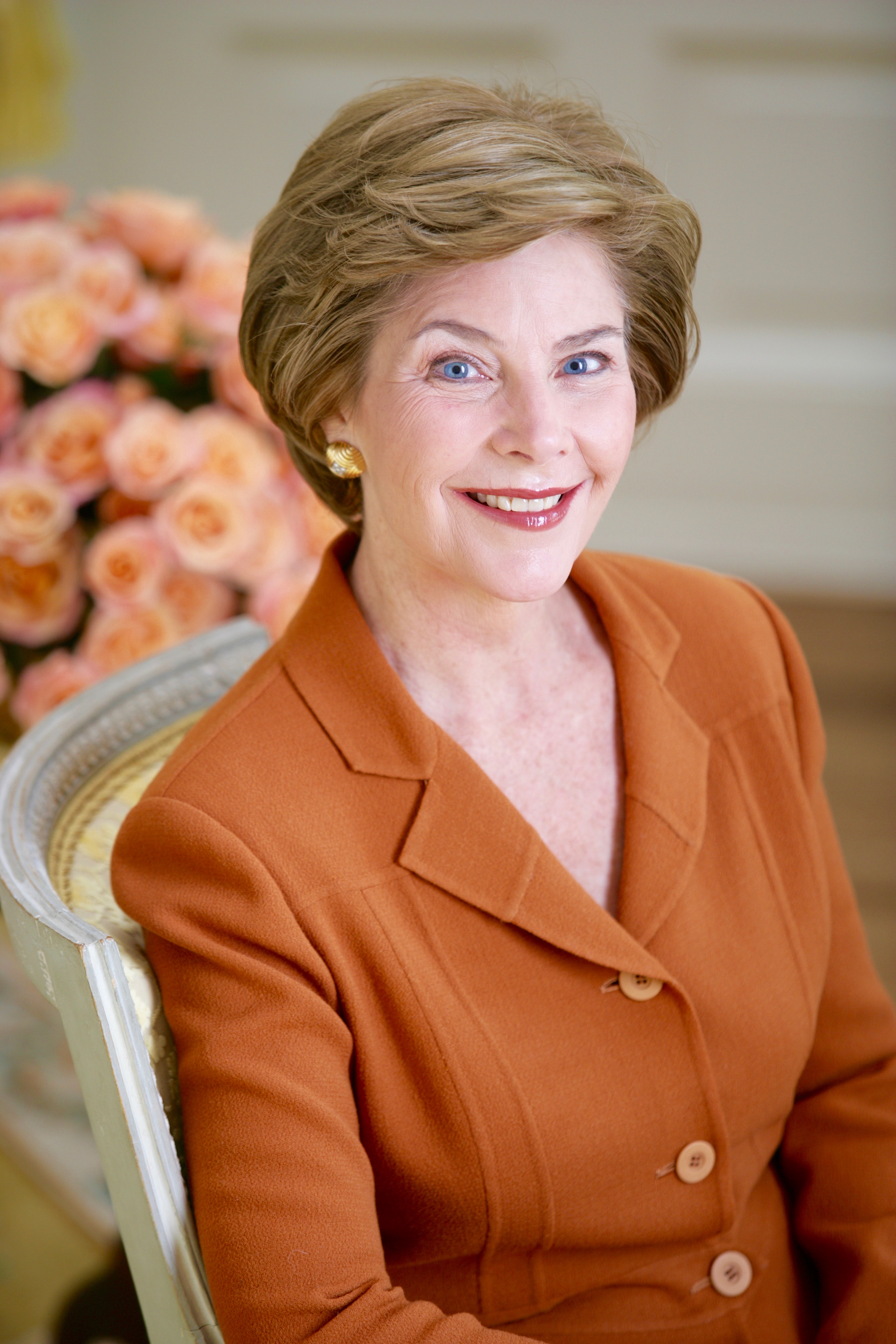
- Official portrait, 2005

First Lady of the United States
- In role January 20, 2001 – January 20, 2009
- President: George W. Bush
- Preceded by: Hillary Clinton
- Succeeded by: Michelle Obama

First Lady of Texas
- In role January 17, 1995 – December 21, 2000
- Governor: George W. Bush
- Preceded by: Rita Crocker Clements (1991)
- Succeeded by: Anita Thigpen Perry

Personal details
- Born: Laura Lane Welch; November 4, 1946 (age 80) Midland, Texas, U.S.
- Party: Republican
- Spouse: George W. Bush (m. 1977)
- Children: Barbara; Jenna
- Relatives: Bush family (by marriage)
- Education: Southern Methodist University (BS); University of Texas at Austin (MLS)
- Laura Bush's voice Bush on the treatment of children and women by the Taliban; Recorded November 15, 2001

Laura Lane Welch Bush (née Welch; born November 4, 1946) is an American educator who was the first lady of the United States from 2001 to 2009 as the wife of George W. Bush, the 43rd president of the United States. Bush was also the first lady of Texas from 1995 to 2000 when her husband was governor.

Born in Midland, Texas, Bush graduated from Southern Methodist University in 1968 with a bachelor's degree in education, and took a job as a second grade teacher. After attaining her master's degree in library science at the University of Texas at Austin, she was employed as a librarian. Bush met her future husband, George W. Bush, in 1977, and they were married later that year. The couple had twin daughters, Barbara and Jenna in 1981. Bush's political involvement began during her marriage. She campaigned with her husband during his unsuccessful 1978 run for the United States Congress, and later for his successful Texas gubernatorial campaign.

As First Lady of Texas, Bush implemented many initiatives focused on health, education, and literacy. From 1999 to 2000, she aided her husband in campaigning for the presidency in several ways, such as delivering a prominent address at the 2000 Republican National Convention, which gained her national attention. She became first lady after her husband was inaugurated as president on January 20, 2001.

Polled by the Gallup Organization as one of the most popular first ladies, Bush was involved in national and global concerns during her tenure. She continued to advance her trademark interests of education and literacy by establishing the annual National Book Festival in 2001. She encouraged education on a worldwide scale. She also advanced women's causes through the Heart Truth and Susan G. Komen for the Cure organizations. She represented the United States during her foreign trips, which tended to focus on HIV/AIDS and malaria awareness.

== Early life and education ==
Laura Lane Welch was born on November 4, 1946, at Midland Memorial Hospital in Midland, Texas, the only child of Harold Bruce Welch and Jenna Louise Welch (née Hawkins). She is of English, French, and Swiss ancestry.

Her father was a house builder and later successful real estate developer, while her mother worked as the bookkeeper for her father's business. Early on, her parents encouraged her to read, leading to what would become her love of reading. She said, "I learned [how important reading is] at home from my mother. When I was a little girl, my mother would read stories to me. I have loved books and going to the library ever since. In the summer, I liked to spend afternoons reading in the library. I enjoyed the Little House on the Prairie and Little Women books, and many others ... Reading gives you enjoyment throughout your life." Bush has also credited her second grade teacher, Charlene Gnagy, for inspiring her interest in education.

On the night of November 6, 1963, two days after her 17th birthday, Laura Bush ran a stop sign and struck another car, killing its driver. The victim was her classmate Michael Dutton Douglas. By some accounts, Douglas had been Bush's boyfriend at one time, but she stated that he was not her boyfriend at that time but rather a very close friend. Bush and her passenger, both 17, were treated for minor injuries. According to the accident report released by the city of Midland in 2000, in response to an open-records request, she was not charged in the incident. In 2000 Laura Bush's spokesman said, "It was a very tragic accident that deeply affected the families and was very painful for all involved, including the community at large." In her book Spoken from the Heart, she said that the crash caused her to lose her faith "for many, many years".

She attended James Bowie Elementary School, San Jacinto Junior High School, and Robert E. Lee High School in Midland. She graduated from Lee in 1964 and went on to attend Southern Methodist University in Dallas where she was a member of Kappa Alpha Theta. She graduated in 1968 with a Bachelor of Science degree in education.

She worked as a counselor at Camp Mystic, a Christian summer camp for girls, while she was in college. After graduating from SMU, she began her career as a school teacher at Longfellow Elementary School in the Dallas Independent School District. She then taught for three years at John F. Kennedy Elementary School, a Houston Independent School District school in Houston, until 1972.

In 1973, Bush attained a Master of Science degree in library science from the University of Texas at Austin. She was soon employed as a librarian at the Kashmere Gardens Branch at the Houston Public Library. The following year, she moved back to Austin and took another job as a librarian in the Austin Independent School District school Dawson Elementary until 1977. She reflected on her employment experiences to a group of children in 2003, saying, "I worked as a teacher and librarian and I learned how important reading is in school and in life."

== Personal life ==
Bush met her husband in July 1977 when mutual friends Joe and Jan O'Neill invited them to a backyard barbecue at their home. He proposed to her at the end of September and they were married on November 5 of that year, the day after her 31st birthday, at the First United Methodist Church in Midland, the same church in which she had been baptized. The couple honeymooned in Cozumel, Mexico. George W. Bush detailed his choice to marry Laura as the "best decision of [his] life". Laura, an only child, said she gained "brothers and sisters and wonderful in-laws" who all accepted her after she wed George W. Bush.

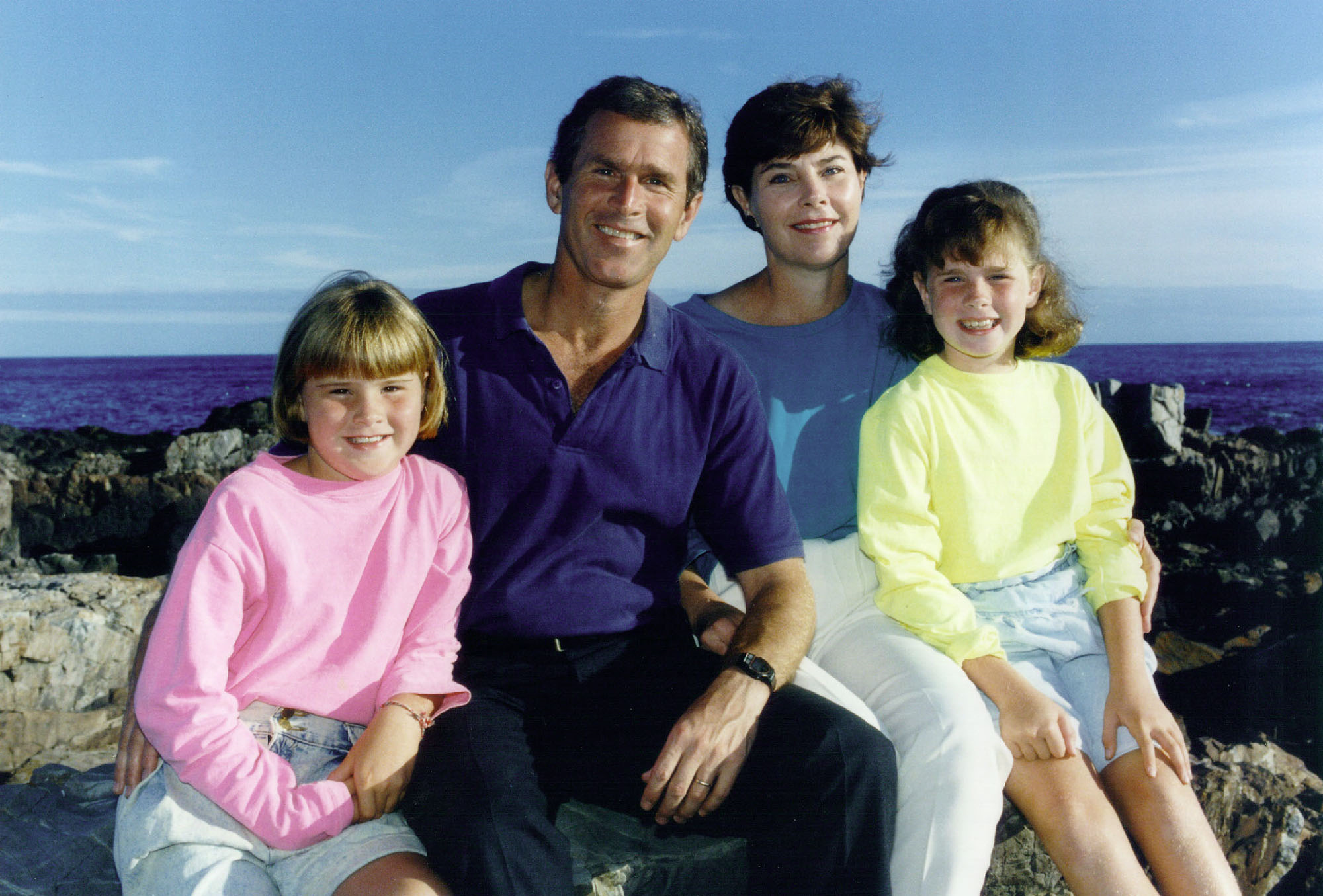
Laura and George W. Bush with their daughters Jenna and Barbara Bush, Kennebunkport, 1990

The year after their marriage, the couple began campaigning for George W. Bush's 1978 Congressional candidacy. According to George Bush, when he asked her to marry him, she had said, "Yes. But only if you promise me that I'll never have to make a campaign speech." She soon relented and gave her first stump speech for him in 1978 on the courthouse steps in Muleshoe, Texas. After narrowly winning the primary, he lost the general election.

Bush attended the inauguration of her father-in-law George H. W. Bush as Ronald Reagan's vice-president in January 1981, after Reagan won the 1980 United States presidential election. She credited her father-in-law's election to the vice presidency with giving her and her husband national exposure.

The Bushes had tried to conceive for three years, but pregnancy did not happen easily. On November 25, 1981, Laura Bush gave birth to fraternal twin daughters, Barbara and Jenna. The twins were born five weeks early by an emergency Caesarean section in Baylor University Medical Center in Dallas, Texas, as Laura had developed life-threatening pre-eclampsia (toxemia).

George W. Bush credited his wife with his decision to stop drinking in 1986. She reflected that she thought her husband "was drinking too much" amid her knowing it was not his desired way of living. Approaching him, she related that her father had been alcoholic and it was not a pattern she wished to repeat in their family. She is also credited with having a stabilizing effect on his private life. According to People magazine reporter Jane Simms Podesta, "She is the steel in his back. She is a civilizing influence on him. I think she built him, in many ways, into the person he is today."

Bush traveled to Kuwait in April 1993, accompanying her in-laws as well as brothers-in-law Jeb and Marvin Bush after former president Bush was invited to return to the Middle East for the first time since his presidency.

Several times a year, Bush and her husband travel to their sprawling family estate, the Bush compound, better known as Walker's Point. Located in Kennebunkport, Maine, the compound is where Bush family gatherings have been held for nearly 100 years.

== First Lady of Texas (1995–2000) ==
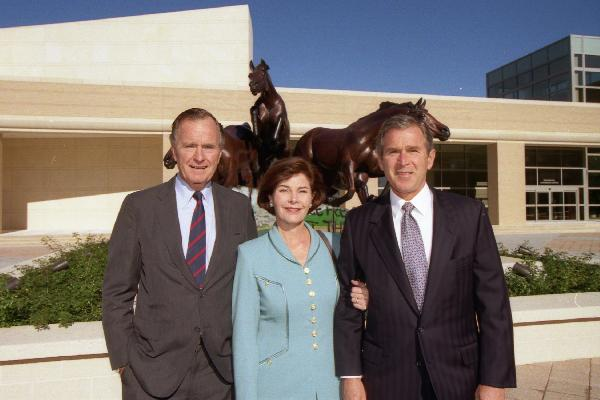
Laura Bush with husband Governor George W. (right) and father-in-law George H. W. (left) at the dedication of the George H. W. Bush Presidential Library, 1997

Bush became the first lady of Texas when her husband was elected as the governor of Texas and served as first lady of that state from January 17, 1995, to December 21, 2000. When asked about her interest in politics, she responded "It doesn't drive me."

Though during her years in the Governor's Mansion, she did not hold a single formal event, Laura worked for women's and children's causes including health, education, and literacy. She implemented four major initiatives: Take Time For Kids, an awareness campaign to educate parents and caregivers on parenting; family literacy, through cooperation with the Barbara Bush Foundation for Family Literacy, she urged Texas communities to establish family literacy programs; Reach Out and Read, a pediatric reading program; and Ready to Read, an early childhood educational program.

She raised money for public libraries through her establishment of the Texas Book Festival, in 1995. She established the First Lady's Family Literacy Initiative, which encouraged families to read together. Bush further established "Rainbow Rooms" across the state, in an effort to provide emergency services for neglected or abused children. Through this, she promoted the Adopt-a-Caseworker Program to provide support for Child Protective Services. She used her position to advocate Alzheimer's disease and breast cancer awareness as well.

Her husband announced his campaign for President of the United States in mid-1999, something that she agreed to. She did say, however, that she had never dreamed that he would run for office. The Bush campaign worked to assure voters that as First Lady, she would not seek to emulate then-First Lady Hillary Clinton, who had faced controversy for leading several policy initiatives from within the White House despite being unelected. In July, she delivered a keynote address to the delegates at the 2000 Republican National Convention, which put her on the national stage.

== First Lady of the United States (2001–2009) ==
As First Lady, Bush was involved in issues of concern to children and women, both nationally and internationally. Her major initiatives included education and women's health.

=== Education and children and the National Book Festival ===
Early into the administration, Bush made it known that she would focus much of her attention on education. This included recruiting highly qualified teachers to ensure that young children would be taught well. She also focused on early child development.

In 2001, to promote reading and education, she partnered with the Library of Congress to launch the annual National Book Festival. More than 60 organizations that promote reading, literacy, and libraries—including the National Basketball Association participated. Bush served as Honorary Chair from 2001 to 2008.

In January 2002, Bush testified before the Senate Committee on Education, asking for higher teachers' salaries and better training for Head Start programs. She is also credited with creating a national initiative called "Ready to Read, Ready to Learn", which promotes reading at a young age. To promote American patriotic heritage in schools, she helped launch the National Anthem Project. In 2006, Bush and media executives worked together to provide a $500,000 grant for school libraries along the Gulf Coast which had been devastated by Hurricanes Katrina and Rita.

Immediately following the September 11, 2001 attacks, Bush spoke regarding America's children:

"We need to reassure our children that they are safe in their homes and schools. We need to reassure them that many people love them and care for them, and that while there are some bad people in the world, there are many more good people."

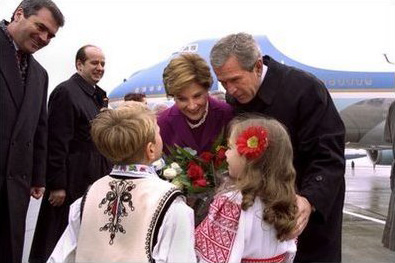
Romanian children greet President and Mrs. Bush upon their landing in Bucharest, 2002.

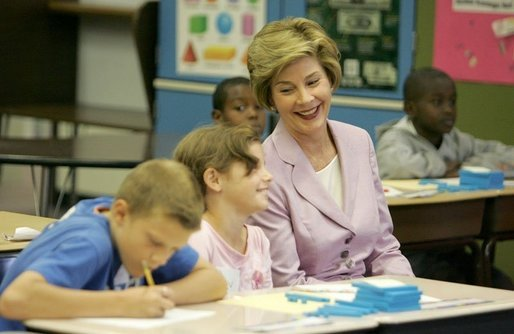
The first lady shares a laugh with fifth graders in Des Moines, Iowa, 2005.

The following day, she composed open letters to America's families, focusing on elementary and middle school students, which she distributed through state education officials. She took an interest in mitigating the emotional effects of the attacks on children, particularly the disturbing images repeatedly replayed on television. On the one-year anniversary, she encouraged parents to instead read to their children, and perhaps light a candle in memoriam, saying, "Don't let your children see the images, especially on September 11, when you know it'll probably be on television again and again – the plane hitting the building or the buildings falling."

Later in her tenure, she was honored by the United Nations, as the body named her honorary ambassador for the United Nations' Decade of Literacy. In this position, she announced that she would host a Conference on Global Literacy. The conference, held in September 2006, encouraged a constant effort to promote literacy and highlighted many successful literacy programs. She coordinated this as a result of her many trips abroad where she witnessed how literacy benefited children in poorer nations.

On July 28, 2008, she visited Carl Sandburg Home National Historic Site in Flat Rock, North Carolina, where she met with superintendent Connie Backlund and the Friends of Carl Sandburg Home's President Linda Holt as well as various students from Boys and Girls Club of Henderson County, North Carolina.

On October 3, 2008, she visited Laura Ingalls Wilder Historic Home and Museum where she praised her works such as Farmer Boy, These Happy Golden Years and Little House on the Prairie, the last of which she had felt an association with as a child. During the same Laura Ingalls Wilder's estate visit, she said that she read her books to her daughters and gave the writer Save America's Treasures grant.

=== September 11 attacks ===
On September 11, 2001, Bush had been hosting her in-laws George H. W. Bush and Barbara Bush at the White House and was scheduled to give a testimony to Congress on education. Instead, during the September 11 attacks, Bush was placed in an underground bunker. She was later met there by her husband upon his return from Florida.

Two weeks after the September 11 terrorist attacks, Bush inaugurated a music concert at the Kennedy Center, organized to raise funds for families of the victims. Though she received applause, she returned the compliment to members of the audience and added that although the event was tragic, Americans had deepened their appreciation "of life itself, how fragile it can be, what a gift it is and how much we need each other". Senator Ted Kennedy, who introduced Bush at the event, praised her and said he knew his late brother, President John F. Kennedy, would also be proud of her. Bush believes the September 11 attacks ignited the interest in the way Afghan women were treated.

=== Women's health and rights ===
Another of her signature issues were those relating to the health and well-being of women. She established the Women's Health and Wellness Initiative and became involved with two major campaigns.

Bush first became involved with The Heart Truth awareness campaign in 2003. It is an organization established by the National Heart, Lung, and Blood Institute to raise awareness about heart disease in women, and how to prevent the condition. She serves in the honorary position of ambassador for the program leading the federal government's effort to give women a "wake up call" about the risk of heart disease. She commented on the disease: "Like many women, I assumed heart disease was a man's disease and cancer was what we would fear the most. Yet heart disease kills more women in our country than all forms of cancer combined. When it comes to heart disease, education, prevention, and even a little red dress can save lives." She has undertaken a signature personal element of traveling around the country and talking to women at hospital and community events featuring the experiences of women who live, or had lived, with the condition. This outreach was credited with directly saving the life of at least one woman who went to the hospital after experiencing symptoms of a heart attack after hearing her message.

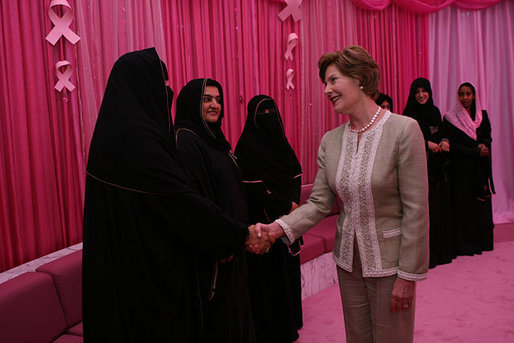
Laura Bush meets with members of the Pink Majlis, a forum focusing on issues related to breast cancer, in Abu Dhabi, United Arab Emirates, October 22, 2007.

With her predecessor, former first lady Nancy Reagan, Bush dedicated the First Ladies Red Dress Collection at the John F. Kennedy Center for the Performing Arts in May 2005. It is an exhibit containing red suits worn by former first ladies Lady Bird Johnson, Betty Ford, Rosalynn Carter, Nancy Reagan, Barbara Bush, Hillary Clinton, and Laura Bush meant to raise awareness by highlighting America's first ladies. She has participated in fashion shows displaying red dresses worn on celebrities as well.

Bush's mother, Jenna Welch, was diagnosed with breast cancer at the age of 78. She endured surgery and had no further signs of cancer. Laura Bush has become a breast cancer activist on her mother's behalf through her involvement in the Susan G. Komen for the Cure. She applauded the foundation's efforts in eliminating cancer and said, "A few short years ago, a diagnosis of breast cancer left little hope of recovery. But thanks to the work of the Komen Foundation ... more women and men are beating breast cancer and beating the odds." She used her position to gain international support for the foundation through the Partnership for Breast Cancer Awareness and Research of the Americas, an initiative that unites experts from the United States, Brazil, Costa Rica and Mexico.

In November 2001, she became the first person other than a president to deliver the weekly presidential radio address. She used the opportunity to discuss the plight of women in Afghanistan leading up to the U.S. invasion of Afghanistan, saying "The brutal oppression of women is a central goal of the terrorists." Her husband was originally to give the address but he felt that she should do it; she later recalled, "At that moment, it was not that I found my voice. Instead, it was as if my voice found me." Her words summarized one of the goals and moral rationales of the U.S. involvement in Afghanistan and it became one of the more famous speeches of his administration. In May 2002, she made a speech to the people of Afghanistan through Radio Liberty. In March 2005, she made the first of three trips to that country as First Lady.

=== Campaigning ===
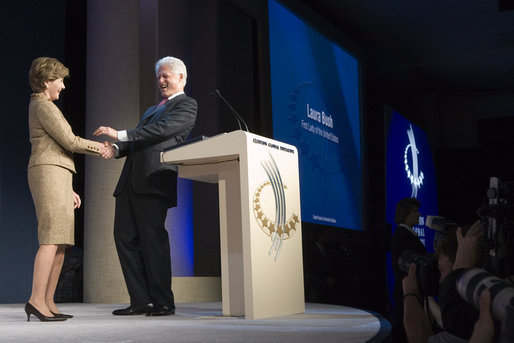
Bush appearing alongside Bill Clinton in New York, September 20, 2006

Bush campaigned for Republicans around the country in 2002 for that year's midterm elections, attending and hosting fundraisers as well as giving speeches. Opponents deemed this as the Bush administration "working against women's rights issues and using women to do their dirty work" and partly a test for Bush on how well she could campaign for her husband in the impending two years when he sought re-election.

During the 2004 election cycle, Bush made joint appearances with her husband on the campaign trail, including in battleground states such as Florida. She advocated for his re-election in a speech at the 2004 Republican National Convention, and was credited with having raised $15 million for her husband's campaign as well as the Republican Party while still succeeding in keeping a separate schedule that allowed for her to tend to the traditional duties she had as First Lady. In a July 2004 interview, Teresa Heinz, wife of Democratic presidential nominee John Kerry, said, "Well, you know, I don't know Laura Bush. But she seems to be calm, and she has a sparkle in her eye, which is good. But I don't know that she's ever had a real job—I mean, since she's been grown up." Heinz later apologized for the remark, stating that she had forgotten that Laura Bush was a teacher and librarian prior to her marriage. Bush stated that she forgave her while insisting her apology was unnecessary, citing her understanding of the "trick questions" asked by the media.

Bush was a participant in the 2006 midterm elections, beginning her campaigning in April. Though her poll numbers had decreased from an 80% approval rating, they still superseded that of President Bush, whose approval rating was only praised by a third of Americans. Ed Henry of CNN noted Bush's popularity, writing, "The first lady is treated like a rock star on the campaign trail – with local Republicans lining up for photographs and autographs – as she criss-crosses the country to help candidates." Bush relied on a strategy of praising the Republican candidate for their achievements and attending events alongside them. In September 2008, Bush spoke during the first night of the 2008 Republican National Convention, her joint appearance with Cindy McCain geared toward raising hurricane relief funds for victims of Hurricane Gustav.

=== Popularity and style ===
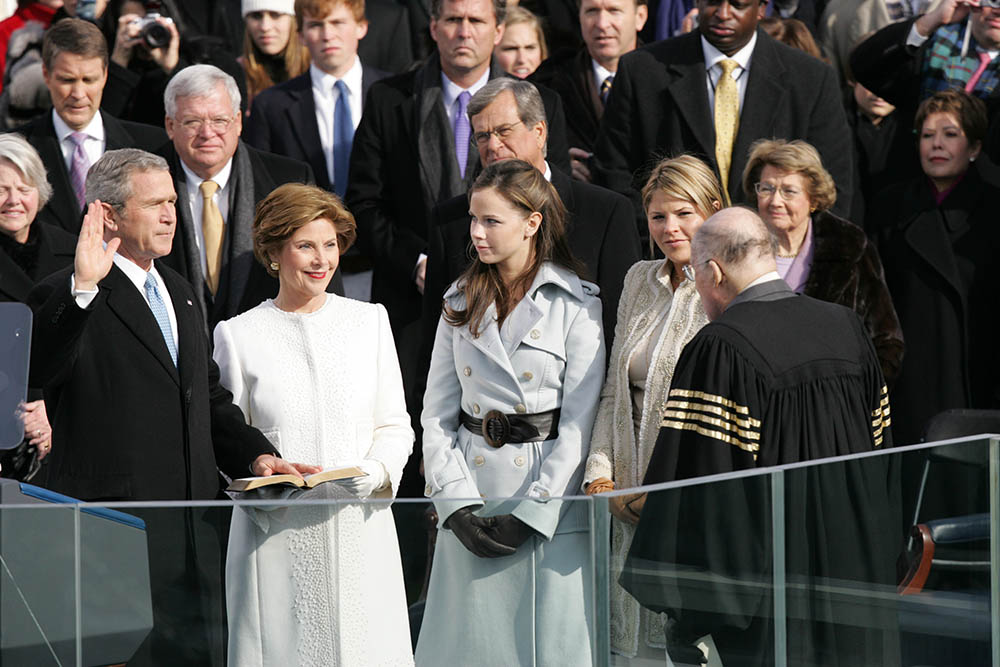
Laura's husband, President George W. Bush, is sworn into a second term on January 20, 2005, by Chief Justice William Rehnquist, as Laura Bush and daughters Barbara and Jenna look on.

Laura Bush's approval ratings have consistently ranked very high. In January 2006, a USA Today/CBS/Gallup poll recorded her approval rating at 82 percent and disapproval at 13 percent. That places Bush as one of the most popular first ladies. Former White House press secretary Ari Fleischer said, "She is more popular, and more welcome, in many parts of the country than the president ... In races where the moderates are in the most trouble, Laura Bush is the one who can do the most good."

Jude Ellison Sady Doyle reasoned that Bush was hard to dislike due to her adopting "the least partisan causes" such as literacy and breast cancer, which would attract the support of most Americans and her coming off as a "mild, polite, ordinary woman who might go to church with your mother, or organize suburban potlucks". Doyle furthered that her statements were never enough to offend others and the harshest criticism that could be bestowed upon her was that she was boring.

She disagreed with Fox News' Chris Wallace in 2006 when Wallace asked why the American people were beginning to lose confidence in President Bush, saying, "Well, I don't think they are. And I don't really believe those polls. I travel around the country, I see people, I see their response to my husband, I see their response to me. There are a lot of difficult challenges right now in the United States ... All of those decisions that the President has to make surrounding each one of these very difficult challenges are hard. They're hard decisions to make. And of course some people are unhappy about what some of those decisions are. But I think people know that he is doing what he thinks is right for the United States, that he's doing what he – especially in the war on terror, what he thinks he is obligated to do for the people in the United States, and that is to protect them ... When his polls were really high they weren't on the front page."

During the January 2005 second inauguration ceremonies for her husband, Laura Bush was looked highly upon by People magazine, The Washington Post, and others for her elegance and fashion sense. At the inauguration she wore a winter white cashmere dress and matching coat designed by Oscar de la Renta. Following the inauguration were the inaugural galas, to which Bush wore a pale, aqua lace gown, sprinkled with crystals, with long sleeves in a silver blue mist. The tulle gown was also designed for her by de la Renta. According to The Washington Post, "[I]t made her look radiant and glamorous."

=== Foreign trips ===
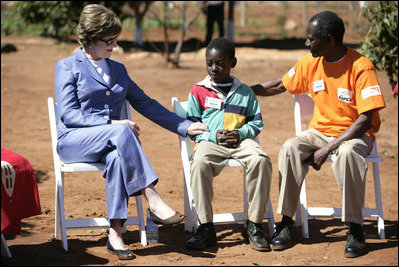
Laura Bush talks with Raphael Lungo of Zambia as a part of her 2007 African trip.

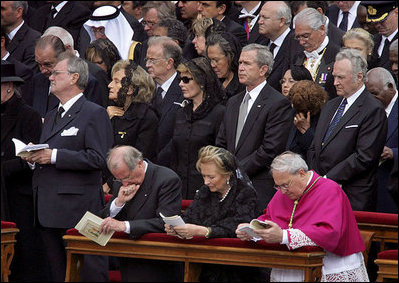
Laura Bush with her husband and several other dignitaries from around the world at the funeral of Pope John Paul II

During her husband's second term, Bush was more involved in foreign matters. She traveled to numerous countries as a representative of the United States.

As First Lady, she took five goodwill trips to Africa. The purpose of these has mostly been to raise awareness about HIV/AIDS and malaria as part of the Bush administration's initiative to address the global epidemics, but Bush has also stressed the need for education and greater opportunities for women. She has taken many other trips to other countries to promote and gain support for President Bush's Emergency Plan for AIDS relief; these countries include Zambia (2007), Mozambique (2007), Mali (2007), Senegal (2007), and Haiti (2008).

In mid-2007, she took a trip to Myanmar where she spoke out in support of the pro-democracy movement, and urged Burmese soldiers and militias to refrain from violence. Later that October, she ventured to the Middle East. Bush said she was in the region in an attempt to improve America's image by highlighting concern for women's health, specifically promoting her breast cancer awareness work with the US-Middle East Partnership for Breast Cancer Awareness and Research. She defined the trip as successful, saying that stereotypes were broken on both sides.

Overall, Bush traveled to 77 countries in the eight years of her husband's presidency, touring 67 of those during the second term.

=== Views on policy ===
Bush is a Republican and has identified herself with the GOP since her marriage.

When asked about abortion in 2000, Bush said she did not believe Roe v. Wade should be overturned. She did not comment on whether women had the right to an abortion. She did say, however, that the country should do "what we can to limit the number of abortions, to try to reduce the number of abortions in a lot of ways, and that is, by talking about responsibility with girls and boys, by teaching abstinence, having abstinence classes everywhere in schools and in churches and in Sunday school".

Bush responded to a question during a 2006 interview concerning the Federal Marriage Amendment by calling for elected leaders not to politicize same-sex marriage, "I don't think it should be used as a campaign tool, obviously. It requires a lot of sensitivity to just talk about the issue ... a lot of sensitivity."

On July 12, 2005, while in South Africa, Bush suggested her husband replace retiring Supreme Court justice Sandra Day O'Connor with another woman. On October 2, during a private dinner at the White House with his wife, President Bush nominated Harriet Miers to replace O'Connor. Later that month, after Miers had faced intense criticism, Laura Bush questioned whether the charges were sexist in nature.

=== Legacy ===
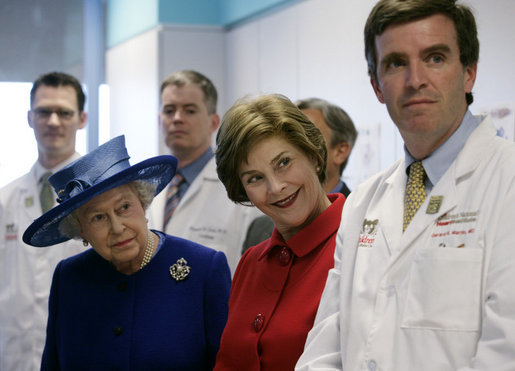
Queen Elizabeth II and Laura Bush at the Children's National Medical Center in 2007

In late October 2008, days before that year's presidential election, Bush hosted a three-hour session with staffers and historians discussing how she would like to be remembered, leading to this meeting being termed the "legacy lunch". According to historian Myra Gutin, this was the first time in history that a First Lady had ever directly reached out to historians to talk about her accomplishments. Attendants of the meeting said that Bush wanted to change the perception that she was a traditional first lady in that she always stayed by her husband's side. At a 2014 National Press Club, Anita McBride opined that it would be harder for people to understand where Bush had "the greatest impact" due to the several signature issues that Bush advocated for while First Lady.

In 2017, journalist Brooke Baldwin suggested Bush's efforts toward improving the lives of Afghan women may have contributed to more Afghanistan women being in positions within the Afghanistan private sector.

Bush enjoyed widespread approval by the American public both as the incumbent First Lady and during her retirement. The Washington Post contributor Krissah Thompson recalled Bush's favorability being "as close to universal popularity as any modern political figure" when the Bushes left the White House in 2009 and called her "the most high-profile promoter of the George W. Bush legacy — a burden she carries lightly and with a smile." A 2014 poll which asked who was the most popular First Lady in the past 25 years found Bush ranked in fourth place (out of 4 candidates), behind Hillary Clinton, mother-in-law Barbara and direct successor Michelle Obama.

== Subsequent activities (2009–present) ==
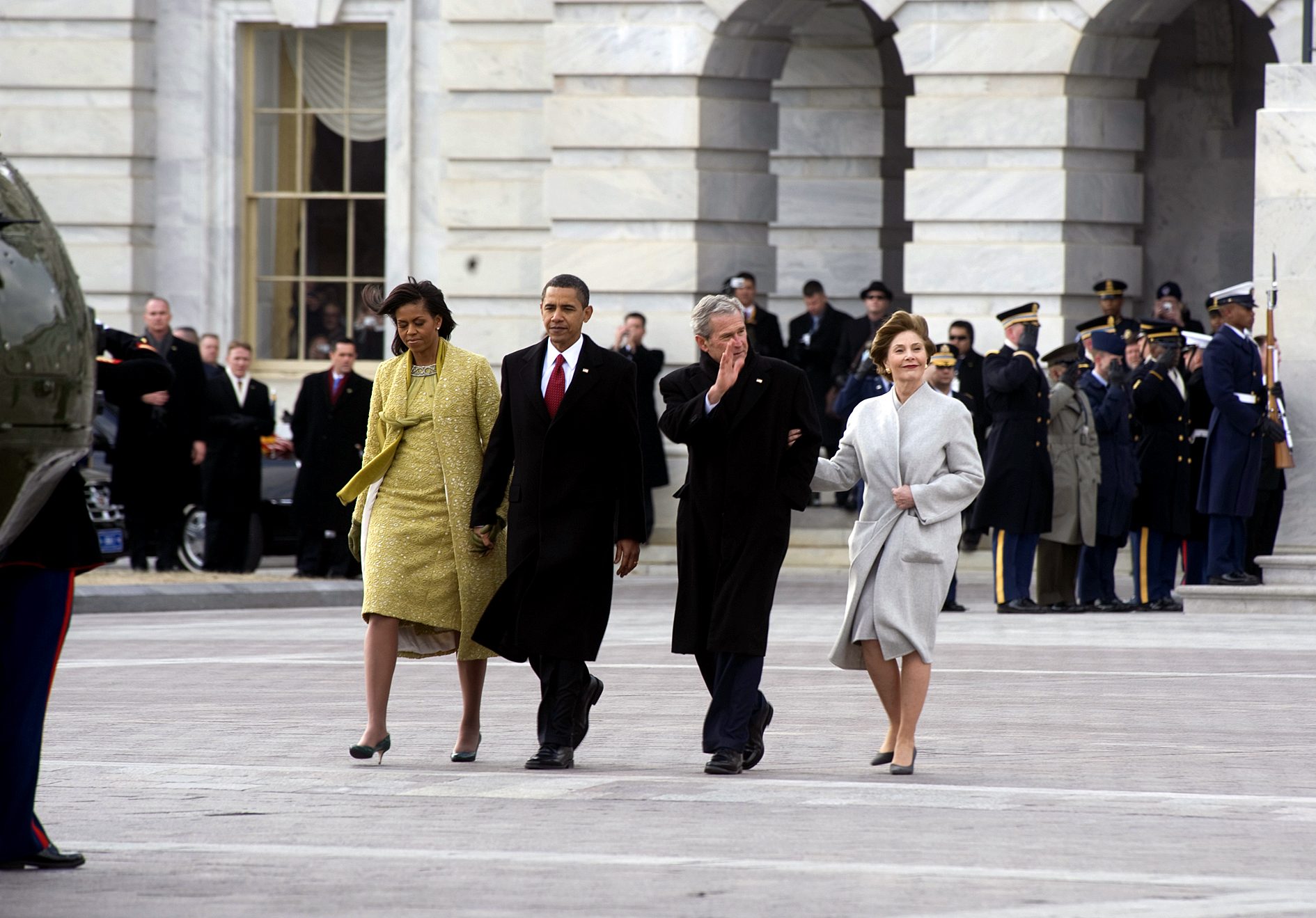
Former First Lady Laura Bush and her husband being escorted to a waiting helicopter by President Barack Obama and First Lady Michelle Obama on January 20, 2009

In February 2009, the month after she and her husband left office, Laura and George W. Bush moved into a new residence in Dallas. In November 2009, the former first lady, accompanied by her husband, made a visit to families of veterans in Fort Hood in the wake of the mass shooting there. The couple expressed their wishes that the trip not be publicized. However, Fox News revealed the trip the following morning.

In May 2010, Bush released her memoir, Spoken from the Heart, in conjunction with a national tour.

On May 11, 2010, during an interview on Larry King Live, Bush was asked about same-sex marriage. She said she viewed it as a generational issue and believed it would be made legal in the future. Bush offered support for the issue by saying "when couples are committed to each other and love each other ... they ought to have the same sort of rights that everyone has." Bush referred to her 2000 interview, reaffirming her support for Roe v. Wade, "I think it's important that [abortion] remain legal. Because I think it's important for people – that for medical reasons and, and other reasons." On February 22, 2013, without her consent, she was included in a pro-gay advertisement from the Respect of Marriage Coalition. A statement from Bush's spokesperson states that Bush "did not approve of her inclusion in this advertisement nor is she associated with the group that made the ad in any way. When she became aware of the advertisement last night, we requested that the group remove her from it."

Bush continued to remain involved and concerned over the state of women in Afghanistan, speaking out editorials and appearances during 2013 that the women and girls who had been helped could not be abandoned during and after the planned withdrawal of U.S. troops from Afghanistan. In March 2016, Bush wrote an op-ed for The Washington Post on changes occurring among women in Afghanistan while noting continued violence and calling for American involvement in Afghanistan to be consistent and predictable in continuing along with the international community "to provide significant development assistance in the areas of health care, entrepreneurship and education". In June 2016, Bush stated that she hoped the US remained in Afghanistan and had consulted with women there who feared the departure of American troops would create "a vacuum" similar to Iraq, furthering that the US "would have to start all over again" if they withdrew troops. In late 2017, Bush and First Lady of Afghanistan Rula Ghani traveled to Washington to rally lawmaker support for Afghanistan and women there.

In April 2015, Bush criticized Rand Paul's isolationist stance on U.S. foreign aid, calling the view "not really realistic" and asserting the United States should save lives whenever it can. That August, she shared the first public photos of her newborn granddaughter Poppy Louise.

=== Public appearances ===
On October 26, 2009, Bush spoke at the 25th Annual Women's Conference in Salt Lake City, Utah.

On May 31, 2012, Bush and her husband unveiled their official portraits painted by John Howard Sanden in a ceremony at the White House attended by several members of their family and former members of the Bush administration. Bush jokingly told then First Lady Michelle Obama at the ceremony that "nothing makes a house a home like having portraits of its former occupants staring down at you from the walls". Bush was portrayed in the White House's Green Room in her portrait, wearing a midnight blue gown.

On July 25, 2012, she spoke at the Luisa Hunnewell's estate, where she praised Edith Wharton's works, in particular Ethan Frome on her 150th anniversary. She also said that prior to this speech she also visited houses of Mark Twain at his 166th anniversary on November 29, 2001, and was a guest of the show Mark Twain Tonight. Ten years prior to the Luisa Hunnewell's estate visit she also visited Louisa May Alcott's Orchard House in Concord, Massachusetts at which she met with the National Trust for Historic Preservation's President and listened to Concord-Carlisle High School's chorus.

In April 2013, Bush was in attendance at a news conference, where she said the recently built George W. Bush Presidential Library and Museum was not a monument for her husband but instead a representation of the White House and the struggles of America during his tenure. She also mentioned not having trouble donating clothes to the library, admitting that she probably would have never worn them again in the first place. That month it was announced that she would serve as a keynote speaker for the 2013 Global Business Travel Association Convention in August. At the convention, she stressed the importance of child literacy, continuing her advocating of an issue that she had become associated with since her tenure as First Lady. In early August 2013, she reported that her husband was in stable condition after having a stent implanted in his heart, calling it "terrific" that it was caught in time, and stressed the importance of regular check ups with doctors. In September, she appeared at a fundraiser for the organization Solutions for Change.

On April 26, 2014, she gave a speech at the Ericsson Center in Plano, Texas, where she spoke on behalf of the company's mentoring program for girls. Throughout the month, she made appearances at fundraisers for schools in Colorado. On May 9, 2014, she was scheduled to speak at the Boston Convention and Exhibition Center on the anniversary of the Boston Marathon bombing. She was to arrive there with her daughter Barbara Pierce Bush, her husband George W. Bush, and Soledad O'Brien, a journalist.

In 2015, Bush had several speaking arrangements on issues relating to her husband's presidency. In July, the former first lady, accompanied by her husband, attended the centennial anniversary of Tioga Road In Yosemite National Park in July and appeared in New Orleans in order to commemorate the tenth anniversary of Hurricane Katrina. In October, she was a featured speaker for Wayland Baptist University.

Bush was keynote speaker at the Go Red for Women Summit in Austin in February 2016, an event designed to promote both financing and awareness for women fighting heart disease. In March, Bush attended the funeral of Nancy Reagan in California. and attended the memorial service for victims in the Dallas police officers shooting four months later in July.

On February 4, 2017, Bush appeared at the annual Union Regional Foundation's Heart of a Woman brunch, saying women do not worry about their own health due to often taking care of someone else and that their improving in health would benefit those around them. On March 8, Bush was keynote speaker at the Illinois Holocaust Museum and Education Center's annual Humanitarian Awards Dinner, Bush relating that she had learned about the Holocaust through her father. In April, Bush was the keynote speaker of the 25th annual Art of Hope Gala at the Dallas Museum of Art. On May 17, Bush made her second visit to the Andrew Johnson Hermitage and gave the keynote address at the 117th Spring Outing celebration. On May 31, Bush delivered a speech at the South-Central Monarch Symposium on the monarch butterfly decline in recent years. On June 3, Bush served as the keynote speaker at the National Willa Cather Center dedication in Red Cloud, Nebraska and officially opened the center with a ribbon cut. The following month, Bush accepted an invitation to join the eminent international Council of Patrons of the Asian University for Women in Chittagong, Bangladesh. The university, which is the product of east–west foundational partnerships (Bill and Melinda Gates Foundation, Open Society Foundation, IKEA Foundation etc.) and regional cooperation, serves extraordinarily talented women from 15 countries across Asia and the Middle East, including Afghanistan and Myanmar. In September, Bush delivered the keynote address at the Gateway to Opportunity luncheon at the Omni Dallas Hotel.

In April 2020, amid the ongoing COVID-19 pandemic, Bush and Michelle Obama made a joint appearance on the One World: Together At Home televised concert special by the Global Citizen Festival where they expressed appreciation for healthcare workers, first responders, pharmacists, veterinarians, sanitation workers as well as grocery store workers and those delivering food and supplies to homes.

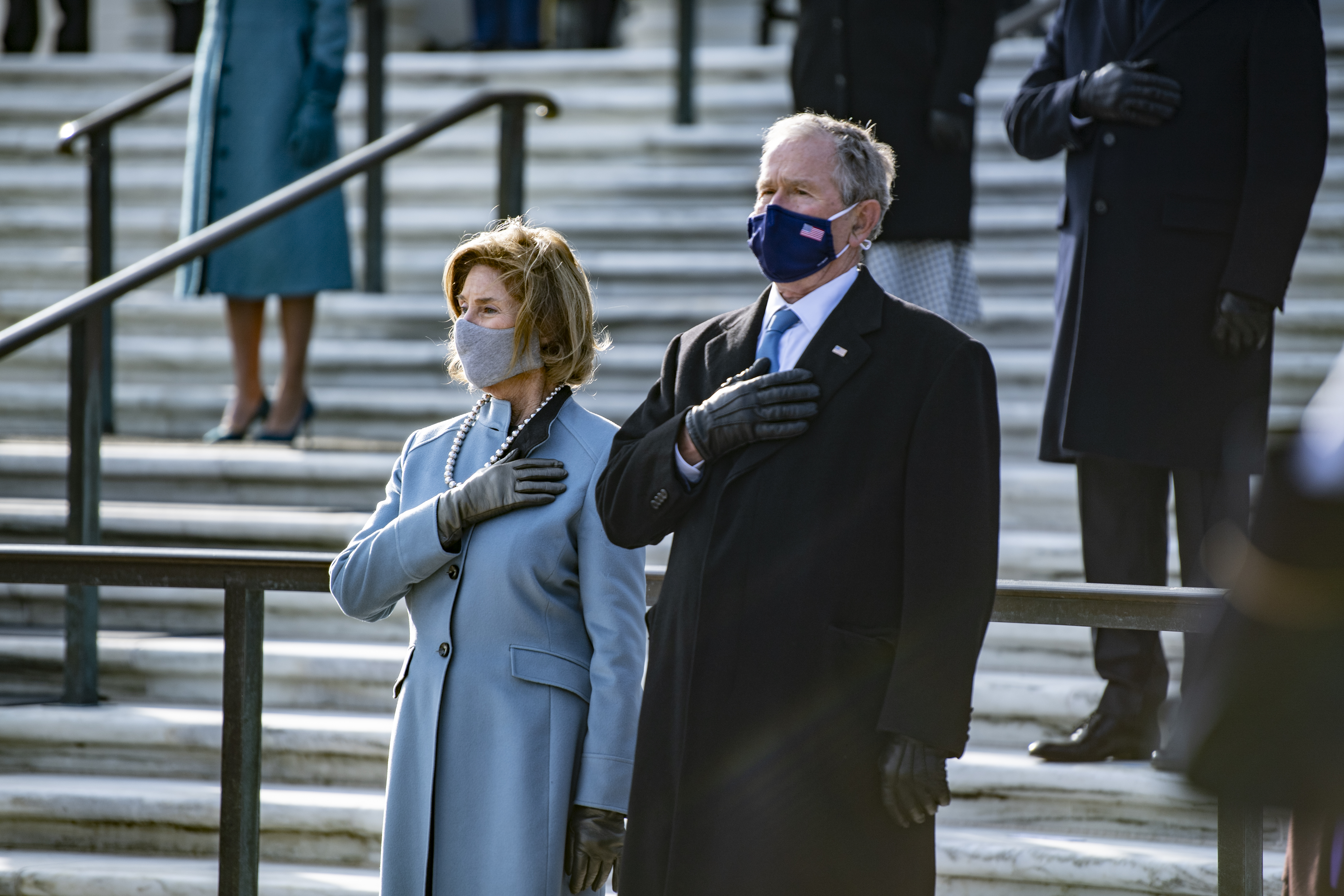
Bush and her husband attend a wreath laying ceremony at the Tomb of the Unknown Soldier in Arlington National Cemetery after the inauguration of Joe Biden.

On September 11, 2021, Bush and her husband commemorated the 20th anniversary of the September 11 attacks at the Flight 93 National Memorial.

Bush and her husband attended the dedication ceremony of the Barack Obama Presidential Center on June 18, 2026.

=== Obama administration ===
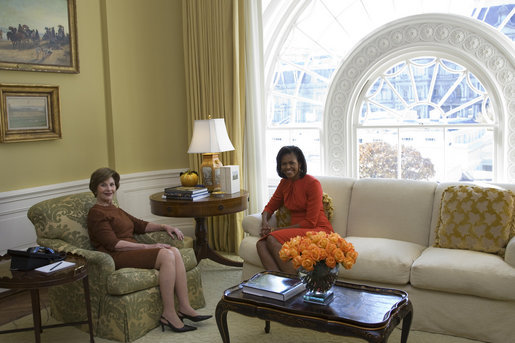
Laura Bush and Michelle Obama on November 10, 2008. The two First Ladies formed a friendship.

Over the course of the Obama presidency, she developed an alliance with Michelle Obama, her immediate successor as First Lady. Despite their political differences, Michelle Obama has called Laura Bush both her friend and a role model, crediting Bush with setting "a high bar" for her during her tenure as First Lady. Bush defended Obama during her husband's campaign for president in 2008, publicly coming to her defense when she received criticism for a remark she made about being proud of her country for the first time in her adulthood during the campaign. Obama sent Bush a note thanking her and after the election met with Bush at the White House in November 2008, Bush giving Obama a tour of her and her family's soon-to-be home.

In September 2009, Bush openly praised President Barack Obama and First Lady Michelle Obama. She reasoned that President Obama was performing well in the presidency despite having multiple initiatives taking place and complimented the First Lady's transformation of the White House into "a comfortable home for her family".

The following year, in September 2010, Bush and Obama commemorated the ninth anniversary of the September 11 attacks by leading a ceremony from a mountaintop to national memorial park. The two both acted as keynote speakers and met with the families of the 40 victims of United Airlines Flight 93 plane crash. In their remarks, the two sang each other's praises. Obama thanked Bush for her handling of the aftermath of September 11 attacks, while Bush called her a "first lady who serves this country with such grace".

In July 2013, Bush and Obama appeared together in Africa at the First Ladies Summit. Their husbands were also present, leading White House staffer Ben Rhodes to refer to the joint appearance as proof of the support for Africa in the United States regardless of political party. In their remarks, both Bush and Obama stressed the importance of being role models.

Nine months later, on April 18, 2014, Bush spoke to Inquisitr regarding income inequality where she said next regarding Michelle Obama's income: "I want to make sure that when she's working she's getting paid the same as men. I gotta say that First Ladies right now don't [get paid], even though that's a tough job!" In August 2014, Bush and Obama appeared together at the Kennedy Center. Shortly afterward, Bush told The Washington Post that she believed Obama was ready to leave the White House.

In March 2015, Bush and Obama were named as co-chairs of the Find Your Park campaign, an attempt to increase national park support and introduce millennials to the park service before its centennial the following year. The pair made a joint appearance at the George W. Bush Presidential Library and Museum in September 2015, Bush appearing physically while Obama was present through a video call. Obama spoke of her admiration for Bush, who in turn mentioned their collaborations as "a great example for the world to see that women in different political parties, in the United States, agree on so many issues".

=== First Trump administration ===
On January 20, 2017, Bush and her husband attended the inauguration of Donald Trump. In a November interview, Bush stated that she wished the Trumps "the very best" given that she knew what it was like to live in the White House and confirmed that she both been in contact with first lady Melania Trump and been invited to the Diplomatic Reception Room by retained personnel from the Bush administration.

On June 17, 2018, Bush wrote an opinion piece firmly opposing the Trump administration family separation policy in The Washington Post. She mentioned how her mother-in-law Barbara Bush had picked up a crying AIDS baby while on a visit to the HIV/AIDS shelter "Grandma's House" in 1989. She mentioned this to indicate her shock upon discovery that the workers at the children's border shelter have been instructed "not to pick up or touch the children to comfort them".

=== Biden administration ===
On January 20, 2021, Bush and her husband attended the inauguration of Joe Biden. Bush also attended the funerals for both former First Lady Rosalynn Carter and President Jimmy Carter during this administration.

=== Involvement with the Republican Party ===
In the later months of 2012, Bush campaigned for Republican presidential nominee Mitt Romney, hosting a fundraiser in September with Ann Romney and appearing in Livonia, Michigan, the following month for a Romney campaign event. Michigan spokeswoman for the Romney campaign Kelsey Knight said having Mrs. Bush there would "just fuel the fire and the momentum we are seeing". She also campaigned for vice presidential nominee Paul Ryan, telling a crowd in Detroit that he and Romney had "better answers" on the economy and foreign policy.

After the 2012 election, where Romney lost to President Obama, Bush was asked in March 2013 during an interview whether the GOP's positions on social issues such as same-sex marriage and abortion led to more than half of female voters voting for the President. Bush responded that some of the candidates had "frightened some candidates", but at the same time expressed her liking of the Republican Party having room for difference of opinion and that within the party, "we have room for all".

Throughout 2015, Bush was active in the presidential campaign of brother-in-law Jeb Bush, hosting fundraisers and endorsing him. This was the most politically involved she had been since leaving the White House seven years prior, supporting her brother-in-law alongside the rest of her family because, in her words, he was "our candidate". In March she affirmed her support for her brother-in-law, calling herself and her husband "huge Jeb supporters". It was reported that she would be assisting the campaign's fundraising in Florida in October, Bloomberg News commenting that Jeb Bush was "calling in help from perhaps the most popular member of his family". According to Clay Johnson, a friend of the Bush family, she was reportedly surprised by Donald Trump's becoming frontrunner over the course of the election cycle. In February 2016, amid her brother-in-law's campaign trailing Trump in South Carolina polls, Bush traveled there with her husband. Jeb Bush dropped out of the race after the South Carolina primary. The following month, Bush declined answering if she would vote for Trump, who was the frontrunner in the Republican primary, should he become the nominee and said the U.S. was going through a xenophobic period at the time of the election cycle. Ultimately, Bush and her husband refused to vote for a presidential candidate in 2016.

== Libraries ==
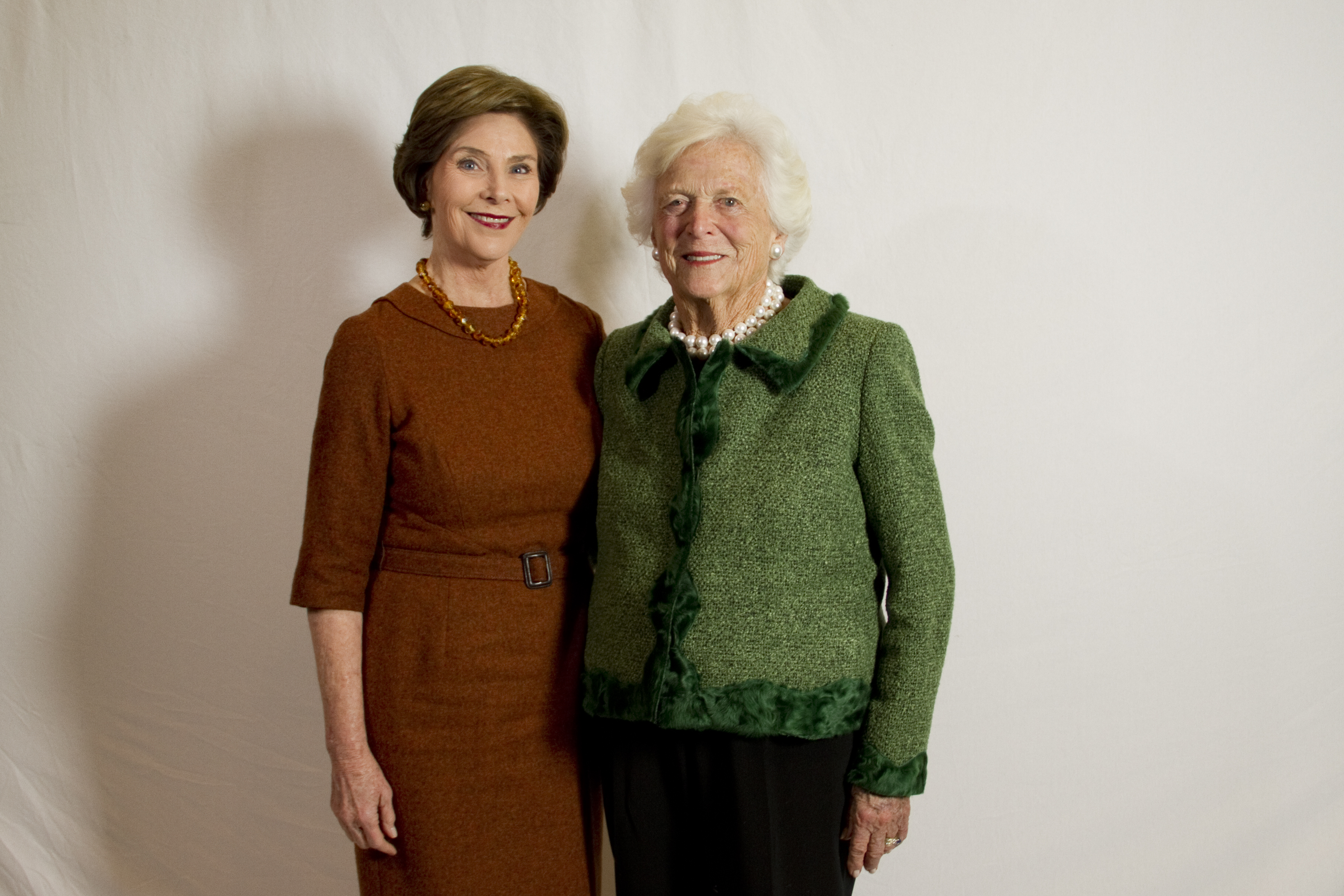
Laura Bush and mother in-law, former First Lady Barbara Bush, at the LBJ Presidential Library in 2012

Bush created the Laura Bush Foundation for America's Libraries "to support the education of our nation's children by providing funds to update, extend, and diversify the book and print collections of America's school libraries". Every year, the Laura Bush Foundation's grants award more than $1,000,000 to US schools.

The Laura Bush 21st Century Library Program grant, offered by the Institute of Museum and Library Services, provides funding for "the recruitment and education of library students and continuing education for those already in the profession, as well as the development of new programs and curricula". Bush's 21st Century Library Program is an equal opportunity grant that does not discriminate on the basis of race, color, national origin, sex, disability, or age.

In May 2015, Bush bestowed a $7,000 grant to six schools within Austin, Texas.

After Hurricane Katrina and Hurricane Rita in 2005, the Laura Bush Foundation for America's Libraries awarded grants of $10,000 to $75,000 to school libraries whose collections were damaged or destroyed in the hurricanes. In 2017, after the devastation from Hurricanes Harvey, Irma, and Maria as well as the California wildfires, the foundation again is going to dedicate their resources to disaster-affected schools to rebuild their book collections.

== Laura W. Bush Institute for Women's Health ==
In August 2007, the Laura W. Bush Institute for Women's Health (LWBIWH) was founded at the Texas Tech University Health Sciences Center. This institute aims to integrate research, education and community outreach in a multidisciplinary approach to women's health and has begun efforts to establish a multi-campus women's health institute in Amarillo, El Paso, Lubbock and the Permian Basin.

A subsidiary of the center, the Jenna Welch Women's Center, opened in Midland, Texas, on August 10, 2010, to deliver expert medical care to women and their families. Operating in partnership with the Laura Bush Institute, the Jenna Welch Center, named for Bush's mother, strives for excellence in research, education and community outreach.

== Writings and recordings ==
Bush wrote her first book with her daughter Jenna called Read All About It!. It was published on April 23, 2008. Bush's memoir, Spoken from the Heart, was published in 2010. The book received mixed reviews from critics but got positive responses from readers. The book earned Goodreads Choice Award Nominee for Memoir and Autobiography (2010). Her non-fictional book about oppressed women of Afghanistan titled We Are Afghan Women: Voices of Hope was published on March 8, 2016. She wrote another children's book with her daughter Jenna, Our Great Big Backyard. The book was published on May 10, 2016. She was the recipient of a lifetime achievement award from the Junior League of Dallas, of which she is a member.

== Awards and honors ==
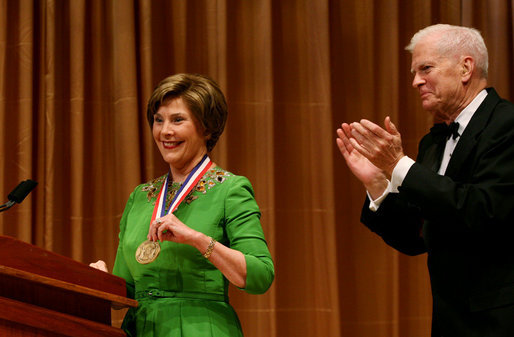
Bush is awarded the Living Legend Medallion from James H. Billington, the Librarian of Congress, for her work in support of the National Book Festival, September 2008.

During and after her tenure as the First Lady, Laura Bush received a number of awards and honors. In October 2002, the Elie Wiesel Foundation for Humanity honored her in recognition of her efforts on behalf of education. Also in 2002, she was named Barbara Walters' Most Fascinating Person of the year.

The American Library Association honored her for her years of support to America's libraries and librarians in April 2005.

On October 18, 2003, she was conferred by the former president Gloria Macapagal Arroyo the Order of Gabriela Silang, a single-class order which makes her the first U.S. First Lady recipient during the state visit of President George W. Bush to the Philippines.

She received an award in honor of her dedication to help improve the living conditions and education of children around the world, from the Kuwait-American Foundation in March 2006. She accepted The Nichols-Chancellor's Medal on behalf of disaster relief workers around the world in May 2006 from Vanderbilt University. In 2007, she received the Golden Plate Award of the American Academy of Achievement.

Four learning facilities have been named for her: the Laura Welch Bush Elementary School of Pasadena ISD in Houston, Texas, the Laura W. Bush Elementary School in the Leander ISD in Travis County, Texas, just outside Austin, the Laura Bush Middle School (Lubbock-Cooper ISD) in Lubbock, Texas, and the Laura Bush Education Center at Camp Bondsteel, a U.S. military base in Kosovo. She was awarded the 2008 Christian Freedom International Freedom Award. Bush is on the Board of Selectors of Jefferson Awards for Public Service.

In 2012, Bush—along with Hector Ruiz, Charles Matthews, Melinda Perrin, Julius Glickman and Admiral William H. McRaven, the Navy Seal who oversaw the raid that killed Osama bin Laden—was named a Distinguished Alumnus of the University of Texas at Austin.

In October 2015, Bush was conferred an honorary Doctor of Letters degree from Wayland Baptist University in recognition of her longtime advocacy on behalf of education, health care and human rights following an address she gave on the university's campus. November, she received the 2015 Prevent Blindness Person of Vision Award.

In November 2016, Bush received 10 for 10 award from Women's Democracy Network in recognition of her years of work on behalf of Afghan women's rights.

In May 2017, Bush received an honor at the Women Making History Awards in Washington, D.C.

In 2018, Laura Bush and former president George W. Bush were awarded the National Constitution Center Liberty Medal for their work with U.S. military veterans since leaving the White House.

In 2021, Bush received the Concordia Leadership Award.

== In popular culture ==
Laura Bush is portrayed by Elizabeth Banks in Oliver Stone's film W. Curtis Sittenfeld's bestselling novel American Wife is largely based on her life.

In 2018, Bush appeared in an episode of HGTV's Fixer Upper.

Bush is portrayed by Kathleen Garrett in the Showtime's 2022 series The First Lady.

Honorary titles
Vacant Title last held by Rita Clements	First Lady of Texas; 1995–2000	Succeeded by Anita Perry
Preceded by Hillary Clinton	First Lady of the United States; 2001–2009	Succeeded by Michelle Obama
