= Bloom Consulting =

- Type: Private
- Industry: Strategy consulting
- Founded: 2003
- Headquarters: Madrid, Spain
- Key people: José Filipe Torres, CEO. Keith Dinnie, president
- Website: www.bloom-consulting.com

Bloom Consulting is a consulting firm, specialised in nation branding. It was founded in 2003 by José Filipe Torres. Bloom Consulting is currently represented in Spain, Portugal, Saudi Arabia France, and United Kingdom. The company's work focuses mainly on nation branding, city branding and placemaking projects, including research for tourism, foreign direct investment and public diplomacy.

== Organization and administration ==
Bloom Consulting SL. is a Spain-based company. It works with a country office system, meaning that offices are established in countries under a new legal structure with Bloom Consulting SL. as a stakeholder, allowing individuals to join Bloom as a partner and opening a new country office after being trained by the Bloom Headquarters.

== Media coverage and presentations ==
Bloom Consulting has been covered in economic newspapers and magazines such as Forbes and The Economist.

== Bloom Consulting Country Brand Ranking ==
Bloom Consulting publishes the annual Bloom Consulting Country Brand Ranking, in two separate versions: Tourism and Trade. The ranking determines a country's position, according to its economic performance, based on previous economic history. The first ranking was made in summer 2011, examining 144 and 157 countries in the trade and tourism fields, respectively. The ranking uses dozens of variables to position the countries by facts and mathematical algorithms rather than pure opinions, like other country branding rankings do. The methodology measures the coherency between the external messages of a country and its actual economic performance. The higher a country is on the list, the better it is compared to their competitors, in positioning itself to attract foreign direct investment or tourists.
