= Keith Dinnie =

British academic and consultant

Dinnie delivering a keynote speech at the 3rd 21st Century Maritime Silk Road Forum in Zhuhai, China

Keith Dinnie is a British academic and consultant specializing in place branding, including nation branding and city branding. He is a Reader in Marketing at the University of Dundee and president of Bloom Consulting. Dinnie is the author of Nation Branding: Concepts, Issues, Practice, first published in 2008, with a third edition published by Routledge in 2022. He is also the editor of City Branding: Theory and Cases, published by Palgrave Macmillan in 2010. His research focuses on the use of strategic brand management by national governments in tourism marketing, export promotion, inward investment attraction, and public diplomacy. His books have been translated into Chinese, Japanese, Korean and Russian.

== Career ==
Dinnie obtained his MSc in Marketing from the University of Strathclyde after finishing his undergraduate studies at the University of Edinburgh. He later obtained a PhD in marketing from Glasgow Caledonian University. In June 2024, he completed the British Academy of Management Development Programme for Leaders of Engagement (BAM DPLoE).

Dinnie is a Reader in Marketing at the University of Dundee, where he has held roles in the School of Business as Head of Team for Management and Marketing and Associate Dean for Enterprise and Economic Transformation. He joined the University of Dundee School of Business in January 2018. Before taking on the Head of Team role, he was Programme Leader for the newly introduced MSc International Marketing degree programme and pathways. For three years, he was a faculty member at Temple University Japan in Tokyo. He taught master's and honours-level courses on marketing and branding at the University of Edinburgh. He has contributed to the Strathclyde MBA program. He is a visiting professor at Brussels Diplomatic Academy, Vrije Universiteit Brussel.

== Publications ==
Books

- Dinnie, Keith (2008). Nation Branding: Concepts, Issues, Practice. Elsevier Ltd. ISBN 978-0-7506-8349-4.
- Dinnie, Keith (2022). City Branding: Theory and Cases. Palgrave Macmillan. ISBN 9780367569891.

Articles

- Dinnie, Keith (2004). "Country-of-origin 1965-2004: A literature review". Journal of Customer Behaviour. 3 (2). Westburn Publishers Ltd: 165–213. doi:10.1362/1475392041829537.
- Dinnie, Keith; Seidenfuss, Kai-Uwe; Musa, Ghazali (2010). "Nation branding integrated marketing communications: An ASEAN perspective". International Marketing Review. 27 (4). Emerald Group Publishing Ltd.: 388–403. doi:10.1108/02651331011058572. hdl:11475/10069.
- Dinnie, Keith; Balmer, John M.T. (1999). "Corporate Identity and Corporate Communications: The Antidote to Merger Madness". Corporate Communications. 4 (4). Emerald Group Publishing Ltd.: 182–92. doi:10.1108/13563289910299300.
- Dinni, Keith; Ibeh, Kevin (2005). "E-Branding Strategies of Internet Companies: Some Preliminary Insights from the UK". Journal of Brand Management. 12 (5). Henry Stewart Publications: 355–73. doi:10.1057/palgrave.bm.2540231.
- Dinnie, Keith; Hart, Susan Jane; Centeno-Velazquez, Edgar (2013). "The Five Phases of SME Brand-Building". Journal of Brand Management. 20 (6). Palgrave Macmillan: 445–57. doi:10.1057/bm.2012.49.
- Dinnie, Keith; Rehmet, Jonas (2013). "Citizen Brand Ambassadors: Motivations and Perceived Effects". Journal of Destination Marketing & Management. 2 (1). Elsevier Ltd.: 31–38. doi:10.1016/j.jdmm.2013.02.001.
- Dinnie, Keith (2009). "Repositioning the Korea Brand to a Global Audience: Challenges, Pitfalls and Current Strategy". Korea Economic Institute Academic Paper Series. 4 (9): 1–7.
- Dinnie, Keith; Felzensztein, Christian (2005). "The Effects of Country of Origin on UK Consumers' Perceptions of Imported Wines". Journal of Food Products Marketing. 11 (4): 109–17. doi:10.1300/j038v11n04_08.
- Kim, You Kyung; Shim, Sung Wook; Dinnie, Keith (2013). "The Dimensions of Nation Brand Personality: A Study of Nine Countries". Corporate Reputation Review. 16 (1): 34–47. doi:10.1057/crr.2012.22.
- Mainil, Tomas; Van Loon, Francis; Dinnie, Keith; Botterill, David; Platenkamp, Vincent; Meulemans, Herman (2012). "Transnational health care: From a global terminology towards transnational health region development". Health Policy. 108 (1): 37–44. doi:10.1016/j.healthpol.2012.08.002. PMID 22939046.
- Seidenfuss, Kai-Uwe; Kathawala, Yunus; Dinnie, Keith (2013). "Regional and Country Ethnocentrism: Broadening ASEAN Origin Perspectives". Asia Pacific Journal of Marketing and Logistics. 25 (2): 298–320. doi:10.1108/13555851311314077.
- Dinnie, Keith (2001). "Implications of National Identity for Marketing Strategy". The Marketing Review. 2 (3): 285–300. doi:10.1362/1469347012569922.
- Balmer, John M. T.; Dinnie, Keith (1999). "Merger Madness: The Final Coup de Grâce". Journal of General Management. 24 (4): 53–70. doi:10.1177/030630709902400404.
- Dinnie, Keith; Lio, Ada (2010). "Enhancing China's Image in Japan: Developing the Nation Brand through Public Diplomacy". Place Branding and Public Diplomacy. 6 (3): 198–206. doi:10.1057/pb.2010.20.

== See also ==
- City marketing
- Country of origin
- Country-of-origin effect
- Place branding
