= Zalvia =

Rock band of Mexico

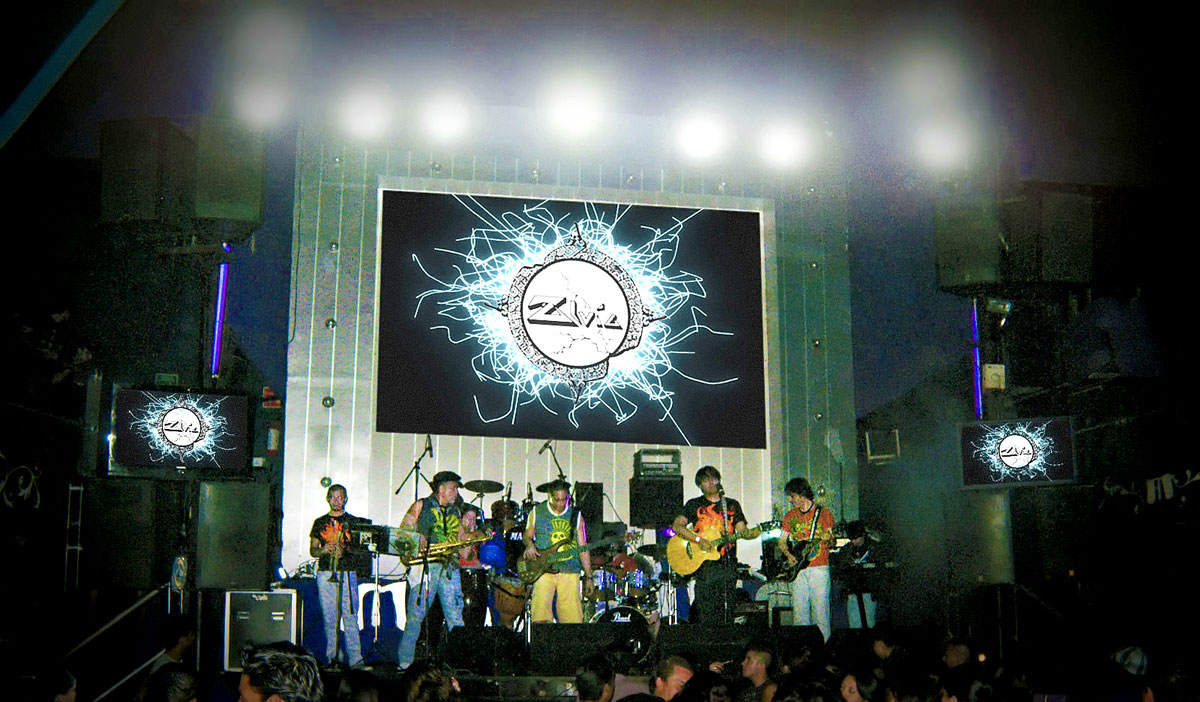
- Zalvia at the Maximus Quintin, Mexico

Background information
- Origin: Mexico City, Mexico
- Genres: Alternative rock Folk rock Indie rock
- Years active: 2008—present
- Label: Independiente
- Members: Antonio Torres; Yonatán Barrueta; Rober Serrano; Mariana Inés López; Fernando Torres; Lucho Garay; Victor Osorio; Luis Alvarado
- Past members: Miguel Rincón; Omar Mundo; Marco Antonio Villanueva
- Website: www.myspace.com/zalviaje

Zalvia is an alternative rock/folk rock band from Mexico City, Mexico, formed in 2008 by friends Antonio Torres (lead vocals, guitars), Yonatán Barrueta (guitars), Miguel Rincón (drums), Omar Mundo (bass) and Marco Antonio Villanueva (saxophone). The name is a variation of Salvia divinorum.

They are well known in their country for their contemporary rock sounds, based on the 1970s sounds from bands like The Doors, and also including sounds from their folk roots.

One year later, Zalvia's line-up changed, keeping Antonio Torres and Yonatán Barrueta as the only constant members and adding Roberto "Rober" Serrano (bass), Mariana Inés López (percussion), Fernando Torres (saxophone), Luis "Lucho" Garay (trumpet), Victor Osorio (keyboards), and Luis Alvarado (drums).

They have released two EPs, Zalvia (2008) and En vivo (2009). Their first album is to be released in 2010.

== History ==
United initially by their common love for The Doors, Zalvia have shown a growing interest in the composition of fusion folk roots, especially those working during the 1970s movement of alternative rock. Between these two related and creative filter verses revelation, valuable emotional debate about his music, a rock of the past but undeniable bond developed with rigour and freshness, plus exceptional flexibility that has allowed them to maintain a healthy pace of edits.

Since the middle of 2009, it has been one of the indie rock groups most active in Mexico. They played in front of a sold-out crowd at the Auditorio Nacional's Lunario, Hard Rock Cafe and many Latin Music Festivals.

== Discography ==
- Zalvia (2008)
  - X (Single)
  - Tierra Santa
- En vivo (2009)
  - Tirar a matar (Single)
  - Soledad
  - Aire
  - Demonio azul
  - Hombres de mundo
  - Fusión
  - Cielo gris
