= Joe Torres =

Joe Torres may refer to:

- Joe Campos Torres (1954–1977), Vietnam veteran beaten by Houston police and subsequently died
- Joe Torres (journalist) (born 1963), Hispanic-American news anchor and reporter
- Joe Torres (baseball) (born 1982), American baseball pitching coach
- J. Torres (fl. 1990s–2018), Canadian comic book writer
- Joe Torres, actor in the American comedy series Hey Dude

== See also ==
- Joe Torre (born 1940), American baseball executive, manager and former player
- Joseph de Torre (born 1932), Spanish-Filipino Catholic priest and philosopher
- José Torres (disambiguation), including José de Torres
