= The Ethics of Immigration =

Book by Joseph Carens

- First edition cover
- Author: Joseph Carens
- Publisher: Oxford University Press
- Publication date: September 2013
- ISBN: 978-0199933839

The Ethics of Immigration is a September 2013 book by the philosopher Joseph Carens.

== Structure of the book ==
The first eight chapters of the book argue for a robust system of migrant rights and equal treatment of immigrants and natives, while conceding the legitimacy of nation-states and their discretionary control over migration. The ninth and tenth chapter discuss illegal immigrants, family reunification, and refugees. The eleventh chapter argues for open borders, and challenges the presumption of discretionary control over migration, while still staying within the framework of legitimacy of nation-states.

Carens largely marginalises differences between citizens and legal residents, emphasising that lowering naturalisation requirements should be pursued, since they do not raise the necessary skills to do so. He further implicates that, insofar as their provisional nature, democratic justice does not grant that the rights between temporary migrant rights and citizens rights should be distinguished at a major rate, albeit he loosely asserts that temporary labourers should receive more rights than what residing illegals endure. Despite the contradictions, he acknowledges these discrepancies by claims that the state should adhere to allowing and defending irregular migrant rights, whilst simultaneously saying the state should simultaneously reduce illegal entry, labour and immigration; His reply to this is that the state should not ensure migrant rights entirely on a moral basis, although mainly on the moral obligation to preserve human rights at large, as per the functions of a democratic society.

== Reception ==
=== Interviews and self-promotion ===
Dylan Matthews interviewed Carens on his book for the Wonkblog section of the Washington Post. Carens was also interviewed about the book for New Books in Philosophy.

=== Book reviews ===
In April 2014, Notre Dame Philosophical Reviews published a review of the book by Arash Abizadeh. In late May 2014, the Crooked Timber blog hosted a symposium on the book, with contributions from Chris Bertram, Kenan Malik, Ryan Pevnick, Phillip Cole, Speranta Dumitru, Sarah Fine, Jo Shaw, Brian Weatherson, and others. Carens responded to the critiques in two blog posts.
