= Joseph Carens =

Canadian political scientist (born 1945)

- Born: 1945 (age 80–81); Shelby, Ohio, U.S.

Academic background
- Education: College of the Holy Cross (BA); Yale University (MPhil, MPhil, PhD)
- Thesis: Income Equality, Moral Incentives, and the Market (1977)
- Doctoral advisor: Charles E. Lindblom

Academic work
- Discipline: Political science
- Institutions: Princeton University; University of Toronto

Joseph Howard Carens FRSC (born 1945) is a Canadian-American political scientist known for his research on immigration and the ethics of immigration. He was a professor of politics and public affairs at Princeton University from 1981 to 1986 before becoming a professor of political science at the University of Toronto, where he is currently professor emeritus. He is an advocate of open borders.

== Early life and education ==
Carens was born in 1945 in Shelby, Ohio. His parents were descendants of Irish Catholic immigrants to Boston. He was raised a devout Catholic. He graduated from the College of the Holy Cross with a Bachelor of Arts, summa cum laude, in philosophy in 1966. He then earned an M.Phil. in religious studies in 1970, a second M.Phil. in political science in 1972, and his Ph.D. in 1977, all from Yale University. His doctoral dissertation, supervised by political economist Charles E. Lindblom, was titled, Income Equality, Moral Incentives, and the Market.

== Academic career ==
After receiving his doctorate, Carens was a visiting instructor in political science at North Carolina State University from 1973 to 1975, then joined Lake Forest College, where he was an assistant professor of politics from 1975 to 1981. During 1980–81, he also worked as a program analyst for the United States Office of Personnel Management. In 1981, Carens became an assistant professor of politics and public affairs at Princeton University, a position he held until 1986. While at Princeton, he spent the 1983–84 academic year as a member of the Institute for Advanced Study, where his research project was titled "The Morality of Bureaucracy".

Carens moved to Canada in 1985 to join the Department of Political Science at the University of Toronto, initially as a visiting assistant professor, and earned dual Canadian and U.S. citizenship. He became an assistant professor there in 1987, an associate professor in 1988, and a full professor in 1993.

Caren was a visiting research fellow at the Center for Ethics, Rationality, and Society at the University of Chicago in 1991, a Hoover Fellow at the Chaire Hoover d'éthique économique et sociale of the Université catholique de Louvain in 1993, a visiting professor at the Institute for Advanced Studies, Vienna, in 1995, and Forum Professor at the European Forum on Citizenship at the European University Institute in Florence in 1996. His research received support from the Rockefeller Foundation, the Social Sciences and Humanities Research Council of Canada, the University of Toronto's Connaught Fellowship program, and the Bora Laskin National Fellowship in Human Rights Research. In 2000, he published Culture, Citizenship, and Community: A Contextual Exploration of Justice as Evenhandedness. The book received the Canadian Political Science Association's C. B. Macpherson Prize for the best book in political theory.

Carens wrote on migration and citizenship in The Ethics of Immigration, published by Oxford University Press in 2013. The book received five book awards, including the 2014 David Easton Award from the Foundations of Political Theory section of the American Political Science Association (APSA), the 2014 C. B. Macpherson Prize from the Canadian Political Science Association, and awards from two sections of the International Studies Association. The International Studies Association's Ethnicity, Nationalism, and Migration section and its International Ethics section both named The Ethics of Immigration their distinguished or best book for 2015.

Carens was elected a Fellow of the Royal Society of Canada in 2015. By 2017, he had published more than 90 journal articles and book chapters in addition to his books. He was elected to the APSA Council for a three-year term from 2017 to 2020 and served on the association's Publications Committee during that period. Carens retired from his regular faculty position at Toronto in July 2020 and became a professor emeritus of political science. In 2025, APSA's Migration and Citizenship section named Carens and political scientist Doris Marie Provine co-recipients of its Career Achievement Award for their contributions to scholarship on migration and citizenship.

== Selected publications ==
=== Books ===
- Carens, Joseph H. (1981). Equality, Moral Incentives, and the Market: An Essay in Utopian Politico-Economic Theory. Chicago, IL: University of Chicago Press. ISBN 978-0226092690.
- Carens, Joseph H., ed. (1993). Democracy and Possessive Individualism: The Intellectual Legacy of C. B. Macpherson. SUNY Series in Political Theory. Albany, NY: State University of New York Press. ISBN 978-0791414576.
- Carens, Joseph H., ed. (1995). Is Quebec Nationalism Just? Perspectives from Anglophone Canada. Montreal and Kingston: McGill–Queen's University Press. ISBN 978-0773513426.
- Carens, Joseph H. (2000). Culture, Citizenship, and Community: A Contextual Exploration of Justice as Evenhandedness. Oxford: Oxford University Press. doi:10.1093/0198297688.001.0001. ISBN 978-0198297512.
- Carens, Joseph H. (2010). Immigrants and the Right to Stay. Boston Review Books. Cambridge, MA: MIT Press. ISBN 978-0262014830.
- Carens, Joseph H. (2013). The Ethics of Immigration. Oxford Political Theory. New York, NY: Oxford University Press. ISBN 978-0199933839.

=== Articles ===
- Carens, Joseph H. (1987). "Aliens and Citizens: The Case for Open Borders". The Review of Politics. 49 (2): 251–273. doi:10.1017/S0034670500033817. JSTOR 1407506.
- Carens, Joseph H. (1992). "Refugees and the Limits of Obligation". Public Affairs Quarterly. 6 (1): 31–44. JSTOR 40435795.
- Carens, Joseph H. (1996). "Realistic and Idealistic Approaches to the Ethics of Migration". International Migration Review. 30 (1): 156–170. doi:10.1177/019791839603000113. JSTOR 2547465.
- Carens, Joseph H. (2003). "Who Should Get In? The Ethics of Immigration Admissions". Ethics & International Affairs. 17 (1): 95–110. doi:10.1111/j.1747-7093.2003.tb00421.x.
- Carens, Joseph H. (2004). "A Contextual Approach to Political Theory". Ethical Theory and Moral Practice. 7 (2): 117–132. doi:10.1023/B:ETTA.0000032761.25298.23.
- Carens, Joseph H. (2005). "The Integration of Immigrants". Journal of Moral Philosophy. 2 (1): 29–46. doi:10.1177/1740468105052582.
- Carens, Joseph H. (2008). "The Rights of Irregular Migrants". Ethics & International Affairs. 22 (2): 163–186. doi:10.1111/j.1747-7093.2008.00141.x.
- Carens, Joseph H. (2008). "Live-in Domestics, Seasonal Workers, and Others Hard to Locate on the Map of Democracy". Journal of Political Philosophy. 16 (4): 419–445. doi:10.1111/j.1467-9760.2008.00314.x.
- Carens, Joseph H. (2014). "An Overview of the Ethics of Immigration". Critical Review of International Social and Political Philosophy. 17 (5): 538–559. doi:10.1080/13698230.2014.919057.
