= Yoeni de Jesús Guerra García =

Cuban journalist and human-rights activist

- Occupations: Journalist, human rights activist
- Organization(s): Council of Cuban Human Rights Rapporteurs, & the Círculos Democráticos Municipalistas

Yoeni de Jesús Guerra García is an independent Cuban journalist and human-rights activist who was arrested in October 2013 and sentenced to seven years in prison on March 13, 2014. He also belongs to the Council of Cuban Human Rights Rapporteurs and the Círculos Democráticos Municipalistas. He lives in Arroyo Blanco, Jatibonico, Sancti Spíritus.

As of March 2014, he was 36 years old.

== Career ==
Based in the city of Sancti Spíritus, Guerra Garcia is a correspondent for Boletín Voz Avileña and for the Yayabo Press news agency. He is also a leading democracy and human-rights activist.

== Imprisonment and torture ==
Guerra García was arrested at his home in October 2013 “in a violent and arbitrary way.” After his arrest, a report stated that he faced up to 20 years in prison for theft and slaughter of livestock.

During his imprisonment in the Nieves Morejón prison in Sancti Spíritus, Guerra García has undergone various forms of torture, including beatings and a gang rape that were ordered by prison officials. His food has also been laced with drugs.

He was beaten brutally several times by prison officials, according to several surreptitious phone calls made from the prison by inmates sympathetic to his situation. In November 2013, it was reported that he had been raped in prison on the night of November 15 by two prisoners acting on official orders and that he had been drugged and physically and mentally abused. His sister, Yalena Guerra García, said that her brother had written a document several pages long describing his rape and had hidden it in some dirty socks that were given to her and their mother. When the documents were presented to the political police, the latter confiscated the document. In the document, Guerra García identified his rapists as two gay fellow prisoners named “Bombino” and “Juaquinito.”

On the night of November 16, guards in the Sancti Spíritus reportedly forced Guerra Garcia to stand with his arms tied above his head to the bars of his cell. He was then severely beaten by political police agents and guards, causing injuries to his head, back, and arms that necessitated his transfer to the prison infirmary.

Guerra García was later held incommunicado in a psychiatric hospital where he was tied to a bed and reportedly attempted suicide. Guerra García's mother, Martha Garcia, said she had been told by a medical official and by the hospital psychiatrist that her son was being kept sedated and strapped to a hospital bed because he had repeatedly tried to kill himself.

A reporter who visited Guerra García on March 18, 2014, described him as “visibly shaken.” Guerra García told the reporter that the charges against him were fabricated by Cuban State Security because he had written articles that were critical of the government and supportive of human rights. He called the authorities Nazis and said they had driven him crazy. “I hardly remember anything that has happened to me,” he said.

== Response by media and activists ==
In a November 2013 statement, the Council of Human Rights Rapporteurs of Cuba denounced Guerra García's arrest and abuse, which the council described as “one of the saddest, barbaric and heinous crimes known to humanity.”

Commenting in November 2013 on Guerra Garcia's arrest, Jay Nordlinger of National Review wrote: “The Cuban dictatorship has just been elected to the Human Rights Council of the United Nations. As Solzhenitsyn observed, the U.N. should not be thought of as a union or collection of nations or peoples; it is a union or collection of governments or regimes — and many of them are undemocratic, vicious, monstrous.”

In a May 7, 2015, letter to French President Francois Hollande, who was about to visit Cuba, Reporters Without Borders called on him to “seek the immediate and unconditional release” of Guerra Garcia as well as of two other Cuban inmates, José Antonio Torres (Cuban journalist) and Angell Santiesteban-Prats.
