= José Filipe Torres =

Portuguese entrepreneur, spokesperson (born 1976)

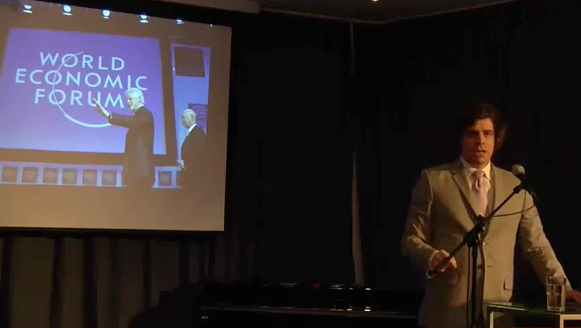
- Jose Filipe Torres at the Berlin International Economics Congress in 2011
- Born: 13 April 1976 (age 50)
- Occupation: CEO of Bloom Consulting

José Filipe Torres (born 13 April 1976) is a Portuguese entrepreneur, spokesperson, and consultant on country branding and nation branding.

== Biography ==
Torres studied in Parson, New York City and Central St Martins, London. He is the CEO and founder of Bloom Consulting, a company he set up in 2003. He was quoted by Forbes about nation branding, cautioning that, "Good brand positioning doesn't always mean more tourism, economic development and foreign investment".

In 2011, Torres initiated a new research project which investigated 144 countries' trade performance and 157 countries' tourism performance, with analysis on dozens of variables. The report was given the name Bloom Consulting Country Brand Ranking and has been published all around the world, including by CNN.
