= National Anthem Project =

American public awareness campaign

The National Anthem Project was a public awareness campaign launched in 2005 as a major initiative of MENC: The National Association for Music Education. At the time of its launch, the National Anthem Project website declared "MENC is sponsoring The National Anthem Project to revive America's patriotism by educating Americans about the importance of The Star-Spangled Banner - both the flag and the song." Sponsored by MENC with major support from the Jeep brand, and other sponsors such as NAMM, Bank of America, and the Gibson Foundation, this campaign, which later used the slogan "to restore America's voice through music education" was MENC's most ambitious project to date. A former First Lady, Laura Bush served as honorary chairperson, with country music's The Oak Ridge Boys as the official musical ambassadors. The stated purpose of the project was originally "to revive America's patriotism," but this was later modified to suggest that its purpose was merely to encourage more singing of the national anthem, or to bring more public attention to the role of music in American schools.

== Support ==
A bipartisan discourse of American government officials, including more than twenty governors, Members of Congress, the National Endowment for the Arts, the Department of Education, the Smithsonian Institution's National Museum of American History, the Department of Defense, and National Endowment for the Humanities, indicated their support for the project and its goals. Project supporters also included civic organizations such as the Grammy Foundation, the National Education Association, the U.S. Conferences of Mayors, the Girl Scouts of the USA, the American Sportscasters Association, American Association of School Administrators, the National PTA, Music Teachers National Association, National Association for the Education of Young Children, and Drum Corps International.

== Project background ==
According to a 2004 Harris Interactive survey, nearly two out of three Americans (61 percent) are unable to recall all of the words to The Star-Spangled Banner and three in four Americans indicate that school is where they learned the anthem and other patriotic songs. However, a survey showed that only 39 percent of Americans could complete the third line of The Star Spangled Banner correctly with "...through the perilous fight." (In a version written by Francis Scott Key in 1840, the third line ends "...through the clouds of the fight.")

According to the National Anthem Project website, throughout the United States music programs have experienced extensive funding cuts over the past several years, and on average four percent of the $450 billion spent on teaching American children goes to music, which means 55 percent of students receive inadequate music education. Further, while local school boards struggle to close ongoing budget gaps and meet new federal requirements, music continues to be cut in districts across the country. "When these programs are cut out of public schools, we're not simply depriving our children of music, but hindering the teaching of our nation's history and heritage," says MENC Executive Director John Mahlmann, "Learning patriotic songs helps our children form bonds with their communities and instills pride in the American ideals we all hold close to our hearts – freedom, liberty and equality."

== Project events ==
The National Anthem Project toured the United States in 2006, making "Road Show" stops in every state and Washington, D.C. The Road Shows featured music performances by student ensembles, an interactive education center, and music education advocacy materials. Visitors were encouraged to try singing "The Star-Spangled Banner" to test themselves on its lyrics. At each stop, one singer was designated a winner and given $1000 to donate to the local school music program of his or her choice.

Having concluded its Road Show, the National Anthem Project focused on the planned Grand Finale in Washington, DC, June 14–16, 2007, which featured a performance of The Star Spangled Banner on the National Mall. On June 14, 2007 more than 1,200 participants gathered at FedEx Field, home of the Washington Redskins near Washington, D.C., to celebrate the Project in a singalong led by country star Taylor Swift.

That same day more than 5,000 students joined together on the National Mall at the Washington Monument with "The President's Own" U.S. Marine Band for an afternoon concert. On June 15, school ensembles from around the country performed throughout Washington, D.C. at eight monuments including the Lincoln Memorial, Capitol Reflecting Pool, World War II Memorial, and Jefferson Memorial.

The Grand Finale's third day of celebrations was hosted by Drum Corps International at the Navy/Marine Corps Stadium in Annapolis, Maryland. These festivities included a special singing of the national anthem, and later competition of drum corps from around the country. The National Anthem Project Grand Finale events garnered more than 220 news stories, reaching 26 million people.

The Project continued its tradition of celebrating National Anthem Project Day on each September 14. The day aims to promote the importance of music education and the Project by encouraging teachers, students, parents, and community members and leaders to participate in joint celebrations. Events include singalongs and public statements of support for music education by local school administrators and elected officials. Media coverage of National Anthem Project Day and public statements of support from state and national elected officials are available online on the Project Web site.

== Criticism of the project ==
Public criticisms include Amy Beegle's (2004) documentation of musical propaganda in American schools during World War II, and suggestion that music educators should "reflect upon the experiences of past generations" (p. 67). Later, Jere Humphreys remarked that "the National Anthem Project sends questionable messages during this time of controversy during a foreign war and the reduction of civil liberties at home and abroad" and warned against the "messages and images this campaign engenders" (Humphreys, 2006, p. 183). More recently, Carlos Abril (2007) cautioned that most of the Project's efforts "propel absolutist views in which declared truths take a front seat to divergent understandings and discoveries" (p. 81). Estelle Jorgensen (2007) also wrote that "selecting The Star-Spangled Banner as the focus of a national campaign to teach the nation to sing can be read as too narrow an objective in that it forwards the limited claims of nationalism to the exclusion of building international and local affiliations and identities. Rather, music teachers need to resist the claims of excessive nationalism in order to ensure that these other interests are also served" (p. 153).

== See also ==
- Branding national myths and symbols
