= We Are Afghan Women =

2016 book

We Are Afghan Women: Voices of Hope
- First edition
- Authors: Laura Bush
- Language: English
- Publisher: Scribner
- Publication date: March 8, 2016
- Pages: 352
- ISBN: 978-1-5011-2050-3

We Are Afghan Women: Voices of Hope is a 2016 non-fiction book about women's rights in Afghanistan. It was published by the George W. Bush Institute at the George W. Bush Presidential Center, with an introduction by former First Lady Laura Bush.

== Back Content ==
The introduction of the book was written by Former First Lady Laura Bush. The book is a collection of life stories of Afghan women. The book is about those determined women of Afghan who are defying the odds to lead Afghanistan to a better future.
