= First Ladies Summit =

The First Ladies Summit was officially established in 2010, with Malaysia playing the inaugural host for the event which was scheduled to take place biennially. It aimed to gather first ladies around the world to support a global initiative to ensure a safe and sustainable future for the next generation. The theme of the summit was "A Child Today, A Leader Tomorrow". Despite relatively lukewarm response, UN Secretary-General Ban Ki-moon praised the inaugural First Ladies Summit for its efforts in securing the welfare of children.

== Meetings ==
The meeting was held in Kuala Lumpur, Malaysia, from 11 to 13 October 2010.

The original plan was to hold the summit every two years, but it was subsequently cancelled following widespread criticism of its poor turnout. There is speculation that the event was merely an expensive publicity stunt thrown by Rosmah Mansor to justify her self-styled "First Lady of Malaysia" title — technically such a title cannot exist as Malaysia is a constitutional monarchy, not a republic. As of July 2012, there has been no further talk of hosting another summit.

== Participation ==
15 first ladies, six representatives of First Ladies and 21 ministers turned up for the event. The first ladies who attended the summit are listed as follows:

1. Teuta Topi (Republic of Albania)
2. Salomea Neves Aim Gomes (Guinea Bissau)
3. Ernestina Naadu Mills (Ghana)
4. Meme Tong (Kiribati)
5. Lorna Golding (Jamaica)
6. Keosaychay Sayasone (Laos)
7. Sarojini Jugnauth (Mauritius)
8. Maria De Luz Guebuza (Mozambique)
9. Patience Jonathan (Nigeria)
10. Mercedes Lugo De Maidana (Paraguay)
11. Natalie Brigitte Nadage Michel (Seychelles)
12. Sia Nyama Koroma (Sierra Leone)
13. Shiranthi Rajapaksa (Sri Lanka)
14. Thandiwe Banda (Zambia)

== Controversies ==
The summit sparked public outcry for its poor attendance. Zuraida Kamaruddin, Member of Parliament for Ampang, criticized the perceived wastage of public funds amounting to 24 million ringgit which she claimed could be put to better use. In addition, Rosmah Mansor's self-appointed title as First Lady of Malaysia drew ire from certain public quarters, as such a status is not official in Malaysia.
