= Branding national myths and symbols =

Field of research

Branding national myths and symbols (BNMS) is a field of research focusing on branding and marketing of a nation's myths and symbols. The research blends the theories of marketing, cultural communications, sociology, public relations, and semiotics. The awareness of a nation's (or a collective group's) internal myths and symbols may result in raising cultural relations between nations, according to this theory. The use dates from before 1990, and field of study dates from about 2000, but was not given this moniker by a scholar until 2009.

The principles of BNMS are related to, but are different from nation branding. The main difference between two principles is that nation branding is primarily concerned with raising the global image of a nation for better economic return, while BNMS is concerned with the revealing and demonstrating the meanings behind a nation's internal myths and symbols. In other words, nation branding is the selling or promotion of the external identity of a nation, while BNMS is the revealing of their internal identity, either for its own citizens to believe in, or to achieve better global relations between nations. According to the theory, each national myth and symbol has its own hidden meanings that may reinforce these misunderstandings between nations.

Examples of BNMS include changing the symbols on currency, a national anthem (see, e.g., National Anthem Project by the United States), and advertising in political campaigns.

== Core concepts ==
A national myth is an inspiring narrative or anecdote about a nation's past. Such myths often serve as an important national symbol and affirm a set of national values. A national myth may sometimes take the form of a national epic, part of the nation's civil religion, a legend or fictionalized narrative, which has been elevated to serious mythological, symbolical and esteemed level so as to be true to the nation. It might simply over-dramatize true incidents, omit important historical details, or add details for which there is no evidence; or it might simply be a fictional story that no one takes to be true literally, but contains a symbolic meaning for the nation.

The national folklore of many nations includes a founding myth, which may involve a struggle against colonialism or a war of independence. National myths serve many social and political purposes, such as state-sponsored propaganda, or inspiring civic virtue and self-sacrifice.

In some cases, the meaning of the national myth may become disputed among different parts of the population, such as majority and minority groups, which makes branding and advertising of the national myth necessary.

The World Intellectual Property Organization (WIPO) has conducted a number of symposia on the protection of folklore, i.e., "traditional cultural expressions", with the goal of preventing their "misappropriation" by branding, patenting, trademarking, or copyright by other persons.

== Recent examples ==
A recent, clear example as of 2011 is the use of "Greco-Roman symbols merged into Christianity" on the Euro note. Many nations have put their national ideas on their money "via branding national myths and symbols." The image of the crowning Charlemagne is on a Euro note, because he is "accepted as the Father of Europe and thereby of the EU, with buildings and rooms named after him." The accepted "symbol for EU culture ... symbolises a Doric column ..." but does not necessarily represent Europe's other cultures (Norse, etc.). Ultimately, Europe is based on the myth of the demi-god Europa and many of its symbols are based on ancient Greek art forms. If Turkey joined the EU, the current images could be a source of conflict:

According to Homer, Europa was born in Asia Minor in the east, so Anatolia or modern-day Turkey. After Europa was abducted by Zeus in his form as a white bull, she spent her adult life with him and their three boys in Crete, Greece. Posthumously, Europa is considered as the geographical mother of a land mass. To complete this circle, Europa needs to acknowledge her filial and ancestor duties towards her Asia Minor children. Symbols like these will exasperate and perpetuate the existing mutual misunderstandings between Turkey and the EU. No matter how much each of them would like to understand the other, ultimately, without an adjustment of these symbols, their attempts will be lukewarm and ineffective.

— Hatice Sitki

Another example from 2011 is that of Japan's self-branding of its scientific expertise, which fell apart after the earthquake and tsunami that March, followed by the nuclear accidents. In The New York Times, Mitsuyoshi Numano wrote, "It even begins to appear that Japan's vaunted scientific and technical prowess has taken on the character of a kind of myth, and that myth has deluded the nation's politicians and business leaders."

== Research in the field ==
Jonathan Rose first wrote about this concept in 2000, in which he claimed that Canada has had "an unholy alliance between advertising agencies and political parties" since the formation of the Confederation in 1867.

In a 2003 article, Rose wrote that national myths and symbols reinforce and create a "community and binding [its citizens]. These myths are not judged on their veracity but rather [on] their metaphorical and symbolic meaning." Rose maintained that the messages within these "created" myths are disseminated and ultimately maintained through its "civil society from its institutions, public policies and government". His prototypical study was on the Canadian government's creation of national myths in the 1980s and 1990s. Rose pointed out what was unique (in the 1980s) several major points:

1. "government advertising is used to create and develop national symbols and myths."
2. that government used "advertising [that] centres around the existence of sub-national minorities," particularly to respond to threats from time to time of successionism in the province of Quebec, which could be generalized to other nations with vocal minorities.
3. "advertising has become so pervasive in Canadian politics that issues requiring popular support are more than likely to be brought to the public directly through advertising campaigns."

Branding National Myths and Symbols was first coined in 2009 by Turkish-Australian scholar Hatice Sitki, who proposed in Myths, Symbols and Branding: Turkish National Identity and the EU, that these long-existing myths keep us from truly understanding and working with the "other". Sitki proposes that cultural misunderstanding will continue between nations until they understand one another's cultural myths and symbols. Sitki explains in the Cyclical Formula "Us/Other+Other", how Turkey and the European Union can benefit by accepting that they have, and continue, to play a "triple role" to one another.

BNMS argues that collective groups such as the EU do not need to be "branded" in order to improve their economic value. Rather, they need to be branded to achieve their cultural goal of moving from a "poly-cultural" society to becoming a "multicultural" society. One way for this to be achieved is for nations to realise and work with the hidden meanings of their myths and symbols. Vijay Prashad proposes that the concept of polyculturalism is a way to combat anti-racism. Prashad defines poly cultures as a "provisional concept grounded in antiracism, rather than in diversity..." Roger Hewitt takes a different approach to how peoples with different languages can understand each other. Hewitt argues that the concept of polyculturalism is "not intrinsically equal."

The "national myths" used in Masterpiece Theatre lead to "strengthen[ing] imperial attitudes", according to a 2009 book about the spate of Victorian British novels made in films from the 1980s through the 21st Century, and sources it cited.

Elizabeth Hafkin Pleck argues that the "invented tradition ... of Kwanzaa" was equivalent to the American Indian challenge to "the National myth of inclusion of Thanksgiving...."

== See also ==
- Euromyth
- Fortress Europe
- Index of public relations-related articles
- Music and political warfare
- National Anthem Project
- National branding
- National myth
- Propaganda
- Public diplomacy
