= José Antonio Torres (director) =

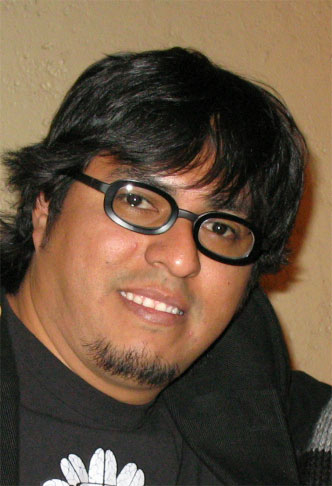
- José Antonio Torres in 2009
- Born: José Antonio Torres Marín; July 18, 1973 (age 51); Mexico City, Mexico
- Occupation(s): Director, producer, musician
- Years active: 2001–present
- Children: 2

José Antonio Torres (born Julio 18, 1973) is a Mexican film director, producer, and musician based at Inukshuk Films Studios. His film work includes writing and directing Octavio and Astral; both films were breakthroughs in digital cinema in Mexico.

== Life and career ==
Torres was born in Mexico City. He studied filmmaking at UDC and graduated from the school in 2003. He founded Inukshuk Films in June 2004.

He is best known as the frontman of the influential alternative rock band Zalvia, with whom he performs under the stage name Antonio "Toño" Torres.

In an interview with Zona Indie' s Danniel Dissolu, Torres explained his singular vision for Octavio: "What really interested me was the idea of the most incredible metamorphic paintings being made by a child prodigy, turned now in one of the most prolific Mexican artist."

Torres has started working on his next film, Bostik, set for release early 2012 coproduced by E Corp.

He has a son named Antonio and a daughter named Andrea. He lives in Mexico City.

== Filmography ==
- Astral (2001) (Director)
- De entre los zapatos (2002) (Cinematographer)
- De Eros & Danza (2002) (Director)
- KCl Doce y cuarto (2003) (PA)
- La voz de las cigarras (2005) (PA)
- Barragán en corto (2010) (Editor)
- Octavio (2011) (Director, Executive producer)
- Bostik (2012) (Director)
