= José Antonio Torres (Cuban journalist) =

Cuban journalist

- Occupation: Journalist
- Organization: Granma
- Known for: Imprisoned on espionage charges
- Spouse: Mayda Mercedes

José Antonio Torres is a Cuban journalist who has worked as a correspondent for the government daily Granma and who has been imprisoned on spying charges since May 2011.

== Early life and education ==
He received his journalism degree in 1990.

== Career ==
He first served as deputy director of Tele Turquino, then became a correspondent, in turn, for the National Information Agency and for Noticiero Nacional. He then became a correspondent for Granma in Santiago, Cuba's second largest city.

He was a sports commentator. He also served as general secretary of the organization of Communist Party journalists in Santiago de Cuba.

== Arrest and imprisonment ==
In July 2010, he published a 5,000-word article on the mismanagement of an aqueduct project. It was reportedly praised by President Raúl Castro, who wrote that “this is the spirit that should characterise the (Communist) Party press: transparent, critical and self-critical.” Four months later, Torres published a report on the installation of fiber-optic cable between Cuba and Venezuela. Torres noted that the Vice President Ramiro Valdés was responsible for the supervision of both projects.

On February 8, 2011, he was arrested. After three months of incarceration in Villa Marista, he was detained in a series of other prisons and put through intense interrogations. In June 2012, he was convicted of espionage and sentenced to 14 years imprisonment for the crime of espionage. His university degree in journalism was also revoked. There was reportedly no evidence that he actually possessed state secrets. According to one source, the prisons in which he was incarcerated included two institutions on the outskirts of Santiago, first Aguadores and then Boniato.

Torres was accused of having written a letter to Michael Parmly, former head of the Office of US Interests in Havana (SINA) and of having sought a personal interview with Parmly in which he offered to provide “sensitive information...that could place national security at risk.” Torres reportedly admitted to having written such a letter but said that he had no such information and only wished to avenge some injustice that had been visited upon his wife.

It was reported that Torres appealed his conviction, but that he feared his sentence might be increased as a result of the appeal. After his arrest and during his trial, Cuba's government-controlled media “made only a few brief references to Torres’ case.”

In prison, Torres sought the support of the Patriotic Union of Cuba and its leader, Jose Daniel Ferrer. He also wrote letters to Barack Obama and to Pope Francis.

As of November 2012, Torres had not had conjugal visits from his wife in 20 months, which Ferrer viewed as “a sign that government security officials may be trying to persuade his wife to cut off their relationship.” Torres maintained his innocence, called his imprisonment a “mistake,” and expressed confidence that the government would eventually realize its mistake. According to Ferrer, Torres said that he “trusts in the revolution’s justice, and...does not want any relations with counter-revolutionaries.”

In February 2013, the Writers in Prison Committee (WiPC) of PEN International protested what it described as “a renewed wave of repression and harassment against journalists and writers in Cuba.” WiPC cited the imprisonment of Torres and another journalist, Calixto Ramón Martínez Arias, and the sentencing to prison of writer and blogger Ángel Santiesteban Prats. While calling for Martínez Arias’ “immediate and unconditional release,” WiPC called on Cuban authorities “to provide assurances that Torres’ and Santiesteban's sentences are not related to their reporting, and to make public details of their trials.”

In March 2015, Torres's case was discussed at the meeting of the Inter American Press Association (IAPA) in Panama. Later that month, Torres was transferred from Boniato prison to a minimum-security institution in the Santiago area. The IAPA expressed “appreciation” for the transfer, but reiterated its demand that Torres “be released immediately and unconditionally” and that all charges against him be dropped. Torres said that the transfer had not been his objective. “My goal is freedom. I am not nor have I ever been a spy.”

In a May 7, 2015, letter to French President Francois Hollande, who was about to visit Cuba, Reporters Without Borders called on him to “seek the immediate and unconditional release” of José Antonio Torres as well as of two other Cuban inmates, Yoeni de Jesús Guerra García and Angell Santiesteban-Prats.

== Personal life ==
Torres is married to Mayda Mercedes.
