= Positive neuroscience =

Broadly defined, positive neuroscience is the study of what the brain does well. Instead of studying mental illness, positive neuroscientists focus on valued cognitive qualities that serve to enrich personal life and/or society. Topics in positive neuroscience overlap heavily with those of positive psychology, but use neuroimaging techniques to extend beyond the behavioral level and explain the neurobiology which underpins "positive" cognitive phenomena such as intelligence, creativity, optimism, and healthy aging.

== Background ==
Though positive neuroscience is only beginning to be recognized as an emerging field, empirical research of optimal or exceptional brain functioning has been conducted at least as far back as the 1970s. Early work was confined to the use of lesion studies, and thus was only very case-specific. Human electroencephalography, first practiced in 1920, was applied to the study of creativity in the early 1970s.

As in vivo brain imaging has become more sophisticated, investigations of positive neuroscience phenomena have incorporated multiple functional neuroimaging techniques (functional magnetic resonance imaging and Positron Emission Tomography) and structural imaging (Diffusion MRI, voxel-based morphometry, in vivo magnetic resonance spectroscopy). Examples of research centers currently active in the field of positive neuroscience include Martin Seligman's lab at the University of Pennsylvania and Rex Jung's lab at the University of New Mexico, supported by The Mind Research Network.

== The Templeton Foundation ==
In 2009, the John Templeton Foundation and a committee of advisors at the University of Pennsylvania put out a call for grant proposals aimed at investigators "conducting research aimed at gaining a better understanding of the ways in which the brain enables flourishing." Qualifying projects had to "apply tools of neuroscience to positive psychological concepts", and focus on one of the following areas:

- Virtue, strength, and positive emotion: What are the neural bases of the cognitive and affective capacities that enable virtues such as discipline, persistence, honesty, compassion, love, curiosity, social and practical intelligence, courage, creativity, and optimism?
- Exceptional abilities: What is special about the brains of exceptional individuals and what can we learn from them?
- Meaning and positive purpose: How does the brain enable individuals and groups to find meaning and achieve larger goals?
- Decisions, values, and free will: How does the brain enable decisions based on values and how can decision-making be improved? What can neuroscience reveal about the nature of human freedom?
- Religious belief, prayer, and meditation: How do religious and spiritual practices affect neural function and behavior?

Fifteen research projects are now underway as part of the Positive Neuroscience Project.

== European Initiatives ==
The development of Positive Neuroscience in Europe has been supported by emerging interdisciplinary initiatives such as the European Forum for Positive Neuroscience (EUPONS), which was founded 2025 by neuroscientist Michaela Brohm-Badry. EUPONS aims to integrate findings from neuroscience, psychology, and education to better understand the neural mechanisms underlying human flourishing, motivation, and resilience. The organization promotes research, international collaboration, and the translation of scientific insights into practical applications across domains such as education, leadership, and mental health. Its activities include conferences, research-based certification programs, and the development of European frameworks for evidence-based practice in Positive Neuroscience.
