= Paul T. P. Wong =

Canadian psychologist and academic (1937–2024)

Paul T. P. Wong Ph.D.
- 王载宝
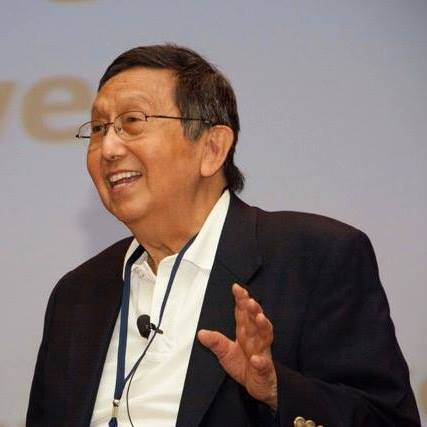
- Wong speaking at the Lotus Foundation in Taiwan, 2013
- Pronunciation: Wáng Zàibǎo
- Born: April 1, 1937; Tianjin, China
- Died: October 21, 2024 (aged 87)
- Education: Ph.D., University of Toronto, 1970
- Occupations: President, Meaning-Centered Counselling Institute Inc.; Adjunct Professor, Saybrook University; Professor Emeritus, Trent University; Professor Emeritus, Trinity Western University
- Organization: International Network on Personal Meaning
- Known for: Meaning Therapy; Second Wave Positive Psychology
- Spouse: Lilian C. J. Wong
- Children: 2
- Website: www.drpaulwong.com

Paul T. P. Wong (April 1, 1937 – October 21, 2024) was a Canadian clinical psychologist and professor. His research career has gone through four stages, with significant contributions in each stage: learning theory, social cognition, existential psychology, and positive psychology. He is most known for his integrative work on death acceptance, meaning therapy, and second wave positive psychology (PP 2.0). He has been elected as a fellow for both the American Psychological Association and the Canadian Psychological Association.

Wong is the Founder and President of the International Network on Personal Meaning and Editor-in-Chief of the International Journal of Existential Psychology and Psychotherapy. With more than 300 publications in journals and book chapters, his major books are the two editions of The Human Quest for Meaning: A Handbook of Psychological Research and Clinical Applications (1998) and The Human Quest for Meaning: Theories, Research, and Applications (2012), as well as The Handbook of Multicultural Perspectives on Stress and Coping (2006).

Wong was adjunct professor at Saybrook University and Professor Emeritus of Trent University and Trinity Western University. At the latter, he was the Founding Director of the Graduate Counselling Psychology Program. He also taught at the University of Texas at Austin, York University, and the Graduate Division of the University of Toronto. He died in October 2024.

== Personal life and death ==
Wong was born in Tianjin, China in 1937 and migrated to Hong Kong in 1948. He came to Canada as an international student in 1961, earning his B.Th. from the Toronto Bible College (now Tyndale University College and Seminary) in 1964 and B.A. in Honours Psychology from Carleton University in 1967. In 1970, he earned his Ph.D. in psychology from the University of Toronto.

Wong's career straddles two domains: psychology and Christian ministry. He first served as the Founding Pastor of the Chinese Gospel Church in Toronto in the early 1960s, and then started the Peterborough Chinese Christian Fellowship in the 1970s while teaching at Trent University. He was involved in resettling the boat people in the 1980s. Afterward, he founded the graduate program in counselling psychology at Trinity Western University in the early 1990s. During his tenure, he started a neighbours-together program and received a Cultural Harmony Award from VanCity for his community outreach.

Wong died on October 21, 2024, at the age of 87.

== Research ==
Wong's research career has covered several domains in psychology: learning theory, social cognition, existential psychology, and positive psychology.

=== Learning theory ===
Wong's first decade of research in the area of animal learning focused on how to develop persistence in animals in spite of frustration or pain. Through a variety of intermittent reinforcement and punishment schedules, he taught animals persistence in overcoming prolonged failure. This series of research provided an animal model of the positive psychology of optimism and grit as well as the empirical basis for his deep-and-wide hypothesis of negative situations. His research on persistence has also led to Rosenbaum's development of learned resourcefulness.

=== Social cognition ===
In the area of social cognition, Wong's main contribution was the demonstration of spontaneous attribution, both causal and existential. As well, Wong demonstrated that internal and external control are two separate dimensions rather than opposite poles on the same continuum. This finding later led to the development of the dual-system model of adaptation and the dialectical approach to positive psychology.

Wong's main contribution to stress and coping research is the resource-congruence model and the Stress Appraisal Measure (SAM). Wong also made the case that effective coping needs to be a part of positive psychology in his second wave of positive psychology (PP 2.0).

In the area of positive aging and dying, Wong redirected the concept of successful aging from an emphasis on physical and biological factors to a psychological and spiritual orientation. Wong also developed the Death Attitude Profile-Revised (DAP-R), which includes three kinds of death acceptance as positive ways to cope with the reality of death.

=== Existential psychology ===
Wong developed a pluralistic and integrative known as meaning therapy. Based on Viktor Frankl's logotherapy, meaning therapy also incorporates cognitive behavioral therapy, positive psychotherapy, and research findings on meaning and purpose. Wong's main conceptual contribution to meaning therapy is identifying four components of meaning: Purpose, Understanding, Responsible Actions, and Enjoyment/Evaluation (the PURE model). Meaning therapy interventions focus on self-transcendence, such as reframing bad situations into some larger meaningful context and pursuing some life goal that is larger than oneself. Currently, he is a Virtue Scholar of the collaborative working group on Virtue, Happiness, and the Meaning of Life, funded by the John Templeton Foundation.

=== Positive psychology 2.0 ===
Wong's integration of existential psychology with positive psychology resulted in Existential Positive Psychology, which recognizes the existential concerns and dark side of human existence. Later, this was broadened to become the second wave of positive psychology (PP 2.0), which acknowledges the importance of the dialectical Yin-Yang principle and Asian indigenous psychology. PP 2.0 is based on the foundation of the co-existence of opposites as essential for human development and flourishing.

Wong has given positive psychology away through his Meaningful Living MeetUp group since 2011. Participants learn basic principles of meaning and new ways of relating to each other. This outreach program was intended to improve mental health at the grassroots level.

=== International psychology ===
Wong's contribution to cross-cultural and international psychology is threefold. The first was his emphasis on the importance of cross-cultural perspectives in stress and coping and positive psychology. In addition, he has been organizing the Biennial International Meaning Conference since 2000. At the ninth Biennial International Meaning Conference, he organized the first Second Wave Positive Psychology Summit.

His research on death acceptance and the meaning of life impacted Taiwan's Life and Death Education. He has given lecture tours in Taiwan and was awarded the 12th Global Love of Life Medal from the Chou Ta-kuan Cultural & Educational Foundation, the Lifetime Achievement Award in Life Education by the National Taipei University of Nursing and Health, and the Rising Great Compassion Award from the Buddhist Lotus Hospice Care Foundation.

== Selected publications ==
Wong has published over 300 articles and chapters and authored or edited 11 books and monographs. The following is a selected list of his most cited papers.

- Wong, P. T. P., & Weiner, B. (1981). When people ask "Why" questions and the heuristic of attributional search. Journal of Personality and Social Psychology, 40(4), 650–663. [Cited by 1133]
- Reker, G. T., & Wong, P. T. P. (1988). Aging as an individual process: Towards a theory of personal meaning. In J. E. Birren, & V. L. Bengston (Eds.), Emergent theories of aging (pp. 214–246). New York, NY: Springer. [Cited by 525]
- Reker, G. T., Peacock, E. J., & Wong, P. T. P. (1987). Meaning and purpose in life and well-being: A life-span perspective. Journal of Gerontology, 42, 44–49. [Cited by 483]
- Wong, P. T. P., Reker, G. T., & Gesser, G. (1994). Death Attitude Profile – Revised: A multidimensional measure of attitudes toward death (DAP-R). In R. A. Neimeyer (Ed.), Death anxiety handbook: Research, instrumentation, and application (pp. 121–148). Washington, DC: Taylor & Francis. [Cited by 453]
- Wong, P. T. P. (1998). Implicit theories of meaningful life and the development of the Personal Meaning Profile (PMP). In P. T. P. Wong, & P. Fry (Eds.), The human quest for meaning: A handbook of psychological research and clinical applications (pp. 111–140). Mahwah, NJ: Erlbaum. [Cited by 368]

== Selected awards and honors ==
- 1981–1986, member of the Behavior/Biological Review Panel in the National Institute of Mental Health (NIMH) in Washington, DC.
- 1994–1997, member of the National Advisory Council on Aging, an advisory body to Canada's Minister of Health in Ottawa, ON.
- 1999, recipient of the Statue of Responsibility Award from the Viktor Frankl Institute of Logotherapy Vienna, Austria.
- 2002, the Board of Governors at Trinity Western University established the Paul Wong Center for Research in Counselling Psychology.
- 2008, recipient of the Lifetime Achievement Award from the International Network on Personal Meaning, Toronto, ON.
- 2013, recipient of the Lifetime Achievement Award in Life Education at the National Taipei University of Nursing and Health, Taiwan.
- 2016, recipient of the Carl Rogers Award presented by the Society for Humanistic Psychology (Division 32) of the American Psychological Association.
