= List of positive psychologists =

A list of psychologists who have researched within the field of positive psychology.

- Albert Bandura
- Robert Biswas-Diener
- Mihaly Csikszentmihalyi
- Richard Davidson
- Ed Diener
- Carol Dweck
- Barbara Fredrickson
- Adam Grant
- Jonathan Haidt
- Todd Kashdan
- Sonja Lyubomirsky
- Christopher Peterson
- Barry Schwartz
- Martin Seligman
- Kennon Sheldon
- C. R. Snyder
- Shelley Taylor
- Everett Worthington
- Philip Zimbardo
- Lee Chambers (psychologist)
