= Michaela Brohm-Badry =

German university teacher

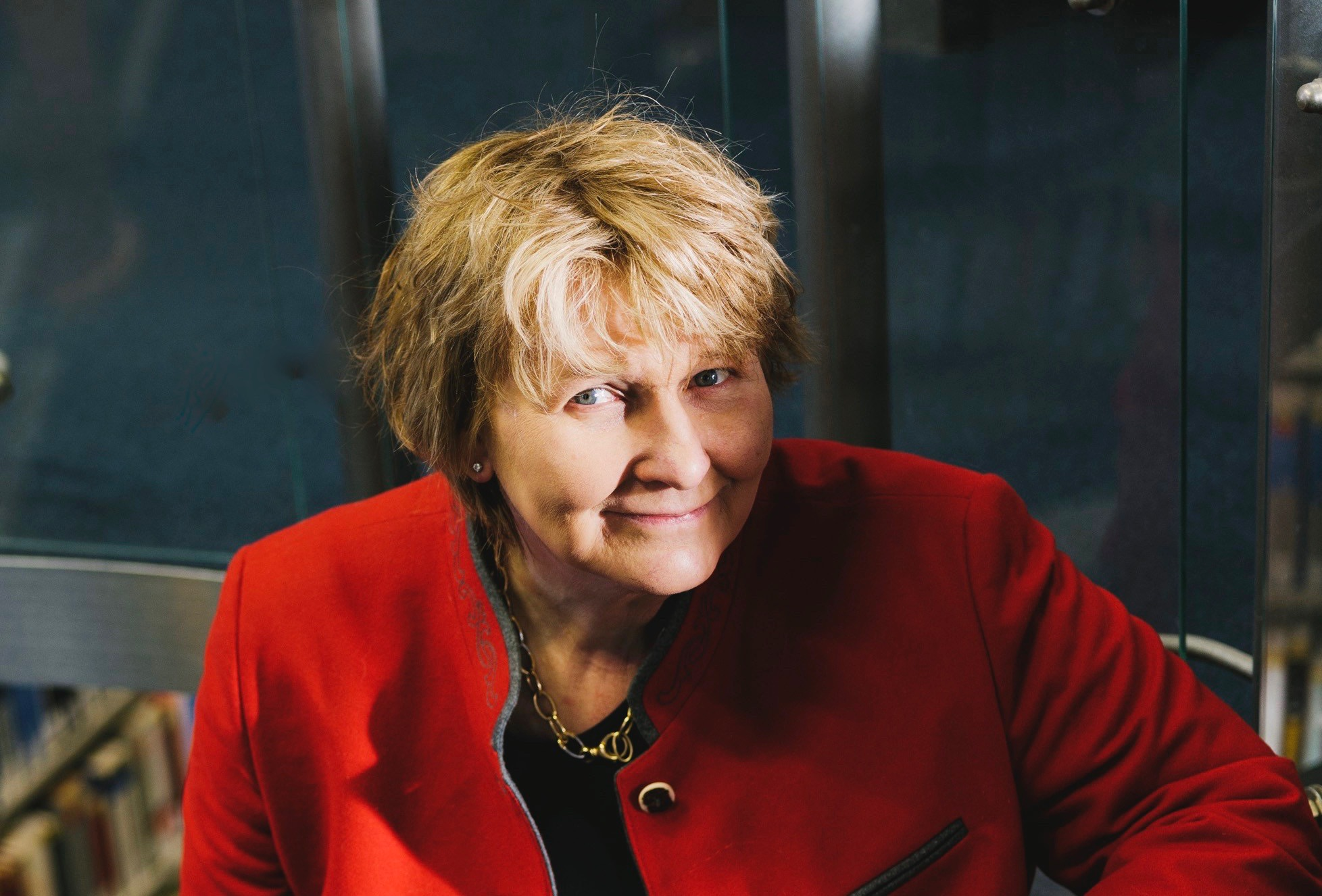
- Born: Steinfurt
- Other name: Michaela Brohm
- Education: Karlsruhe Institute of Technology (KIT), Germany Central Queensland University, Australia University of Cambridge, UK
- Scientific career
- Fields: Education, Motivation, Positive Psychology, Neuroscience
- Workplaces: University of Trier (Professor and Dean)
- Website: www.brohm-badry.de

Michaela Brohm-Badry is a German professor for Learning and Instruction at the University of Trier (Germany, Rhineland Palatinate).

== Research ==
Her scientific research is focused on the links between motivation, well-being and achievement. She popularizes positive-psychological and motivational science for education and leadership purposes as an author for scholarly press publishers. And she transfer that knowledge to the broader German population as a public person through the German news media and the German Press Agency. She is the organizer of the first German University postgraduate program on Positive Psychology in Germany.

== Professional Background ==
Brohm-Badry acquired her doctorate degree in musicology at the University of Fridericiana Karlsruhe in 2000. She started her research into learning and motivation theories short after. In the year 2000, she became a lecturer at the University of Karlsruhe for the theory and practice of motivation. In 2007, she received and accepted the call for the chair for Learning and Instruction at the University of Trier in the interdisciplinary field of the educational sciences (pedagogy, sociology and psychology). In 2023, she obtained a master's degree in educational neuroscience at Central Queensland University.

Since 2015, Brohm-Badry has been a founder and the president of the German Society for Positive-Psychological Research (DGPPF). The DGPPF is an association of scientists from various academic backgrounds, conducting research with the aim of promoting and disseminating the science behind positive psychology. As an additional qualification for positive psychological research and application, Brohm-Badry acquired the New York Certificate in Applied Positive Psychology (NYCAPP) at the New York Open Center in March 2018. Afterwards, she has been invited to the International Positive Psychology Association conference in 2019 as a speaker. She contributes as a speaker at the Seligman Europe Tour 2019.

Brohm-Badry was a member of the expert commission for the European Commission (EU) in Seville 2020 for the creation of the Framework Personal, Social and Learning to Learn European KeyCompetence (LifeComp).
