= Meaningful life =

Fulfilling life guided by a purpose

In positive psychology, a meaningful life is a construct having to do with the purpose, significance, fulfillment, and satisfaction of life. While specific theories vary, there are two common aspects: a global schema to understand one's life and the belief that life itself is meaningful. Meaning can be defined as the connection linking two presumably independent entities together; a meaningful life links the biological reality of life to a symbolic interpretation or meaning. Those possessing a sense of meaning are generally found to be happier, to have lower levels of negative emotions, and to have lower risk of mental illness.

While there are benefits to making meaning out of life, there is still not one definitive way in which one can establish such a meaning. In psychological studies, those who were successful in creating a meaningful life enjoyed benefits such as higher levels of positive affect and life satisfaction. When faced with a stressful life situation, finding meaning is shown to help adjustment.

== Major theoretical approaches ==
Logotherapy emphasizes finding values and purpose in an individual's life, and building relationships with others in order to reach fulfilment and attain meaningfulness. "Value" can be further subcategorized into three main areas: creative, experiential, and attitudinal. Creative values are reached through acts of creating or producing something. Experiential values are actualized when a person experiences something through sight, touch, smell, or hearing. Finally, attitudinal values are reserved for individuals who cannot, for one reason or another, have new experiences or create new things. Thus they find meaning through adopting a new attitude that allows "suffering with dignity". For all of these classes of values, it is because of one's sense of responsibility that one pursues these values and consequently experiences a meaningful life. It is through the realization that one is the sole being responsible for rendering life meaningful that values are actualized and life becomes meaningful.

Terror management theory studies meaningfulness and its relationship to culture. A human's consciousness makes them aware of their own mortality. In order to deal with their inevitable death, humans attempt to leave their mark in some symbolic act of immortality within the structured society. The structure created through society and culture provides humans with a sense of order. Through the structured society we are able to create a symbolic immortality which can take various forms, e.g., monuments, theatrical productions, children, etc. Culture's order reduces death anxiety as it allows the individual to live up to the societal standards and in living up to such ideals; one is given self-esteem which counterbalances the mortal anxiety.

Hope theory operationalizes meaningfulness as having more to do with self-control that leads to higher self-esteem. As one lives by societal standards of living, one exercises self-control and it is through this self-control that higher self-esteem is achieved. Meaning is found when one realizes that one is capable and able to effectively achieve their goals through successful management. Control is "a cognitive model whereby people strive to comprehend the contingencies in their lives and achieve goals.

Narrative psychology proposes that people construct life stories as a way to understand life events and impose meaning on life, thus connecting [via explanation] the individual to the event. Meaningfulness is a subjective evaluation of how well these stories connect to the person. Furthermore, meaningfulness is actualized through positive functioning, satisfaction with life, the enjoyment of work, happiness, positive affect and hope. Meaningfulness can also be translated into physical health and a generalized well-being. Baumeister posits that meaningfulness is divided into four needs: sense of purpose, efficacy, value, and a sense of positive self-worth.

== Major empirical findings ==
Social exclusion results in a perceived loss of meaningfulness in life. Furthermore, the four needs for meaning (sense of purpose, efficacy, value and sense of positive self-worth) were found to be mediators in the perception of meaningfulness of life. When one considers themselves to be socially excluded, one's sense of purpose, efficacy, value, and self-worth are all indirectly diminished.

Recent systematic reviews addressing meaning in life found that higher meaning in life is associated to better physical health in general, lower distress among cancer patients, and higher subjective well-being in China. On the other hand, in another systematic review, a more specific type of meaning, a purpose in life, was associated to reduced mortality and cardiovascular events. Another meta-analysis found that purpose in life was in average slightly lower in older age-groups compared to younger ones.

A study found an association between the discovery of meaning and a lower rate of AIDS-related mortality. This was the first study in which the findings appear to not be mediated by health behaviors or other potential confounds. The study looked at HIV-seropositive men who had recently witnessed the death of a close friend from AIDS-related death. When confronted with the stress of such a death those men, who were able to find meaning in the loss, were subject to less rapid declines in CD4 T cell levels. Furthermore, the subjects who went through cognitive processing in response to the bereavement were more likely to find meaning in the death of the close friend. Thus in experiencing a stressful life event if one is able to engage successfully in finding meaning there is a potential link to positive immunological benefits and health outcomes.

== Relation to other concepts ==
=== Happiness ===
A happy life and a meaningful life are strongly correlated attitudes. However, happiness may be distinguished as relating more to biological needs and desires, such as the absence of pain or unpleasant experiences, while meaning is more cultural and abstract, relating to overall life satisfaction or eudaimonia. According to a research, living a meaningful life is one of the several enduring pathways to happiness. Another study found that difficulty, health, purchasing power, and a focus on the present corresponded more to happiness than meaning, while thinking about the past or the future, struggle, stress, worry, argument, anxiety, generosity, and viewing daily activities such as raising children as reflective of oneself corresponded more with finding life meaningful. Feeling more connected to others improved both happiness and meaning, according to the study. Yet, the role a person adopts in the relationships makes an important difference. Those who agreed with the statement "I am a giver" reported less happiness than those who were more likely to agree with "I am a taker". However, the "givers" reported higher levels of meaning in their lives compared to the "takers".

=== Importance ===
The desire to lead a meaningful life is closely related to the desire to lead an important life. In many cases, the two overlap: a meaningful life is often important in some sense and finding importance in life can act as a key to making life meaningful. However, it has been argued that this is not always true. So there may be cases in which the two come apart. Importance is usually defined in terms of having an impact on the world. So a person is important if they make a difference. Many theorists emphasize that not any type of difference is sufficient. On this view, the difference has to be big enough and affect the value of the world. This is usually understood in terms of well-being: a person is important to the extent that they affect the well-being of sentient beings, either directly or indirectly.

A common aspect of meaningful lives is that they are guided by a purpose. This highlights the relation to importance: in working towards realizing this purpose, the agent usually makes a difference to the world and thereby increases their importance. However, this type of conscious purpose is not required for importance. In one example, a nobleman's pants accidentally drop down the moment he is being knighted. This incident turns out to be important because, through a strange connection of events, it causes a bloody war to end. But this embarrassment does not make the nobleman's life meaningful even though it has become important. Something similar is often the case when a person unintentionally causes a butterfly effect. It has been argued that there may also be meaningful lives that are unimportant. In this regard, some people may find meaning in life through the mere appreciation of valuable things, for example, by worshipping God. Such a life lacks importance if it does not bring about a significant value difference in the world.

Some theorists argue that leading a meaningful life is a better goal than leading an important life. This is usually based on the idea that importance can take a negative form by making a big negative impact on the world. In this regard, a person who craves importance above everything else may decide to cause harm to the social order. For example, they may resolve to kill a famous political leader in the quest to leave their mark on the world.

=== Existential crisis ===
An existential crisis is an inner conflict based on the impression that one's life lacks meaning. This impression leads to a conflict because there is a strong desire to lead a meaningful life, which is frustrated by it. Existentialists often refer to the discrepancy between the desire for meaning and the lack thereof as "the absurd". Existential crises express themselves in negative experiences, like stress, anxiety, despair, and depression. In some cases, this even leads to a disruption of the regular everyday life activities of the individual. Existential crises constitute a psychological challenge to the person's perspective on the world and themselves.

Different responses to this challenge have been suggested in the academic literature. Some theorists with a nihilistic outlook accept the basic premise that life is meaningless and provide suggestions on how to best cope with this fact. They often focus on the freedom that comes with being unbound from any predetermined purpose. Nonetheless, the more commonly recommended approach is to discover new sources of meaning in one's life. Theorists from a religious background often suggest a leap of faith. A leap of faith implies committing oneself to a new system of meaning, such as a religious doctrine, even though one does not fully understand it yet. The idea behind this approach is that the individual may come to see and experience their life as meaningful from the perspective of this new system of thought and thereby avoid the existential crisis. However, this approach may not be available to more rationally minded people and is often criticized based on its blind affirmation of a creed not properly understood or justified. A different approach for more rationally inclined individuals is to search and evaluate new sources of meaning based on proper reflection and personal experience. This often takes the less ambitious form of discovering ways how one's personal life matters and is worth living. For example, the individual may find meaning in their life this way by dedicating themselves to their family or to an artistic endeavor. This contrasts with other approaches that seek to uncover the cosmic meaning of life on the largest scale or the purpose of the world as a whole.

== Applications ==
A meaningful life is associated with positive functioning: life satisfaction, enjoyment of work, happiness, general positive affect, hope and in general a higher level of well-being.

Psychological adjustment in the event of a stressor has been linked with meanings finding whether in the form of benefit seeking or making sense of the loss. In terms of how meaning is manifested, making sense of the loss seems to be more important earlier on in the adjustment process after the loss whereas perceiving the benefit may be a more long term process that occurs over time with the greatest benefit usually experienced later on (Davis, Nolen-Hoeksema & Larson, 1998).

Based on systematic reviews, there are various promising therapies and interventions that focus on increasing meaning or purpose in life. Many of these interventions have been created for patients with advanced disease.

== See also ==
- Meaning-making
- Philosophy of happiness
