= Kennon Sheldon =

Kennon Marshall Sheldon is a professor of psychological sciences at the University of Missouri in Columbia, Missouri. His research is in the areas of well-being, motivation, self-determination theory, personality, and positive psychology. In 2002 he was a recipient of a Templeton Foundation "Positive Psychology" prize and in 2014 received the Ed and Carol Diener award for mid-career achievement in personality psychology. He is the author of Optimal Human Being: An Integrated Multi-level Perspective, Self-determination Theory in the Clinic: Motivating physical and mental health, and has written and edited several other academic books, as well as more than 200 academic articles and book chapters.
