= Psychological intervention =

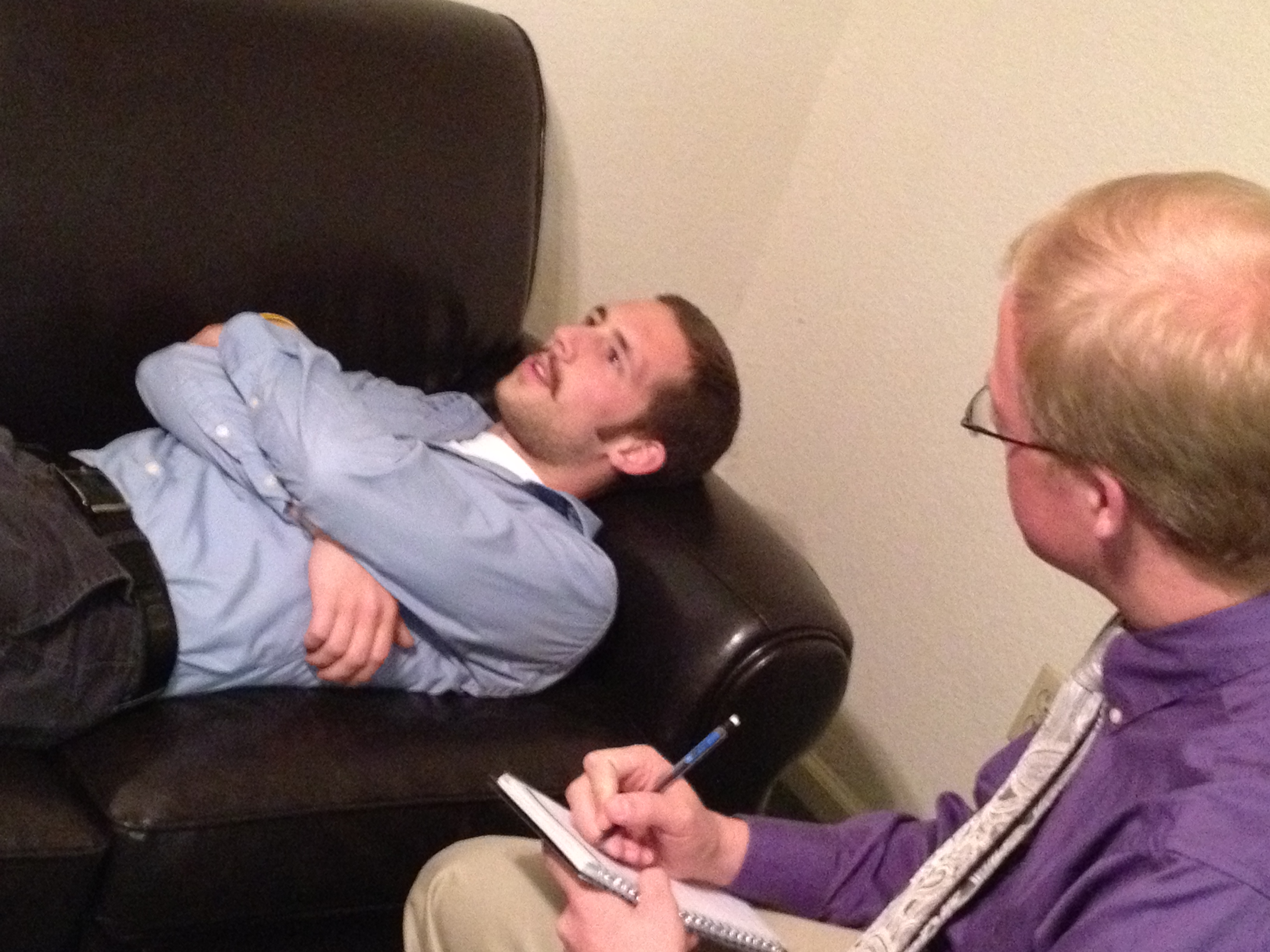
- Psychotherapy
- Specialty: Applied psychology
- Outcomes: Change

In applied psychology, interventions are actions performed to bring about change in people. A wide range of intervention strategies exist and they are directed towards various types of issues. Most generally, it means any activities used to modify behavior, emotional state, or feelings. Psychological interventions have many different applications and the most common use is for the treatment of mental disorders, most commonly using psychotherapy. The ultimate goal behind these interventions is not only to alleviate symptoms but also to target the root cause of mental disorders.

To treat mental disorders psychological interventions can be coupled with psychoactive medication. Psychiatrists commonly prescribe drugs to manage symptoms of mental disorders. Psychosocial interventions have a greater or more direct focus on a person's social environment in interaction with their psychological functioning.

Psychological interventions can also be used to promote good mental health in order to prevent mental disorders. These interventions are not tailored towards treating a condition but are designed to foster healthy emotions, attitudes and habits. Such interventions can improve quality of life even when mental illness is not present.

Interventions can be diverse and can be tailored specifically to the individual or group receiving treatment depending on their needs. This versatility adds to their effectiveness in addressing any kind of situation.

== Psychotherapy ==
Psychotherapy, also known as talk therapy, promotes a relationship between a trained psychotherapist and a person suffering from a psychological disorder.

Positive activity interventions (PAIs) are a part of positive psychology. PAIs can be used in psychotherapy as well as outside of it. Examples include helping clients to focus on good things, the future self, gratitude, affirmation of the self and kindness towards others.

Psychotherapy is a method that addresses both psychological and emotional issues/challenges by using verbal communication between a certified therapist and an individual, family, or couple, etc. The treatment aims to elevate the patients well-being, lower their stress levels, and promote personalized growth. It can be seen being used to treat mental health issues such as depression, anxiety, and relationship problems. Psychotherapy can be dated back to the late 19th century, where Freud created the early system of psychotherapy, which is psychoanalysis. From the 19th century til today, psychotherapy has evolved into a widely used practice, contributing to the care for mental health worldwide. This form of therapy stands out for its holistic and long-term approach to addressing psychological challenges that people face. The effects of Psychotherapy don't diminish as medications effects would, the self-help strategies developed in Psychotherapy are viewed as sustainable.

== Pharmaceutical therapy ==
Pharmaceutical drugs are a frequently used intervention in the field of psychiatry, with targeted drugs available for a wide variety of conditions e.g Major Depressive Disorder, Bipolar Disorder, or Generalized Anxiety Disorder, among others. A typical course of treatment with psychotropic medication will involve an initial psychiatric screening, followed by periodic monitoring over the course of treatment to adjust specific dosages or prescriptions, as efficacy and potential side effects vary widely across differing medications

The first available psychiatric drugs on the market were neuroleptics, now commonly known as antipsychotics, such as Thorazine, which are used to treat disorders with psychotic symptoms such as Schizophrenia or Bipolar Disorder, though are sometimes prescribed off-label to treat others such as depression with or without psychotic symptoms. These drugs typically work as dopamine antagonists, in line with the dopamine hypothesis of psychotic manifestation. Although showing significant efficacy in reducing acute symptoms of psychosis and its rate of occurrence, antipsychotics have a comparatively higher side effect profile to other psychotropic drugs, such as weight gain, movement disorders (dyskinesia), or, in rare cases, neuroleptic malignant syndrome, a severe and potentially fatal reaction to antipsychotic drugs.

Selective Serotonin Reuptake Inhibitors (SSRIs) are the most widely prescribed psychotropic drugs prescribed in the United States, due to their comparatively mild side effects and versatile efficacy profile compared to other psychotropic drug classes, and are primarily used for treating major depressive disorder or anxiety disorders. Effectiveness varies substantially between individual drugs, with negative or unsatisfactorily mild effects being experienced by some patients. In patients experiencing treatment resistant depression or anxiety disorders, psychiatrists may prescribe SSRIs in combination with other drugs such as antipsychotics or benzodiazepines

== Cognitive Intervention ==
Cognitive intervention is a therapeutic approach that focuses on addressing and modifying cognitive processes, thoughts, and beliefs to bring about positive changes in an individual's emotional and behavioral well-being. This form of intervention is commonly used in the field of psychology and mental health to help individuals overcome various challenges, such as anxiety, depression, addiction, and post-traumatic stress disorder (PTSD)

Key elements of cognitive intervention include:

- Cognitive Restructuring: This technique involves identifying and challenging irrational or negative thought patterns and replacing them with more realistic and positive ones. By changing thought processes, individuals can often change their emotional responses and behaviors.
- Cognitive Behavioral Therapy (CBT): CBT is a widely used form of cognitive intervention that combines cognitive restructuring with behavioral techniques. It helps individuals recognize and modify unhelpful thought patterns and behaviors that contribute to their psychological distress.
- Mindfulness and Meditation: Mindfulness-based interventions teach individuals to observe their thoughts without judgment and cultivate a greater awareness of the present moment. These practices can help reduce stress and improve overall mental well-being.
- Cognitive Rehabilitation: In cases of cognitive deficits due to conditions like traumatic brain injury or neurodegenerative diseases, cognitive intervention may involve specific rehabilitation exercises and strategies to improve cognitive functioning.
- Problem-Solving Skills: Cognitive intervention often includes teaching individuals effective problem-solving skills to manage life's challenges more adaptively.

Overall, cognitive intervention aims to empower individuals to gain better control over their thoughts and emotions, leading to improved mental health and enhanced coping skills to navigate life's difficulties. It is a widely respected and evidence-based approach in the field of psychology and psychotherapy.

== See also ==
- Shakubuku
- Wake-up call
