= Positive psychology of relationships =

Positive psychology of relationships is a subfield of positive psychology that focuses on understanding, cultivating, and enhancing the positive aspects of interpersonal relationships. Examples include positive intimate relationships, workplace relationships, and relationships across different stages of life – from youth through adolescence to older adulthood.

== Theoretical frameworks ==
=== Capitalization ===
Langston introduced the concept of capitalization in 1994, referring to the process of taking advantage of positive events by sharing them with close others. This has shown to improve relationships through increased intimacy and lower emotional distress. According to Peters, the process of capitalization is not only beneficial for the individual sharing the good news, but also for the person to whom they tell their news.

Shelly Gable identified four types of capitalization responses: active-constructive (e.g., enthusiastic support), passive-constructive (e.g., quiet, understated support), active-destructive (e.g., demeaning the event), and passive-destructive (e.g., ignoring the event). Gable uses the following example to illustrate these responses:

Maria comes home from her job as an associate in a law firm and excitedly tells her husband, Robert, that the senior partners called her into a meeting today and assigned her to be the lead lawyer for an important case filed on behalf of their most prestigious client.

An active–constructive response from Robert might be, "Wow, this is great news! Your skills and hard work are definitely paying off; I am certain that your goal to make partner will happen in no time. What is the case about?"

A passive–constructive response could be a warm smile followed by a simple, "That's nice, dear."

An active–destructive response might be, "Wow, I bet the case will be complicated; are you sure you can handle it? It sounds like it might be a lot of work; maybe no one else wanted the case. You will probably have to work even longer hours this month."

A passive–destructive response might be, "You won't believe what happened to me today," or "What do you want to do for dinner?"

Gable and colleagues found that the active-constructive response in close relationships were associated with higher relationship well-being (e.g., intimacy, daily marital satisfaction).

== Research ==
=== Social networks ===
A social network impacts the psychological well-being of a person. Research among 222 students showed that the 10% happiest students spent less time alone and were more satisfied in their relationships than the 10% least happy students. A meta-analysis also confirms that larger social networks correlate with higher psychological well-being.

Using network analysis tools, Fowler and Christakis conducted a study to examine how happiness spreads through social connections. They measured the happiness effects between friends (one degree of separation), friends of friends (two degrees), and friends of friends of friends (three degrees). The results indicated that having a happy friend increases the likelihood of a person being happy by 15.3%, while the effect was 9.8% for second-degree connections and 5.6% for third-degree connections.

=== Friendship ===
Several studies have found that the quality of friendships contributes more to well-being than the quantity of friendships. A study of 280 college students examined friendship quality and well-being. Students ranked their friends, rating relationships on companionship, intimacy, reliability, and affection. Results showed that only the quality of the best friendship significantly predicted well-being.
