= Positive psychology =

Approach of psychological scientific study

Positive psychology is the scientific study of conditions and processes that contribute to positive psychological states (e.g., contentment, joy), well-being, positive relationships, and positive institutions.

Positive psychology emerged in the 1990s in response to psychopathology, also known as "negative psychology." Positive psychology became more widespread as a new domain of psychology in 1998 when American Psychological Association (APA) president and University of Pennsylvania professor, Martin Seligman, chose it as the theme of the national convention. Positive psychology studies the average individual, including their functioning, optimal experience, and overall well-being. It builds on the humanistic movement of Abraham Maslow and Carl Rogers, which encourages an emphasis on happiness, well-being, and purpose.

Positive psychology largely relies on concepts from the Western philosophical tradition, such as the Aristotelian concept of eudaimonia, which is typically rendered in English with the terms "flourishing", "the good life," or "happiness". Positive psychologists study empirically the conditions and processes that contribute to flourishing, subjective well-being, and happiness, often using these terms interchangeably. Constructs aligning with positive psychology such as optimism and hope have long been prominent in Western History. However, Eastern philosophies still have made an impact on positive psychology as well. Eastern philosophies often center around compassion, harmony, and balance, which all contribute to the study of positive psychology.

Positive psychologists suggest several factors that may contribute to happiness and subjective well-being. These include strong social ties such asː family, friends, colleagues, and wider networks, involvement in clubs or social organization, regular physical exercise, and practices like meditation. Spiritual practice and religious commitment is another possible source for increased well-being. Its key principles focus on the positive aspects of human experience, a strengths-based approach that identifies individual strengths, like optimism, resilience and gratitude. It emphasizes one's overall well-being and promotes engagement and relationships. It also differentiates hedonic (pleasure-seeking) and eudaemonic (purpose and fulfillment) happiness.

Positive psychology has practical applications in various fields, including education, the workplace, community development, and mental healthcare. This domain of psychology aims to enrich individuals' lives by promoting well-being and fostering positive experiences and characteristics, thereby contributing to a more fulfilling and meaningful life.

== History ==
=== Influences from ancient history ===
The works of Aristotle include elements of what is now called positive psychology.

Before the first use of the term "positive psychology," researchers focused on topics that would now be included under the umbrella of positive psychology. Some view positive psychology as a meeting of Eastern thought, such as Buddhism and Hinduism, and Western psychodynamic approaches.

The historical Western roots of positive psychology are found in the teachings of Aristotle, whose Nicomachean Ethics is a description of the theory and practice of human flourishing—which he referred to as eudaimonia (a Greek word literally translating to the state or condition of good spirit, and which is commonly translated as happiness or welfare)—of the tutelage necessary to achieve it, and of the psychological obstacles to its practice. It teaches the cultivation of virtues as the means of attaining happiness and well-being.

=== Influences from psychological domains and theoretical foundations ===
Scientific research on well-being dates back to the 1950s. Several humanistic psychologists, most notably Maslow, Carl Rogers, and Erich Fromm, developed theories and practices pertaining to human happiness and flourishing. More recently, positive psychologists have found empirical support for the humanistic theories of flourishing.

In 1984, psychologist Ed Diener published his tripartite model of subjective well-being, which posited "three distinct but often related components of wellbeing: frequent positive affect, infrequent negative affect, and cognitive evaluations such as life satisfaction." In this model, cognitive, affective, and contextual factors contribute to subjective well-being. According to Diener and Suh, subjective well-being is "based on the idea that how each person thinks and feels about his or her life is important."

Carol Ryff's six-factor model of psychological well-being was first published in 1989. It postulates that self-acceptance, personal growth, purpose in life, environmental mastery, autonomy, and positive relations with others are crucial to well-being.

According to Corey Keyes, who collaborated with Carol Ryff and used the term flourishing as a central concept, mental well-being has three components: hedonic (i.e. subjective or emotional), psychological, and social well-being. Hedonic well-being concerns emotional aspects of well-being, whereas psychological and social well-being, e.g. eudaimonic well-being, concerns skills, abilities, and optimal functioning. This tripartite model of mental well-being has received cross-cultural empirical support.

=== Key figures ===
The positive psychology movement was first founded in 1998 by Martin Seligman. He was concerned that mainstream psychology focused too much on disease, disorders, and disabilities rather than on well-being, resilience, and recovery. He aimed to apply the methodological, scientific, scholarly, and organizational strengths of mainstream psychology to promote well-being instead of focusing on illness and disease.

The field has been influenced by humanistic and psychodynamic approaches to treatment. Predating the use of the term "positive psychology", researchers within the field of psychology had focused on topics that would now be included under this new denomination.

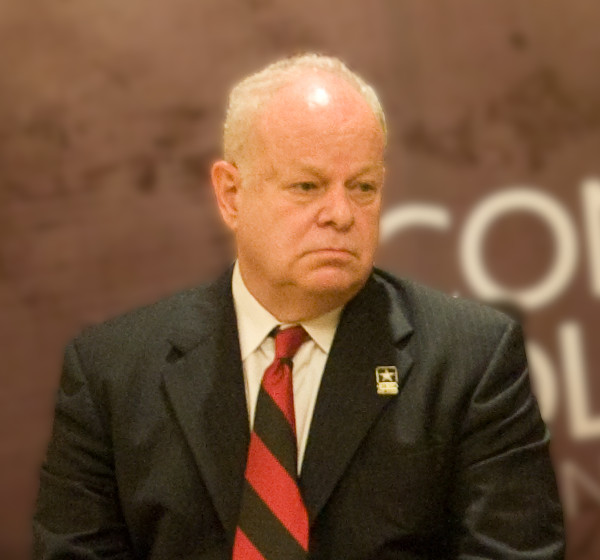
To Seligman, psychology (particularly its positive branch) can investigate and promote realistic ways of fostering more well-being in people and communities.

The term "positive psychology" dates at least to 1954, when Abraham Maslow's Motivation and Personality was published with a final chapter titled "Toward a Positive Psychology." In the second edition published in 1970, he removed that chapter, saying in the preface that "a positive psychology is at least available today though not very widely." There have been indications that psychologists since the 1950s have increasingly focused on promoting mental health rather than merely treating mental illness. From the beginning of psychology, the field addressed the human experience using the "Disease model," studying and identifying the dysfunction of a person.

In the opening sentence of his book Authentic Happiness, Seligman claimed: "For the last half century psychology has been consumed with a single topic only—mental illness," expanding on Maslow's comments half a century earlier. He urged psychologists to continue the earlier missions of psychology of nurturing talent and improving everyday life.

=== Development ===
The first positive psychology summit took place in 1999. The First International Conference on Positive Psychology took place in 2002. In September 2005, the first master's program in applied positive psychology (MAPP) was launched at the University of Pennsylvania. In 2006, a course on positive psychology at Harvard University was one of the most popular courses on offer. In June 2009, the First World Congress on Positive Psychology took place in Philadelphia.

The field of positive psychology today is most advanced in the United States, Canada, Western Europe, and Australia.

== Core concepts ==
=== Core principles ===
Positive psychology, as defined by Martin Seligman and Mihaly Csikszentmihalyi is "the scientific study of positive human functioning and flourishing on multiple levels that include the biological, personal, relational, institutional, cultural, and global dimensions of life."

Positive psychology aims to complement and extend traditional problem-focused psychology. It concerns positive states (e.g. happiness), positive traits (e.g. talents, interests, strengths of character), positive relationships, and positive institutions and how these apply to physical health.

Seligman proposes that a person can best promote their well-being by nurturing their character strengths. Seligman identifies other possible goals of positive psychology: families and schools that allow children to grow, workplaces that aim for satisfaction and high productivity, and teaching others about positive psychology.

A basic premise of positive psychology is that human actions arise from our anticipations about the future; these anticipations are informed by our past experiences.

Those who practice positive psychology attempt psychological interventions that foster positive attitudes toward one's subjective experiences, individual traits, and life events. The goal is to minimize pathological thoughts that may arise in a hopeless mindset and to develop a sense of optimism toward life. Positive psychologists seek to encourage acceptance of one's past, excitement and optimism about one's future, and a sense of contentment and well-being in the present.

==== Happiness ====
Two definitions: Happiness can be understood both as an enjoyable state of mind and the living of an enjoyable, fulfilling life.

==== Quality of life ====
Quality of life refers to overall well-being, encompassing not just physical and mental health but also socioeconomic factors. This concept is subjective and may vary across different cultures and regions.

=== Topics of Focus ===
Positive psychology according to Seligman and Christopher Peterson, addresses three issues:

1. Positive emotions: These include contentment with the past, happiness with the present, and hope for the future.
2. Positive individual traits: These are strengths and virtues that define individuals.
3. Positive institutions: Organizations, systems, and institutions (schools, families, and communities) that promote better well-being. These things should be creating supportive environments, fairness, engagement, and having a positive environment

According to Peterson, positive psychologists are concerned with four topics: positive experiences, enduring psychological traits, positive relationships, and positive institutions. He also states that topics of interest to researchers in the field are states of pleasure or flow, values, strengths, virtues, talents, as well as the ways that these can be promoted by social systems and institutions.

== Theoretical frameworks ==
There is no accepted "gold standard" theory in positive psychology. The work of Seligman is regularly quoted, as is the work of Csikszentmihalyi, and older models of well-being, such as Ryff's six-factor model of psychological well-being and Diener's tripartite model of subjective well-being.

Later, Paul Wong introduced the concept of second-wave positive psychology.

=== Initial theory: three paths to happiness ===
In Authentic Happiness (2002) Seligman proposed three kinds of a happy life that can be investigated:

1. Pleasant life: research into the pleasant life, or the "life of enjoyment", examines how people optimally experience, forecast, and savor the positive feelings and emotions that are part of normal and healthy living (e.g. relationships, hobbies, interests, entertainment, etc.). Seligman says this most transient element of happiness may be the least important.
2. Good Life: investigation of the beneficial effects of immersion, absorption, and flow felt by people when optimally engaged with their primary activities, is the study of the Good Life, or the "life of engagement". Flow is experienced when there is a match between a person's strengths and their current task, i.e. when one feels confident of accomplishing a chosen or assigned task. Related concepts include self-efficacy and play.
3. Meaningful Life: inquiry into the meaningful life, or "life of affiliation", questions how people derive a positive sense of well-being, belonging, meaning, and purpose from being part of and contributing back to something larger and more enduring than themselves (e.g. nature, social groups, organizations, movements, traditions, belief systems).

=== PERMA ===
PERMA model

In Flourish (2011), Seligman argued that the last category of his proposed three kinds of a happy life, "meaningful life", can be considered as three different categories. The resulting summary for this theory is the mnemonic acronym PERMA: Positive Emotions, Engagement, Relationships, Meaning, and Achievements or Accomplishments.

Positive emotions
include a wide range of feelings, not just happiness and joy, but excitement, satisfaction, pride, and awe, amongst others. These are connected to positive outcomes, such as longer life and healthier social relationships.
Engagement
refers to involvement in activities that draw and build upon one's interests. Csikszentmihalyi explains true engagement as flow, a state of deep effortless involvement, a feeling of intensity that leads to a sense of ecstasy and clarity. The task being done must call upon a particular skill and it should be possible while being a little bit challenging. Engagement involves passion for and concentration on the task at hand—complete absorption and loss of self-consciousness.
Relationships
are essential in fueling positive emotions, whether they are work-related, familial, romantic, or platonic. As Peterson puts it, "other people matter." Humans receive, share, and spread positivity to others through relationships. Relationships are important in bad times and good times. Relationships can be strengthened by reacting to one another positively. Typically positive things take place in the presence of other people.
Meaning
is also known as purpose, and answers the question of "why?" Discovering a clear "why" puts everything into context from work to relationships to other parts of life. Finding meaning is learning that there is something greater than oneself. Working with meaning drives people to continue striving for a desirable goal.
Accomplishments or Achievements
are the pursuit of success and mastery. Unlike the other parts of PERMA, they are sometimes pursued even when accomplishments do not result in positive emotions, meaning, or relationships. Accomplishments or achievements can activate other elements of PERMA, such as pride, under positive emotion. These accomplishments and achievements can be individual or community-based, fun-based, or work-based.

Each of the five PERMA elements was selected according to three criteria:

1. It contributes to well-being.
2. It is pursued for its own sake.
3. It is defined and measured independently of the other elements.

=== Character Strengths and Virtues ===
The Character Strengths and Virtues (CSV) handbook (2004) was the first attempt by Seligman and Peterson to identify and classify positive psychological traits of human beings. Much like the Diagnostic and Statistical Manual of Mental Disorders (DSM) of general psychology, the CSV provided a theoretical framework to assist in understanding strengths and virtues and for developing practical applications for positive psychology. It identified six classes of virtues (i.e., "core virtues"), underlying 24 measurable character strengths.

The CSV suggested these six virtues have a historical basis in the vast majority of cultures and that they can lead to increased happiness when built upon. Notwithstanding numerous cautions and caveats, this suggestion of universality leads to three theories:

1. The study of positive human qualities broadens the scope of psychological research to include mental wellness.
2. The leaders of the positive psychology movement challenge moral relativism by suggesting people are "evolutionarily predisposed" toward certain virtues.
3. Virtue has a biological basis.

The organization of the six virtues and 24 strengths is as follows:

1. Wisdom and knowledge: creativity, curiosity, open-mindedness, love of learning, perspective, innovation, prudence
2. Courage: bravery, persistence, vitality, zest
3. Humanity: love, kindness, social intelligence
4. Justice: citizenship, fairness, leadership, integrity, excellence
5. Temperance: forgiveness and mercy, humility, self-control
6. Transcendence: appreciation of beauty, gratitude, hope, humor, spirituality

Subsequent research challenged the need for six virtues. Instead, researchers suggested the 24 strengths are more accurately grouped into just three or four categories: Intellectual Strengths, Interpersonal Strengths, and Temperance Strengths, or alternatively, Interpersonal Strengths, Fortitude, Vitality, and Cautiousness. These strengths, and their classifications, have emerged independently elsewhere in literature on values. Paul Thagard described some examples.

=== Flow ===
Mental state in terms of challenge level and skill level, according to Csikszentmihalyi's flow model

In the 1970s, Csikszentmihalyi began studying flow, a state of absorption in which one's abilities are well-matched to the demands at-hand. He often refers to it as "optimal experience". Flow is characterized by intense concentration, loss of self-awareness, a feeling of being perfectly challenged (neither bored nor overwhelmed), and a sense that "time is flying." Flow is intrinsically rewarding; it can also assist in the achievement of goals (e.g., winning a game) or improving skills (e.g., becoming a better chess player). Anyone can experience flow and it can be felt in different domains, such as play, creativity, and work.

Flow is achieved when the challenge of the situation meets one's personal abilities. A mismatch of challenge for someone of low skills results in a state of anxiety and feeling overwhelmed; insufficient challenge for someone highly skilled results in boredom. A good example of this would be an adult reading a children's book. They would not feel challenged enough to be engaged or motivated in the reading. Csikszentmihalyi explained this using various combinations of challenge and skills to predict psychological states. These four states included the following:

Apathy
low challenge and low skill(s)
Relaxation
low challenge and high skill(s)
Anxiety
high challenge and low skill(s)
Flow
high challenge and high skill(s)

Accordingly, an adult reading a children's book would most likely be in the relaxation state. The adult has no need to worry that the task will be more than they can handle. Challenge is a well-founded explanation for how one enters the flow state and employs intense concentration. However, other factors contribute. For example, one must be intrinsically motivated to participate in the activity or challenge. If the person is not interested in the task, then there is no possibility of their being absorbed into the flow state.

==== Benefits ====
Flow can help in parenting children. When parents and children experience flow together it creates a positive experience for both the children and parents. Parents and children can be in a flow together when they are doing activities with each other such as dancing and singing, doing arts and crafts with each other, and overall just playing together. In parenting flow is a state when a parent is fully concentrated on their children and are fully engaged with them, they could lose track of time and they are more focused and controlled.

Flow also has benefits in a school setting. When students are in a state of flow they are fully engaged, leading to better retention of information. Students who experience flow have a more enjoyable and rewarding experience. This state can also reduce stress, which helps with students' mental health and well-being. This increases resilience and helps students to overcome challenges or setbacks by teaching them a growth mindset.

Most teachers and parents want students become more engaged and interested in the classroom. The design of the education system was not able to account for such needs. One school implemented a program called PASS. They acknowledged that students needed more challenge and individual advancement; they referred to this as sport culture. This PASS program integrated an elective class into which students could immerse themselves. Such activities included self-paced learning, mastery-based learning, performance learning, and so on.

Flow benefits general well-being. It is a positive and intrinsically motivating experience. It is known to "produce intense feelings of enjoyment". It can improve our lives by making them happier and more meaningful. Csikszentmihalyi discovered that our personal growth and development generates happiness. Flow is positive experience because it promotes that opportunity for personal development.

==== Negatives ====
Although flow can be helpful to students, it can also cause them to become too focused on one specific thing, and neglect other important aspects and areas of their learning.

In positive psychology, people still question the definition of what constitutes "positive". For example, being optimistic can be seen as a valuable trait; however, in certain contexts, it can also lead to poor health outcomes or risky decision-making . There are other emotions that can be labeled as "negative", for example, anxiety. Anxiety could cause someone to become more mindful and stable, so they are able to adapt to situations, and as a result can be seen as a positive. A second wave of positive psychology has further identified and characterized "positive" and "negative" complexes through the use of critical and dialectical thinking. Researchers in 2016 chose to identify these characteristics via two complexes: post-traumatic growth and love as well as optimism vs. pessimism.

=== Second-wave positive psychology ===
Paul Wong introduced the idea of a second wave of positive psychology, focused on the pursuit of meaning in life, which he contrasted with the pursuit of happiness in life. Ivtzan, Lomas, Hefferon, and Worth have recast positive psychology as being about positive outcome or positive mental health, and have explored the positive outcomes of embracing negative emotions and pessimism. Second-wave positive psychology proposes that it is better to accept and transform the meaning of suffering than it is to avoid suffering.

In 2016, Lomas and Itzvan proposed that human flourishing (their goal for positive psychology) is about embracing dialectic interplay of positive and negative. Phenomena cannot be determined to be positive or negative independent of context. Some of their examples included:

The dialectic of optimism and pessimism
Optimism is associated with longevity, but strategic pessimism can lead to more effective planning and decision making. While optimism is viewed as essential to well-being, Seligman notes dangers of becoming overoptimistic. Total pessimism is different from pessimism that results in problem solving and anticipatory fault identification which may result in positive outcomes.
The dialectic of self-esteem and humility
Higher levels of self-esteem are associated with increased well-being, but pursuit of self-esteem can also increase depression. One study found that adolescence who had lower self-esteem were more likely to have poorer mental health outcomes in adulthood. Humility, however, is not the lack of self-esteem, as a balance of self-acceptance and selflessness is possible.
The dialectic of forgiveness and anger
Forgiveness has been associated with well-being, as it is often beneficial for both the offender and the victim. However, forgiveness of behaviors that are extreme, such as abuse, may result on an ongoing pattern of negative behavior. Anger is often viewed as a negative emotion, yet there are times that anger is more appropriate than forgiveness in one's overall well-being. While anger is not always appropriate, acceptable, or justified, there are times anger results in positive outcomes and increased well-being.

In 2019, Wong proposed four principles of second-wave positive psychology:

1. accepting and confronting with courage the reality that life is full of evil and suffering
2. sustainable wellbeing can only be achieved through overcoming suffering and the dark side of life
3. recognizing that everything in life comes in polarities and the importance of achieving an adaptive balance through dialectics
4. learning from indigenous psychology, such as the ancient wisdom of finding deep joy in bad situations

Second-wave positive psychology is sometimes abbreviated as PP 2.0.

=== Third-wave positive psychology ===
The third wave of positive psychology emphasizes going beyond the individual to take a deeper look at the groups and systems in which we live. It also promotes becoming more interdisciplinary and multicultural and incorporates more methodologies.

In broadening the scope and exploring the systemic and socio-cultural dimensions of people's lived realities, there are four specific things to focus on:

1. The focus of enquiry: becoming more interested in emergent paradigms like "systems-informed positive psychology" which incorporates principles and concepts from the systems sciences to optimize human social systems and the individuals within them.
2. Disciplines: becoming more multi- and interdisciplinary, as reflected in hybrid formulations like positive education, which combines traditional education and research based ways of increasing happiness and overall well-being.
3. Cultural contexts: becoming more multicultural and global.
4. Methodologies: embracing other paradigms and ways of knowing, such as qualitative and mixed methods approaches rather than relying solely on quantitative research.

== Research and evidence ==
Subject-matter and methodology development expanded the field of positive psychology beyond its core theories and methods. Positive psychology is now a global area of study, with various national indices tracking citizens' happiness ratings.

=== Research findings ===
Research in positive psychology, well-being, eudaimonia and happiness, and the theories of Diener, Ryff, Keyes, and Seligman cover a broad range of topics including "the biological, personal, relational, institutional, cultural, and global dimensions of life."

A meta-analysis of 49 studies showed that Positive Psychology Interventions (PPI) produced improvements in well-being and lower depression levels; the PPIs studied included writing gratitude letters, learning optimistic thinking, replaying positive life experiences, and socializing with others. In a later meta-analysis of 39 studies with 6,139 participants, the outcomes were positive. Three to six months after a PPI the effects on subjective well-being and psychological well-being were still significant. However the positive effect was weaker than in the earlier meta-analysis; the authors concluded that this was because they only used higher-quality studies. The PPIs they considered included counting blessings, kindness practices, making personal goals, showing gratitude, and focusing on personal strengths. Another review of PPIs found that over 78% of intervention studies were conducted in Western countries.

In the textbook Positive Psychology: The Science of Happiness, authors Compton and Hoffman give the "Top Down Predictors" of well-being as high self esteem, optimism, self efficacy, a sense of meaning in life, and positive relationships with others. The personality traits most associated with well-being are extraversion, agreeability, and low levels of neuroticism.

In a study published in 2020, students were enrolled in a positive psychology course that focused on improving happiness and well-being through teaching about positive psychology. The participants answered questions pertaining to the five PERMA categories. At the end of the semester those same students reported significantly higher scores in all categories (p<.001) except for engagement which was significant at p<.05. The authors stated, "Not only do students learn and get credit, there is also a good chance that many will reap the benefits in what is most important to them—their health, happiness, and well-being."

A 2025 study further examined the role of positive psychology courses for undergraduate students. This study evaluated the impact of a positive psychology course for 38 students compared to a control group. Findings identified statistically significant benefits relating to physical health, measures of well-being, and mental health for the group who received the course compared to the control group. While further studies are needed to examine the impact of positive psychology courses, the evidence is promising.

A systematic review was conducted to explore the impact of positive psychology interventions on breast cancer patients' mental and physical well-being. The review analyzed multiple studies that examined interventions such as mindfulness, gratitude practices, and strengths-based approaches in improving quality of life for those diagnosed with breast cancer. Results consistently demonstrated that these interventions significantly reduced symptoms of anxiety, depression, and stress, while fostering resilience, optimism, and emotional well-being. Furthermore, positive psychology approaches were found to enhance patients' adherence to treatment and improve their ability to cope with the challenges of illness and recovery. This review highlights the growing evidence for incorporating positive psychology into breast cancer care, underscoring its potential to support both mental health and holistic recovery in patients.

A systematic review and meta-analysis was conducted using various positive psychology techniques to enhance the well-being of individuals with psychiatric and somatic disorders, including breast cancer patients. Key methods included mindfulness-based interventions, gratitude exercises, and strength identification, which aimed to build emotional resilience. Additionally, practices like savoring, cognitive reappraisal, and self-compassion were employed to foster positive emotions and coping strategies. These interventions significantly contributed to reducing distress and promoting overall psychological health by encouraging patients to focus on positive aspects of life despite their challenges.

== Academic methods ==
=== Quantitative ===
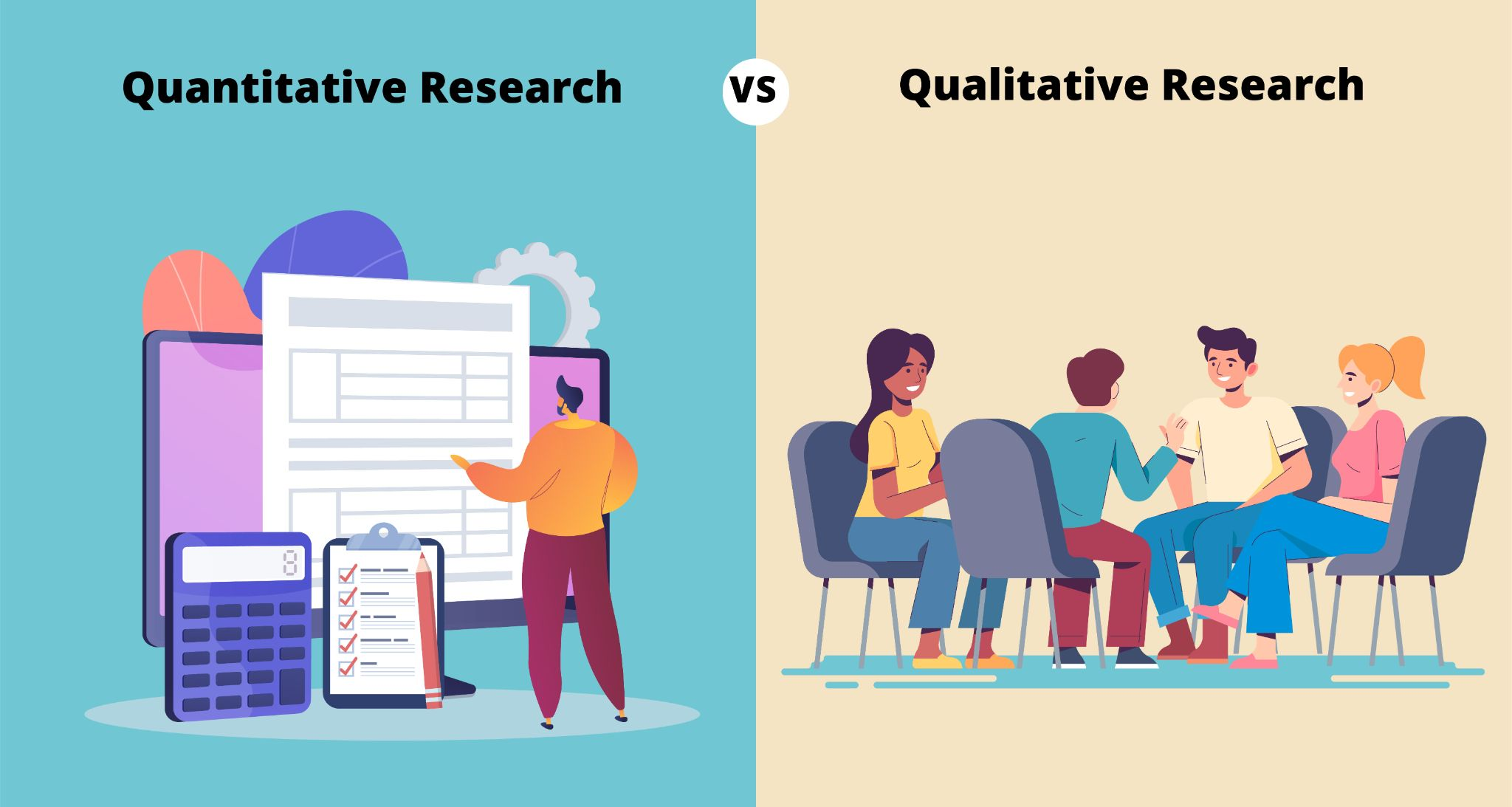
Quantitative data is numbers-based, countable, or measurable. Qualitative data is interpretation-based, descriptive, and relating to language.

Quantitative methods in positive psychology include p-technique factor analysis, dynamic factor analysis, interindividual differences and structural equation modeling, spectral analysis and item response models, dynamic systems analysis, latent growth analysis, latent-class models, hierarchical linear modeling, measurement invariance, experimental methods, behavior genetics, and integration of quantitative and qualitative approaches.

=== Qualitative ===
Grant J. Rich explored the use of qualitative methodology to study positive psychology. Rich addresses the popularity of quantitative methods in studying the empirical questions that positive psychology presents. He argues that there is an "overemphasis" on quantitative methods and suggests implementing qualitative methods, such as semi-structured interviews, observations, fieldwork, creative artwork, and focus groups. Rich states that qualitative approaches will further promote the "flourishing of positive psychology" and encourages such practice.

=== Behavioral interventions ===
Changing happiness levels through interventions is a further methodological advancement in the study of positive psychology, and has been the focus of various academic and scientific psychological publications. Happiness-enhancing interventions include expressing kindness, gratitude, optimism, humility, awe, and mindfulness.

One behavioral experiment used two six-week interventions: one involving the performance of acts of kindness, and one focused on gratitude which emphasized the counting of one's blessings. The study participants who went through the behavioral interventions reported higher levels of happiness and well-being than those who did not participate in either intervention.

Another study found that the interventions of expressing optimism and expressing gratitude enhanced subjective well-being in participants who took part in the intervention for eight months. The researchers concluded that interventions are "most successful when participants know about, endorse, and commit to the intervention." The article provides support that when people enthusiastically take part in behavioral interventions, such as expression of optimism and gratitude, they may increase happiness and subjective well-being.

Another study examined the interaction effects between gratitude and humility through behavior interventions. The interventions were writing a gratitude letter and writing a 14-day diary. In both interventions, the researchers found that gratitude and humility are connected and are "mutually reinforcing." The study also discusses how gratitude, and its associated humility, may lead to more positive emotional states and subjective well-being.

A series of experiments showed a positive effect of awe on subjective well-being. People who felt awe also reported feeling they had more time, more preference for experiential expenditures than material expenditures, and greater life satisfaction. Experiences that heighten awe may lead to higher levels of life satisfaction and, in turn, higher levels of happiness and subjective well-being.

Mindfulness interventions may also increase subjective well-being in people who mindfully meditate. Being mindful in meditation includes awareness and observation of one's meditation practice, with non-reactive and non-judgmental sentiments during meditation.

=== National indices of happiness ===
The creation of various national indices of happiness have expanded the field of positive psychology to a global scale.

In a January 2000 article in American Psychologist, psychologist Ed Diener argued for the creation of a national happiness index in the United States. Such an index could provide measurements of happiness, or subjective well-being, within the United States and across many other countries in the world. Diener argued that national indices would be helpful markers or indicators of population happiness, providing a sense of current ratings and a tracker of happiness across time. Diener proposed that the national index include various sub-measurements of subjective well-being, including "pleasant affect, unpleasant affect, life satisfaction, fulfillment, and more specific states such as stress, affection, trust, and joy."

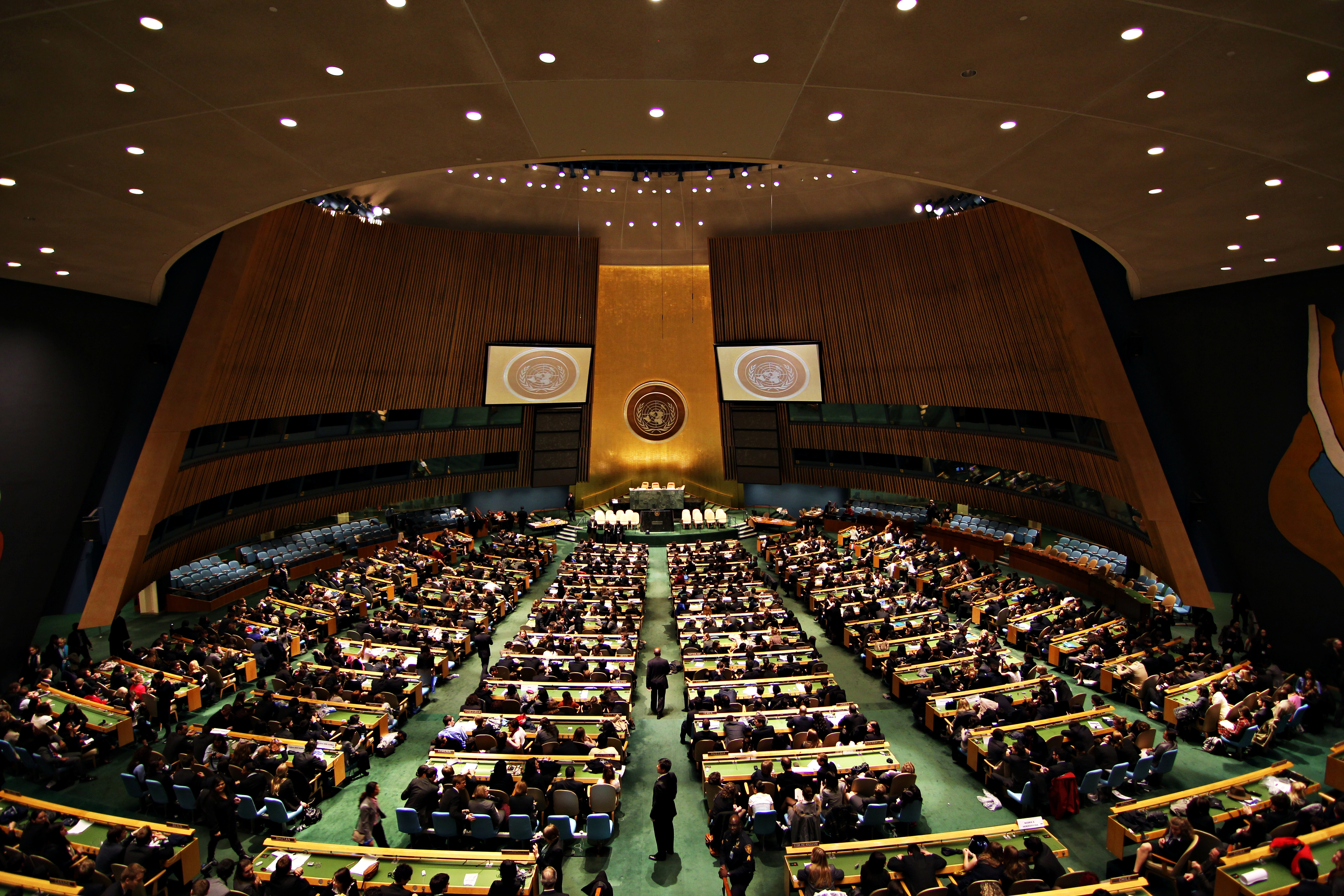
The first World Happiness Report was initiated by the UN General Assembly in June 2011.

In 2012, the first World Happiness Report was published. The World Happiness Report was initiated by the UN General Assembly in June 2011, when it passed the Bhutanese Resolution. The Bhutanese Resolution called for nations across the world to "give more importance to happiness and well-being in determining how to achieve and measure social and economic development." The data for the World Happiness Reports is collected in partnership with the Gallup World Poll's life evaluations and annual happiness rankings. The World Happiness Report bases its national rankings on how happy constituents believe themselves to be.

The first World Happiness Report, published in 2012, detailed the state of world happiness, the causes of happiness and misery, policy implications from happiness reports, and three case studies of subjective well-being for 1) Bhutan and its Gross National Happiness index, 2) the U.K. Office for National Statistics Experience, and 3) happiness in the member countries within the OECD.

The 2020 World Happiness Report, the eighth in the series of reports, was the first to include happiness rankings of cities across the world, in addition to rankings of 156 countries. The city of Helsinki, Finland was reported as the city with the highest subjective well-being ranking, and the country of Finland was reported as the country with the highest subjective well-being ranking. The 2020 report provided insights on happiness based on environmental conditions, social conditions, urban-rural happiness differentials, and sustainable development. It also provided possible explanations for why Nordic countries have consistently ranked in the top ten happiest countries in the World Happiness Report, such as Nordic countries' high-quality government benefits and protections to its citizens, including welfare benefits and well-operated democratic institutions, as well as social connections, bonding, and trust.

Additional national well-being indices and reported statistics include the Gallup Global Emotions Report, Sharecare Community Well-Being Index, Global Happiness Council's Global Happiness and Well-being Policy Report, Happy Planet Index, OECD Better Life Index, and UN Human Development Reports.

== Applications ==
Positive psychology influenced other academic fields of study and scholarship, notably organizational behavior, education, and psychiatry.

Positive psychology has also informed psychotherapy by introducing structured interventions that extend beyond symptom reduction to promote resilience, meaning, and goal attainment. These approaches often use staged exercises, feedback loops, and experiential practices to foster sustainable well-being.

=== Positive organizational scholarship ===
Positive organizational scholarship (POS), also referred to as positive organizational behavior (POB), began as an application of positive psychology to the field of organizational behavior. An early use of the term was in Positive Organizational Scholarship: Foundations of a New Discipline (2003), edited by Ross School of Business professors Kim S. Cameron, Jane E. Dutton, and Robert E. Quinn. The editors promote "the best of the human condition", such as goodness, compassion, resilience, and positive human potential, as an organizational goal as important as financial success. The goal of POS is to study the factors that create positive work experiences and successful, people-oriented outcomes.

The 2011 volume The Oxford Handbook of Positive Organizational Scholarship, covers such topics as positive human resource practices, positive organizational practices, and positive leadership and change. It applies positive psychology to the workplace context, covering areas such as positive individual attributes, positive emotions, strengths and virtues, and positive relationships. The editors of that volume define POS this way:

Positive organizational scholarship rigorously seeks to understand what represents the best of the human condition based on scholarly research and theory. Just as positive psychology focuses on exploring optimal individual psychological states rather than pathological ones, organizational scholarship focuses attention on the generative dynamics in organizations that lead to the development of human strength, foster resiliency in employees, enable healing and restoration, and cultivate extraordinary individual and organizational performance. POS emphasizes what elevates individuals and organizations (in addition to what challenges them), what goes right in organizations (in addition to what goes wrong), what is life-giving (in addition to what is problematic or life-depleting), what is experienced as good (in addition to what is objectionable), and what is inspiring (in addition to what is difficult or arduous).

In organizational settings, positive psychology interventions have been used to improve employee engagement, foster resilience, and promote job satisfaction. These applications aim to build on employees' strengths, enhance meaning at work, and create a more fulfilling workplace environment.

Positive psychology has been incorporated into a range of professional, clinical, empirical, and academic settings. In education, programs based on positive psychology principles have been used to study student engagement, resilience, and academic performance. Research has found that imbedding positive psychology in undergraduate education may improve various areas including physical health outcomes. Within workplaces, some organizations have implemented approaches that emphasize employee strengths and optimistic thinking, and research has examined links to job satisfaction, productivity, and burnout. Research with healthcare professionals found that applying positive psychology in programs for healthcare workers encourages a reduction in stress and strengthens their sense of purpose. In clinical contexts, certain practitioners have integrated positive psychology concepts alongside traditional methods, with studies exploring potential effects on resilience and overall well-being among individuals with mental health challenges. In a study of cancer patients, findings show that positive psychological interventions can improve overall well-being while reducing psychological distress.These examples reflect the broader use of positive psychology in multiple areas, as researchers continue to examine its practical applications and limitations.

=== Psychiatry ===
Positive psychology influenced psychiatry and led to more widespread promotion of practices including well-being therapy, positive psychotherapy, and an integration of positive psychology in therapeutic practice.

Benefits of positive influences can be seen in practices like positive psychological interventions (PPIs). It is an intervention designed to promote positive outcomes by implying positive activities such as imposing adaptive personality traits to be praised and encouraged. Research has found that PPIs has the potential to improve medical and psychiatric disorders of individuals with depression and suicidal levels. Department of Developmental Services (DDS) did a research on a 52-year-old single gay man with bipolar II disorder and attention deficit hyperactive disorder (ADHD) with low self-esteem. In addition, there were other focuses of this research: promoting kindness behavior, identifying, and encouraging internal strengths to reach a fulfilling life.

Psychoanalysis can be used to treat mental illnesses such as depression as it focuses on identifying the conscious and unconscious motivations and behaviors affecting one's life. Treatment using psychoanalysis runs in a longer duration by practicing free association to promote personal growth. Cognitive behavioral therapy (CBT), a common type of psychotherapy, focuses on both psychoanalysis and behavioral analysis: psychoanalysts focusing on conscious and unconscious motivations, behaviorists focusing on objectively measured behaviors. Therapy such as exposure therapy helps people with specific aspects of depression, or more specific cases like social phobia.

Positive psychology may assist those recovering from traumatic brain injury (TBI). TBI rehabilitation practices rely on bettering the patient's life by getting them to engage (or re-engage) in normal everyday practices, an idea which is related to tenets of positive psychology. While the empirical evidence for positive psychology is limited, positive psychology's focus on small successes, optimism, and prosocial behavior promises to improve the social and emotional well-being of TBI patients.

=== Media and industry ===
Positive psychology is a subject of popular books and films, and influences the wellness industry.

==== Books ====
Several popular psychology books have been written for a general audience.

Ilona Boniwell's Positive Psychology in a Nutshell provided a summary of the research. According to Boniwell, well-being is related to optimism, extraversion, social connections (i.e., close friendships), being married, having engaging work, religion or spirituality, leisure, good sleep and exercise, social class (through lifestyle differences and better coping methods), and subjective health (what you think about your health). Boniwell writes that well-being is not related to age, physical attractiveness, money (once basic needs are met), gender (women are more often depressed but also more often joyful), educational level, having children, moving to a sunnier climate, crime prevention, housing, and objective health (what doctors say).

Sonja Lyubomirsky's The How of Happiness provides advice on how to improve happiness. According to this book, people should create new habits, seek out new emotions, use variety and timing to prevent hedonic adaptation, and enlist others to support the creation of those new habits. Lyubomirsky recommends twelve happiness activities, including savoring life, learning to forgive, and living in the present.

Stumbling on Happiness by Daniel Gilbert shares positive psychology research suggesting that people are often poor at predicting what will make them happy and that people are prone to misevaluating the causes of their happiness. He notes that the subjectivity of well-being and happiness often is the most difficult challenge to overcome in predicting future happiness, as our future selves may have different perspectives on life than our current selves.

==== Films ====
The film industry noticed positive psychology, and films have spurred new research within positive psychology.

Happy is a full-length documentary film covering positive psychology and neuroscience. It highlights case studies on happiness across diverse cultures and geographies. The film features interviews with notable positive psychologists and scholars, including Gilbert, Diener, Lyubomirsky, and Csikszentmihalyi.

The VIA Institute has researched positive psychology as represented in feature films. Contemporary and popular films that promote or represent character strengths are the basis for various academic articles.

In Positive Psychology at the Movies, Ryan Niemiec and Danny Wedding explore how mainstream films—ranging from Groundhog Day to The Pursuit of Happyness—illustrate character strengths, hope, and personal growth.

==== Wellness industry ====
The growing popularity and attention given to positive psychology research has influenced industry growth, development, and consumption of products and services meant to cater to wellness and well-being.

According to the Global Wellness Institute, as of 2023, the global wellness economy is valued at US$6.3 trillion; the key sectors of the industry included Nutrition, Personal Care and Beauty, and Physical activity, while the Mental wellness and Public health sectors accounted for approximately US$1 billion.

== Criticism and limitations ==
Many aspects of positive psychology have been criticized.

It has been suggested that positive psychology suffers from a persistent failure to properly acknowledge extensive prior work on optimal human functioning.

=== Reality distortion ===
==== Positive illusions ====
In 1988, psychologists Shelley E. Taylor and Jonathan D. Brown co-authored a Psychological Bulletin article that coined the phrase positive illusions. Positive illusions are the cognitive processes people engage in when they self-aggrandize or self-enhance. They are unrealistically positive or self-affirming attitudes that individuals hold about themselves, their position, or their environment. They are attitudes of extreme optimism that endure in the face of facts and real conditions.

Taylor and Brown suggest that positive illusions protect people from negative feedback that they might receive, and this, in turn, preserves their psychological adaptation and subjective well-being. However, later research found that positive illusions and related attitudes lead to psychological maladaptive conditions such as poorer social relationships, expressions of narcissism, and negative workplace outcomes, thus reducing the positive effects that positive illusions have on subjective well-being, overall happiness, and life satisfaction.

Kirk J. Schneider, editor of the Journal of Humanistic Psychology, pointed to research showing high positivity correlates with positive illusion, which distorts reality. High positivity or flourishing could make one incapable of psychological growth, unable to self-reflect, and prone to holding racial biases. By contrast, negativity, sometimes evidenced in mild to moderate depression, is correlated with less distortion of reality. Therefore, Schneider argues, negativity might play an important role: engaging in conflict and acknowledging appropriate negativity, including certain negative emotions like guilt, might better promote flourishing. Schneider wrote: "perhaps genuine happiness is not something you aim at, but is... a by-product of a life well lived—and a life well lived does not settle on the programmed or neatly calibrated."

==== Role of negativity ====
Barbara S. Held, a professor at Bowdoin College, argues that positive psychology has faults: negative side effects, negativity within the positive psychology movement, and the division in the field of psychology caused by differing opinions of psychologists on positive psychology. She notes the movement's lack of consistency regarding the role of negativity. She also raises issues with the simplistic approach taken by some psychologists in the application of positive psychology. A "one size fits all" approach is arguably not beneficial; she suggests a need for individual differences to be incorporated into its application. By teaching young people that being confident and optimistic leads to success, when they are unsuccessful they may believe this is because they are insecure or pessimistic. This could lead them to believe that any negative internal thought or feeling they may experience is damaging to their happiness and should be steered clear of completely.

Held prefers the Second Wave Positive Psychology message of embracing the dialectic nature of positive and negative, and questions the need to call it "positive" psychology.

==== Toxic positivity ====
Though the concept of unrealistic optimism had already been explored by psychologists at least as early as 1980, the term toxic positivity appeared in J. Halberstam's 2011 The Queer Art of Failure ("...to poke holes in the toxic positivity of contemporary life"). Beginning in about 2019, the term toxic positivity became the subject of a greater number of Internet searches.

One critical response to positive psychology concerns "toxic positivity". Toxic positivity is when people do not fully acknowledge, process, or manage the entire spectrum of human emotion, including anger and sadness. This genre of criticism argues that positive psychology places too much importance on "upbeat thinking, while shunting challenging and difficult experiences to the side." People who engage in a constant chase for positive experiences or states of high subjective well-being may inadvertently stigmatize negative emotional conditions such as depression, or may suppress natural emotional responses, such as sadness, regret, or stress. Furthermore, by not allowing negative emotional states to be experienced, or by suppressing and hiding negative emotional responses, people may experience harmful physical, cardiovascular, and respiratory consequences. Opponents of toxic positivity advocate accepting and fully experiencing negative emotional states.

=== Methodological and philosophical critiques ===
Richard Lazarus critiqued positive psychology's methodological and philosophical components. He held that giving more detail and insight into the positive is not bad, but not at the expense of the negative, because the two (positive and negative) are inseparable. Among his critiques:

1. Positive psychology's use of correlational and cross-sectional research designs to indicate causality between the movement's ideas and healthy lives may hide other factors and time differences that account for observed differences.
2. Emotions cannot be categorized dichotomously into positive and negative; emotions are subjective and rich in social/relational meaning. Emotions are fluid, meaning that the context they appear in changes over time. Lazarus states that "all emotions have the potential of being either one or the other, or both, on different occasions, and even on the same occasion when an emotion is experienced by different persons"
3. Individual differences are neglected in most social science research. Many research designs focus on the statistical significance of the groups while overlooking differences among people.
4. Social science researchers tend not to adequately define and measure emotions. Most assessments are quick checklists and do not provide adequate debriefing. Many researchers do not differentiate between fluid emotional states and relatively stable personality traits.

Lazarus held that positive psychology claims to be new and innovative, but much of the research on stress and coping theory makes many of the same claims as positive psychology. The movement attempts to uplift and reinforce the positive aspects of one's life, but everyone in life experiences stress and hardship. Coping with these events should not be seen as adapting to failure, but rather as successfully navigating stress, a perspective that the movement does not fully embrace.

Another critique of positive psychology is that it has been developed from a Eurocentric worldview. Intersectionality has become a methodological concern regarding studies within positive psychology. A literature review conducted in 2022 noted several criticisms of the area, including a lack of conceptual thinking, problematic measurements, poor replication of results, self-isolation from mainstream psychology, decontextualization, and being used for capitalism.

=== Narrow focus ===
In 2003, Ian Sample noted that "Positive psychologists also stand accused of burying their heads in the sand and ignoring that depressed, even merely unhappy people, have real problems that need dealing with." He quoted Steven Wolin, a clinical psychiatrist at George Washington University, as saying that the study of positive psychology is just a reiteration of older ways of thinking, and that there is not much scientific research to support the efficacy of this method.

Psychological researcher Shelly Gable retorts that positive psychology is just bringing a balance to a side of psychology that is glaringly understudied. She points to imbalances favoring research into negative psychological well-being in cognitive psychology, health psychology, and social psychology.

Psychologist Jack Martin maintains that positive psychology is not unique in its optimistic approach to emotional well-being, stating that other forms of psychology, such as counseling and educational psychology, are also interested in positive human fulfillment. He says while positive psychology pushes for schools to be more student-centered and able to foster positive self-images in children, a lack of focus on self-control may prevent children from making full contributions to society. If positive psychology is not implemented correctly, it can cause more harm than good. This is the case, for example, when interventions in school are coercive (in the sense of being imposed on everyone without regard for the child's reasons for negativity) and fail to take each student's context into account.

=== Applications and misapplications ===
==== The US Army's Comprehensive Soldier Fitness program ====
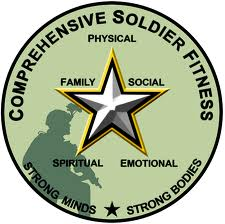
In contract with Seligman's Positive Psychology Center at the University of Pennsylvania, the United States Army began the Comprehensive Soldier Fitness program in order to address psychological issues among soldiers.

The Comprehensive Soldier Fitness (CSF) program was established in 2008 by then-Chief of Staff of the United States Army, General George W. Casey, Jr., in an effort to address increasing rates of drug abuse, family violence, PTSD, and suicide among soldiers. The Army contracted with Seligman's Positive Psychology Center at the University of Pennsylvania to supply a program based on the center's Penn Resiliency Program, which was designed for 10- to 14-year-old children. Although Seligman proposed starting with a small-scale pilot test, General Casey insisted on immediately rolling out the CSF to the entire Army. Interviewed for the journal Monitor on Psychology of the American Psychological Association, Seligman said that "This is the largest study—1.1 million soldiers—psychology has ever been involved in." According to journalist Jesse Singal, "It would become one of the largest mental-health interventions geared at a single population in the history of humanity, and possibly the most expensive."

Some psychologists criticized the CSF for various reasons. Nicholas J.L. Brown wrote: "The idea that techniques that have demonstrated, at best, marginal effects in reducing depressive symptoms in school-age children could also prevent the onset of a condition that is associated with some of the most extreme situations with which humans can be confronted is a remarkable one that does not seem to be backed up by empirical evidence." Stephen Soldz of the Boston Graduate School of Psychoanalysis cited Seligman's acknowledgment that the CSF is a gigantic study rather than a program based on proven techniques, and questioned the ethics of requiring soldiers to participate in research without informed consent. Soldz also criticized the CSF training for trying to build up-beat attitudes toward combat: "Might soldiers who have been trained to resiliently view combat as a growth opportunity be more likely to ignore or under-estimate real dangers, thereby placing themselves, their comrades, or civilians at heightened risk of harm?"

In 2021, the Chronicle of Higher Education carried a debate between Singal and Seligman about whether, with the CSF well into its second decade, there was any solid evidence of its effectiveness. Singal cited studies that, he said, failed to find any measurable benefits from such positive psychology techniques, and he criticized the Army's own reports as methodologically unsound and lacking peer review. Seligman said that Singal had misinterpreted the studies and ignored the Army's positive feedback from soldiers, one of whom told Seligman that "if I had had this training years ago, it would have saved my marriage."

=== Equality gaps and underrepresentation ===
==== Demographic diversity ====
Positive psychology has historically been critiqued for its lack of demographic diversity, both in terms of its research populations and its theoretical frameworks. Much of the early research in positive psychology was conducted predominantly with Western, educated, industrialized, rich, and democratic (WEIRD) populations, leading to concerns about the generalizability of its findings across different demographic groups. Recent studies have highlighted the need for more inclusive research that encompasses a broader range of cultural and socioeconomic backgrounds to ensure that positive psychology interventions are applicable and effective for diverse populations.

==== Cultural sensitivity ====
The concept of cultural sensitivity is crucial for positive psychology, yet it has faced criticism for insufficient consideration of cultural contexts. Positive psychology's principles, such as subjective well-being and character strengths, may not universally apply or be valued equally across all cultures. For instance, in collectivist cultures, individuals prioritize collective well-being over individual happiness, and thus, frameworks like the PERMA model may need adaptation to reflect these values. Additionally, there is a call for more cross-cultural research to validate the applicability of positive psychology interventions globally and to integrate culturally relevant practices and perspectives.

==== Accessibility ====
Accessibility issues are a significant concern within positive psychology. Interventions and practices derived from positive psychology may not be equally accessible to all populations, particularly those from marginalized or lower socioeconomic backgrounds. There is evidence that socioeconomic factors can impact the effectiveness and availability of positive psychology interventions, potentially exacerbating existing inequalities. To address these gaps, there is a growing emphasis on developing and implementing positive psychology practices that are affordable and accessible to diverse communities, including those with limited resources.

== Future directions ==
Cross-cultural research is essential to explore how positive psychology practices perform across different cultural settings and to refine interventions for global application. Some researchers have written that addressing criticisms related to methodological rigor, theoretical clarity, and practical applicability should be a priority, with a focus on enhancing the robustness of positive psychology research methodologies, improving the replicability of findings, and addressing the critiques related to the movement's focus and applicability.

== See also ==
- Unconditional positive regard

Precursors

- New Thought – 19th-century American spiritual movement
- Maslow's hierarchy of needs – Theory of developmental psychology
- Needs and Motives (Henry Murray)
- Self-determination theory – Macro theory of human motivation and personality

Various

- Anatomy of an Epidemic – Work by Robert Whitaker
- Aversion to happiness
- Louise Burfitt-Dons
- Community psychology – Branch of psychology
- Culture and positive psychology
- Happiness economics – Study of happiness and quality of life
- Meaning of life – Philosophical and spiritual question
- Pollyanna principle – Tendency to remember pleasant things better
- Positive education
- Positive neuroscience
- Positive psychotherapy – Psychotherapeutic method developed by Nossrat Peseschkian
- Positive youth development – Type of youth development program
- Posttraumatic growth – Psychological term
- Pragmatism – Philosophical tradition
- Psychological resilience – Ability to mentally cope with a crisis
- Rational ignorance – Practice of avoiding research whose cost exceeds its benefits
- Second wave positive psychology – Psychological approach
- Sex-positive movement – Ideology supporting healthy sexual norms
- Theory of humor – Conjectures explaining humor
