= Second-wave positive psychology =

Psychological approach

Second-wave positive psychology (PP 2.0) is a therapeutic approach in psychology that attempts to bring out the best in individuals and society by incorporating the dark side of human existence through the dialectical principles of yin and yang. This represents a distinct shift from focusing on individual happiness and success to the dual vision of individual well-being and collective humanity. PP 2.0 is more about bringing out the "better angels of our nature" than achieving optimal happiness or personal success. The approach posits that empathy, compassion, reason, justice, and self-transcendence will improve humans, both individually and collectively. PP 2.0 centers around the universal human capacity for meaning-seeking and meaning-making in achieving optimal human functioning under both desirable and undesirable conditions. This emerging movement is a response to perceived problems of what some have called "positive psychology as usual".

== Limitations of positive psychology ==
Positive psychology "as usual" has been presented as

the branch of psychology that uses scientific understanding and effective intervention to aid in the achievement of a satisfactory life, rather than treating mental illness. The focus of positive psychology is on personal growth rather than on pathology.

It has been argued that this binary, dichotomous view has fueled positive psychology's success and decline. The single-minded focus on positivity has resulted in persistent backlash (e.g., Frawley, 2015 for a recent review). The following criticisms have been leveled against positive psychology by researchers both outside of and within the positive psychology community. These include the "tyranny" of positivity and the lack of balance between positives and negatives; failing to cover the entire spectrum of human experiences; failing to recognize the importance of contextual variables; and assuming that the Western individualistic culture represents the universal human experience. As a result, various positive psychologists have proposed the need for a broader perspective.

== Existential positive psychology ==
Paul Wong has argued for integrating positive psychology with existential psychology, resulting in "existential positive psychology" (EPP). This approach differs significantly from positive psychology "as usual" regarding epistemology and content.

EPP takes a pluralistic and holistic approach to research. It is open to insights and wisdom from both the East and the West and research findings from all sources regardless of the paradigm of truth claims. In terms of content, it explores both people's existential anxieties and their ultimate concerns. Thus, EPP contributes to a broader understanding of human experiences.

Both existential philosophers and psychologists see life as a series of paradoxes, predicaments, and problems. From this existential perspective, life is also full of striving and sense-making, tragedies, and triumphs. The dynamic interplay between good and evil, negatives and positives, is one of the hallmarks of EPP. Positives cannot exist apart from negatives, and authentic happiness grows from pain and suffering. This paradoxical view reflects Albert Camus' insight that "there is no joy of life without despair" (p. 56) and Rollo May's observation that "the ultimate paradox is that negation becomes affirmation" (p. 164).

It may be argued that positive psychology is intrinsically existential because it is concerned with such fundamental questions about human existence as: What is the good life? What makes life worth living? How can one find happiness? Positive psychology research on these existential issues without taking into account the existential literature inevitably leads to superficiality or mischaracterization.

A comprehensive positive psychology cannot be developed without taking into account the reality of death, the only certainty for all living organisms. However, human beings alone are burdened with the cognitive capacity to be aware of their own mortality and to fear what may follow after one's own demise. However, death awareness may be essential to meaningful living; "though the physicality of death destroys us, the idea of death saves us" (p. 7). Thus, awareness of our finality is indeed an important motivational factor for us to do something meaningful and significant in our lives.

Therefore, EPP advocates that the proper context of studying well-being and the meaningful life is the reality of suffering and death. Researchers who share this view include Bretherton and Ørner, Schneider, and Taheny.

Recently, positive psychologists have recognized that positive psychology is rooted in Humanistic psychology, but in practice, it continues to distance itself from its heritage because of the alleged lack of scientific research in humanistic psychology. A mature positive psychology needs to return to its existential-humanistic roots because it can both broaden and deepen positive psychology.

== Components of PP 2.0 ==
Paul Wong extends EPP to second-wave positive psychology (PP 2.0) by formally incorporating the dialectical principles of Chinese psychology, the bio-behavioral dual-system model of adaptation, and cross-cultural positive psychology. Thus, PP 2.0 provides a big tent that allows for multiple indigenous positive psychologies and a much broader list of variables that contribute to well-being and flourishing.

PP 2.0 is necessary because neither positive psychology nor humanistic-existential psychology can adequately understand such complex human phenomena as meaning, virtue, and happiness. Such deep knowledge can only be achieved by an integrative and collaborative endeavor. This calls for a humble science. In other words, PP 2.0 denies that the positivist paradigm is the only way to examine truth claims, especially when we research the profound questions of what makes life worth living.

=== Assumptions ===
1. Human nature has the potential for both good and evil; thus, self-control of selfish and destructive instincts is necessary to cultivate the "better angels of our nature."
2. Dialectical principles can best integrate positive and negative factors in different contexts.
3. Meaning offers the best protection against adversities and existential concerns and the best pathway to achieve the good life of virtue, happiness, and significance.
4. Just as physical health can only be maintained in recognition of the fact that we live in an environment infected with bacteria and viruses, promoting positive mental health and optimal human functioning must recognize the inevitable dark side of human existence.
5. Individual well-being is connected with the common good of humanity.

=== Mission ===
1. To improve the lives of all people and nurture their potential, regardless of their circumstances and cultural backgrounds.
2. To repair the worst and bring out the best, with a focus on the human potential for growth.
3. To integrate negatives and positives to optimize well-being.
4. To study how global beliefs and values affect people's eudaimonic well-being and human functioning.
5. To minimize or transform the downside of the bright side and optimize or transform the upside of the dark side.
6. To cultivate the capacity for meaning-seeking and meaning-making.
7. To study how death awareness can contribute to personal transformation.
8. To develop objective measures of both short-term and long-term well-being for individuals and society.
9. To enhance well-being throughout the lifespan including, the end-of-life stage.
10. To identify and research a host of variables related to both yin and yang.
11. To contain and transform evil to serve the common good.
12. To cultivate inner goodness and develop valid measures of goodness as an outcome.

=== Importance of dialectical thinking ===
Taoist dialectical thinking permeates every aspect of Chinese psychology. Peng and Nisbett showed that Chinese thinking is dialectical rather than binary. Similarly, Sundararajan documents the dialectical co-existence of positive and negative emotions in Chinese people.

Paul Wong's research has also demonstrated that the wisdom of yin and yang operates in many situations. He has argued that Chinese people can hold external and internal loci of control simultaneously. Therefore, their locus of control beliefs can only be measured by a two-dimensional space with external and internal loci of control as two independent scales. However, dialectic thinking is not unique to Chinese culture. For example, pessimism and optimism can co-exist, resulting in tragic optimism. Death fear and death acceptance can also co-exist, resulting in the multidimensional Death Attitude Profile. Resources and deficits co-exist, as conceptualized in the resource-congruence model. Thus, family can be a resource for effective coping, but intra-family conflict can also be a deficit or stressor.

Wong's dual-systems model of approach and avoidance spells out the mechanisms whereby the good life can be achieved amid adversities, not by accentuating the positive and avoiding the negative, but by embracing the dynamic and dialectic interaction between positive and negative experiences. This general bio-behavioral model is also based on the dialectical principle. Dialectical thinking represents a simple but powerful conceptual framework capable of integrating a great deal of the literature relevant to well-being. Yin represents not only the dark side of life but also the conservative and passive modes of adaptation, such as acceptance, letting go, avoidance, withdrawal, disengagement, doing nothing, and self-transcendence. Yang represents not only the bright side of life but also the energetic and active modes of adaptation, such as goal setting and goal striving, problem-solving and controlling, and expanding and maintaining territories.

Expand the scope of positive psychology to include the complex interplay between positive and negative aspects of life.The dynamic balance between positive and negative forces is mediated through dialectical principles. For instance, Lomas and Ivtzan have identified three ways of restoring and maintaining the balance: (a) the principle of appraisal, (b) the principle of co-valence, and (c) the principle of complementarity.

Similarly, Wong identifies four principles of transforming the dark side: (a) becoming wiser and better through the synthesis of opposites, (b) becoming more balanced and flexible through the co-existence of opposites that complement or moderate each other, (c) becoming more aware and appreciative of the after-effects or contrast effect due to the opponent-process, and (d) becoming more vital and more spiritual through self-transcendence.

Thus, the wisdom of achieving the golden mean or the middle way is through the dialectical interactions between yin and yang. These dialectical principles constitute the foundation of PP 2.0 and ensure that the dark side of life serves the adaptive functions of survival and flourishing.

=== Incorporating the dark side ===
The dark side refers to more than just challenging experiences, thoughts, emotions, and behaviors that trigger discomfort. It also encompasses existential anxieties and the inevitable sufferings in life. Apart from existential concerns, the dark side also refers to our Achilles' heel. From Aristotle to William Shakespeare, literature has always recognized the existence of tragic heroes—powerful and successful individuals who are eventually ruined by their character flaws. As Aristotle said, "A man cannot become a hero until he can see the root of his own downfall." All one's talents, character strengths, and efforts will eventually come to null, with disastrous consequences to oneself and others, when one pays no attention to one's own Achilles heel.

=== Meaning hypothesis ===
Paul Wong proposes that the meaning hypothesis is an overarching conceptual framework for PP 2.0 because it is based on the universal human capacity for meaning-making and meaning-seeking and the vital role meaning plays in human experience and well-being. It hypothesizes that meaning is the best possible end value for the good life and offers the best protection against existential anxieties and adversities.

Figure 1. This is figure contrasts the meaning mindset with the success mindset, as proposed by psychologist Paul T. P. Wong, PhD in his 2012 paper, "What is the meaning mindset?" in the International Journal of Existential Psychology and Psychotherapy, Volume 4, Issue 1.

The meaning hypothesis places more emphasis on a fundamental change in global beliefs, and values than behavioral change. The "meaning mindset" affirms that life has unconditional meaning and it can be found in any situation. Figure 1 presents a schematic presentation of the meaning mindset.

If one chooses the meaning mindset, one can still find meaning and fulfillment even when failing to complete one's life mission. Thus, there is no failure when one pursues a virtuous and noble mission as one's life goal. A perspective shift to the meaning mindset helps eliminate one primary source of human misery related to the striving to achieve material success or worldly fame. Cultivating a meaningful mindset may yield a better payoff than positive psychology exercises of enhancing happiness and character strengths because the perspective shift reorients one's focus away from egotistic pursuits to self-transcendence and altruism, which benefit both the individual and society.

=== Conclusion ===
Science is always self-corrective and progressive. PP 2.0 avoids many of the problems inherent in positive psychology "as usual" and opens up new avenues of research and applications. The future of psychology can benefit from integrating three distinct movements—humanistic-existential psychology, positive psychology, and indigenous psychology.

The 21st century belongs to PP 2.0 because of its ability to integrate various sub-disciplines of mainstream psychology and its humble science approach. PP 2.0 is willing to put aside dogmatic epistemological positions in the service of the greater good, as some have recommended.

Meaning management of the dialectical principles is sensitive to individual and cultural contexts but is, at the same time, also cognizant of the common good of humility and self-transcendence. This big-picture perspective of PP 2.0 avoids many of the excesses associated with the egotistic pursuits of happiness and success in positive psychology, as usual.

== See also ==
- Positive psychology
