= Barbara S. Held =

Psychologist and professor

- Education: Douglass College; University of Nebraska–Lincoln
- Occupations: Barry N. Wish Research Professor of Psychology and Social Studies, Bowdoin College

Barbara S. Held is the Barry N. Wish Research Professor of Psychology and Social Studies Emerita at Bowdoin College in the fields of clinical psychology and theoretical/philosophical psychology. She served as President of the Society for Theoretical and Philosophical Psychology (APA Division 24) from 2008 to 2009, and was recipient of the 2012 Joseph B. Glitter Award from the American Psychological Association recognizing her "scholarly contribution to the philosophical foundations of psychological knowledge."

Held is author of several books including Back to Reality: A Critique of Postmodern Theory in Psychotherapy (1995), Stop Smiling, Start Kvetching: A 5-Step Guide to Creative Complaining (2001), Psychology's Interpretive Turn: The Search for Truth and Agency in Theoretical and Philosophical Psychology (2007). She is co-editor of the volumes Humanity's Dark Side: Evil, Destructive Experience, and Psychotherapy (2013) and Rational Intuition: Philosophical Roots, Scientific Investigations (2015).

== Education ==
Held received her A.B. degree from Douglass College and her Ph.D. in clinical psychology from the University of Nebraska–Lincoln.

== Research ==
Held's body of work reflects at least three related lines of inquiry, which have evolved over the course of her career. Her best-known work relates to her philosophical analysis and trenchant critiques of the positive psychology movement. Articles such as "The Negative Side of Positive Psychology" (2004) point out a number of different ways to conceptualize "negative" and "positive" behavior and attitudes from the standpoint of psychology, and suggest that the way positive psychology frames these concepts is potentially problematic and even oppressive.

Her earliest line of research, beginning in the mid-1980s, applied an epistemological framework in evaluating the basis for constructivist family therapy approaches. This eventually developed into a formal inquiry about the philosophical underpinnings of the postmodern psychotherapy movement. Held's more recent work has broadened this lens beyond psychotherapy to encompass the field of psychology as a whole, including attendant philosophy-of-science issues. In Psychology's Interpretive Turn (2007), she examined—and at times criticized—recent efforts by theoretical psychologists to balance the shortcomings of both postmodern and overly positivist, scientistic accounts of human nature with so-called "middle-ground" theories designed to preserve aspects of both.

== Representative publications ==
- Held, B. S., & Pols, E. (1985). The confusion about epistemology and “epistemology”—and what to do about it. Family Process, 24(4), 509–517.
- Held, B. S. (1998). The many truths of postmodernist discourse. Journal of Theoretical and Philosophical Psychology, 18(2), 193–217.
- Held, B. S. (1990). What's in a name? Some confusions and concerns about constructivism. Journal of Marital and Family Therapy, 16(2), 179–186.
- Held, B. S. (2002). The tyranny of the positive attitude in America: Observation and speculation. Journal of Clinical Psychology, 58(9), 965–991.
- Held, B. S. (2004). The negative side of positive psychology. Journal of Humanistic Psychology, 44(1), 9-46.
