= Relational goods =

Relational goods are non-material goods that can only be produced and consumed within groups, and which are intrinsically linked to relationships and interaction. Popular examples include the enjoyment of a football game in a stadium, where the collective enjoyment of the game adds a relational good in terms of excitement and enjoyment to all in the stadium. This constitutes an experience that cannot be had when watching alone. Other examples include group charity work, friendship or reciprocal love. Relational goods can be necessary for the optimization of an activity like the football game example. On the other hand, a relational good may be the relationship in itself, with the good being dependent on the existence of the relationship. Friendships is an example of a relationship in which the value that comes from the relationship is tied up in the existence and maintenance of the relationship.

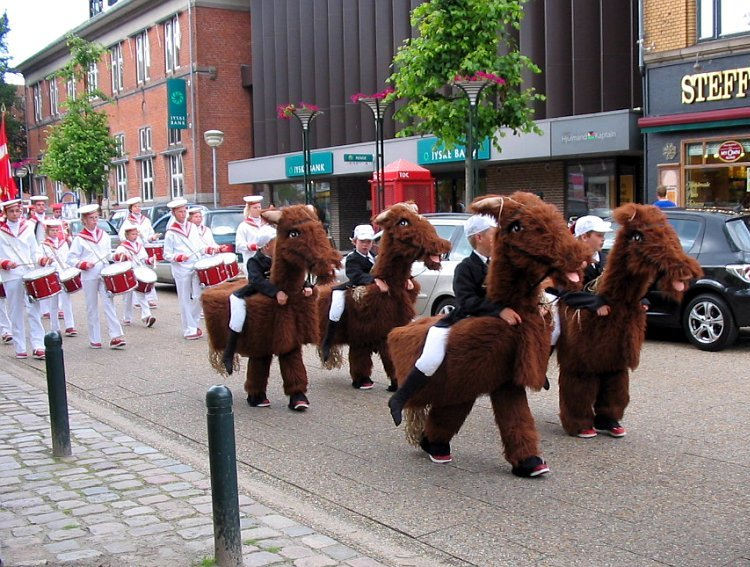
This parade is an example of a relational good as the participants and the spectators both must engage in order for the experience to be successful.

The essential point tends to consider relational goods as goods that are produced and consumed simultaneously by those interacting in the relationship.

== Background ==
Adam Smith, in his 1759 work The Theory of Moral Sentiments, first outlined the idea of non-instrumental relational positives. The 18th century Italian tradition of Civil Economy put the concept of the inner relational nature of the person at the core of the economic science. The idea was largely abandoned until the 1970s by the mainstream (although we can find intuitions in Mill, Marshall, the Austrian school, Keynes, Hirschman), when the discussion of happiness again came to light with the first analysis of the Easterlin Paradox. A solid concept of relational goods was built in the following years in an attempt to reconcile this paradox, and to answer the issue of why voter turnout is higher than rational choice theory suggests. Thus relational goods as an economic concept became more researched in the late 1980s when economists Benedetto Gui wrote From Transactions to Encounters: The Joint Generation of Relational Goods and Conventional Values (1987), and Carole Uhlaner penned Relational Goods and Participation: Incorporating Sociality into a Theory of Rational Action (1989). They aimed to change the way economist think of relationships, and viewed them as non-instrumental goods that have value within themselves.

This idea was adopted from other fields that understood human interaction as a fundamental part of human life, with social deprivation being incredibly harmful to human well-being. Economists adopted this concepts, and began to involve relational analysis to study what creates happiness for individuals.

While commodities may be exchanged or consumed during an encounter, it is the utility that comes from the encounter specifically, rather than the utility of the goods consumed, that is considered a relational good. A shopkeeper may sell a good to a customer, but the relational good in that instance is the interaction, the potential enjoyment, sharing and emotional connection that is swapped which is relevant. Due to the highly intangible nature of this connection, relational goods and their value is difficult to measure, and thus study. Many studies instead measure social interactions (volunteering, clubs, church events, parties and gatherings etc.) against self-proclaimed levels of happiness, thus identifying some impacts of socialization. What is infinitely clearer is that deprivation of human interaction can have drastic negative effects physiologically, which aids the hypothesis that relational goods at the very least have health-related utility.

Theories on relational goods can have many policy implications for governments. Policies that increase Gross Domestic Product while negatively effecting an individual's ability to consume and produce relational goods, may have negative long-term impacts on society as a whole.

== The production of relational goods ==
In mainstream economics, the production of commodities employs manufactured capital (tools and implements), natural capital, human capital, and financial capital. All of these contribute to the creation of a good or service valued for its mostly observable physical properties. In contrast, relational goods are produced in sympathetic, empathetic, trusting, and high regard relationships referred to here and by others as social capital. Social capital rich exchange partners exchange what Robison and Flora (2003) refer to as intangible socio-emotional goods (SEGs), which are capable of satisfying socio-emotional needs. When SEGs become embedded in or associated with commodities and other objects, they create an attachment value for the object in addition to its value connected to its physical properties. The result of embedding objects with SEGs is the creation of a relational good referred to as an attachment value good (AVG) that may be tangible or intangible. Though not always called by that name, AVGs are abundant in social life: wedding rings, meaningful songs, family photos, hometowns, artifacts in museums, religious symbols, mementos of emotionally charged experiences, and prized family heirlooms.

== Happiness and relational goods ==
In their 2009 paper Income, Relational goods and Happiness, Becchetti, Londono Bedoya and Trovato were able to study 100,000 people from 82 countries and concluded that increased consumption of relational goods is strongly linked to happiness. They were also able to reflect on the "fellow feelings" theory which stated that relational goods increase in their ability to generate happiness with:

1. Increased time and experiences the interactors share
2. The mutual consent of the interactors

This hypothesis suggests that closer, warmer relationships garner more happiness, than colder relationships. They were able to see that time spent with close friends or fellow religious congregation members more strongly increased a person's happiness than did spending time with colleagues outside of working hours. This strengthens the view that time and depth of experience has an impact of the value of a relational good.

=== Relational good-happiness-income connection ===
The question of whether income generate happiness is one that has plagued economists since Richard Easterlin (1974) published research that showed that increased income didn't generate the same proportional increase in wealth. Easterlin theorized that crowding out concept, where pursuit of increased wealth has a negative effect on non-material goods like maintaining relationships. Becchetti, Londono Bedoya and Trovato found in 2009 that at the highest income levels, time for relationship is negatively affected. However, they also found that this effect is reversed in other income groups as raised income levels increases the amount of free time available to dedicate to relationships. Meanwhile, others, like economist Justin Wolfers dispute this and place a much higher importance on money and financial security. Where Easterlin found that happiness didn't necessary correlate to money, Wolfers found in a study of 155 countries that richer countries and people are also generally happier. On this issue, Becchetti, Pelloni, Rossetti (2007) discovered that relative income is also a relevant factor. They found that an increase in income of a member of social group relative to your own income can actually have a negative effect on happiness.

Regardless of the dispute on how important money is, what is less in dispute is that money is not the only factor. Traditionally, happiness, a notoriously difficult concept to measure, is defined economically as utility and is expressed as an extension of choice, i.e. the more choices available, the more happiness you can/do attain. The study of relational goods suggests that happiness can be correlated to the consumption of relational goods.

=== Relational goods and television ===
The average American watches about 5 hours of TV per day. In their paper Watching alone: Relational goods, television and happiness (2008) Bruni and Stanca were able to show that increased television watching time reduces consumption of relational goods as individuals use television as a substitute for relationships, thus crowding out relationships. This supports previous research that has shown that increased television time is negatively correlated to life satisfaction. One a direct level, Bruni and Stanca were able to show that increased television time takes away from time spent socializing, and also that television reduces communications within gatherings. Secondly television, through advertisement, has the indirect effect of propagating the consensus that material goods improve life satisfaction to a greater degree than do relational goods.

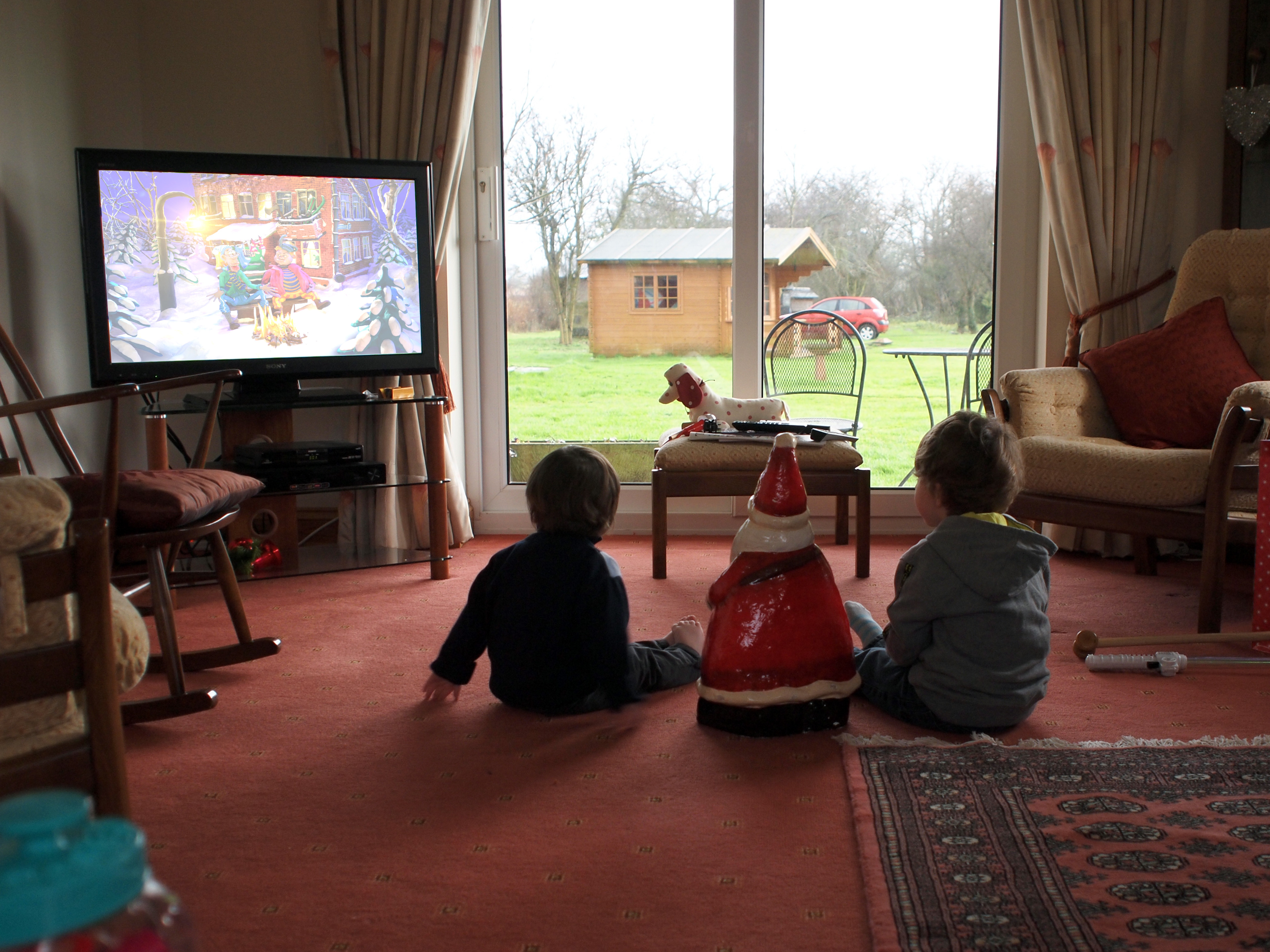
People watch increasing amounts of television. This potentially takes time away from forging relationships

Despite the reality that television correlates to unhappiness, the habit propagates because firstly, television is a cheap medium that requires no effort for a proportionally high degree of entertainment, compared to the higher degree of effort necessitated in socialization. Furthermore, television is highly addictive. The golden age of television has successfully created a pseudo-reality that people can escape to, alienating them from others. On the other hand, evolutionary psychologist Robin Dunbar has shown that gossip evolved as an aid to social bonding, and about 2/3 of our conversations can be boiled down to gossip (defined as discussions on social topics). Discussing television shows is arguably a sub-set of this, and can thus help in forming relationships.

== Policy implications of relational goods ==
Other research, such as the work of Blessi et al., has shown that people prefer cultural social activities of a non-instrumental nature, where relational goods can easily be shared, these types of activities in turn tend it improve one's well-being. This has several implications to government policy. If relational goods are currently under-consumed, then it may need organizational provision from government.

Policies like increasing access to public spaces for collaboration, providing opportunities for volunteering or other sociable activities, all help that may improve well-being. This can help improve total happiness which as many positive consequences for overall stability and productivity within a nation. The United Nations General Assembly has also suggested that nations measure their citizens’ Gross National Happiness, and use it to extrapolate policy. Research suggests that increasing relational goods consumption will also increase happiness.

Unfortunately, relational goods and their direct impact is hard to measure, making investments into increasing their consumption hard for governments to make tangible. However, policies that encourage engagement tend to have positive effects can also be (socially) profitable. Consider for example, the provision or promotion of group volunteer opportunities.

== Consumption of Relational Goods in varied demographics ==
In general, it has been found that relational good are not equally shared among peoples. It has been found that females consume and produce more relational goods in general. This is concurrent with other research that has proven women to be more empathetic, an emotion that lends itself well to socialization and may be considered a relational good.

Furthermore, it has been found that older people as well as less educated people are happier and consume more relational goods. This may be an issue of choice, where they are less capable of doing solo activities, and are generally more dependent on a framework of people. Therefore, relationships are more vital, and thus they reap the rewards of relational good. Others have suggested that older people are happier due to an improved level of emotional intelligence. As for less educated people, findings about relational goods being more widely consumed within that demographic supports statistical evidence that shows that less educated people aren't necessarily less happy. This is an economical issue as choice and happiness are often correlated. While education significantly improves choice in material goods, the traditional yardstick for happiness, it does less to improve your options in relational goods, and may in fact reduce your options as more educated people tend to work longer hours, thus leaving less time for relationships.

== See also ==
- Positional good
- Public good (economics)
