= Easterlin =

Easterlin is a surname. Notable people with the surname include:

- John Easterlin, American opera singer
- Julia Easterlin (born 1989), American singer-songwriter and musician
- Richard Easterlin (1926–2024), American economist
  - Easterlin paradox
  - Easterlin hypothesis

== See also ==
- Easterling (surname)
