= Easterling =

Easterling may refer to:

- a surname, see Easterling (surname)
- The Easterling, a former express passenger train to East Anglia occasionally revived for rail enthusiasts
- a member of a people in J. R. R. Tolkien's Middle-earth, see Easterling (Middle-earth)
- Easterling Correctional Facility, a men's prison located in Clio, Barbour County, Alabama
- an antiquated term for Baltic merchants who trade in sterling silver

== See also ==
- Easterlin
