= International Day of Happiness =

Celebrated day

- Also called: Happiness Day
- Observed by: All UN Member States
- Type: United Nations International Declaration
- Celebrations: Multiple worldwide events
- Date: 20 March
- Next time: 20 March 2027
- Frequency: Annual

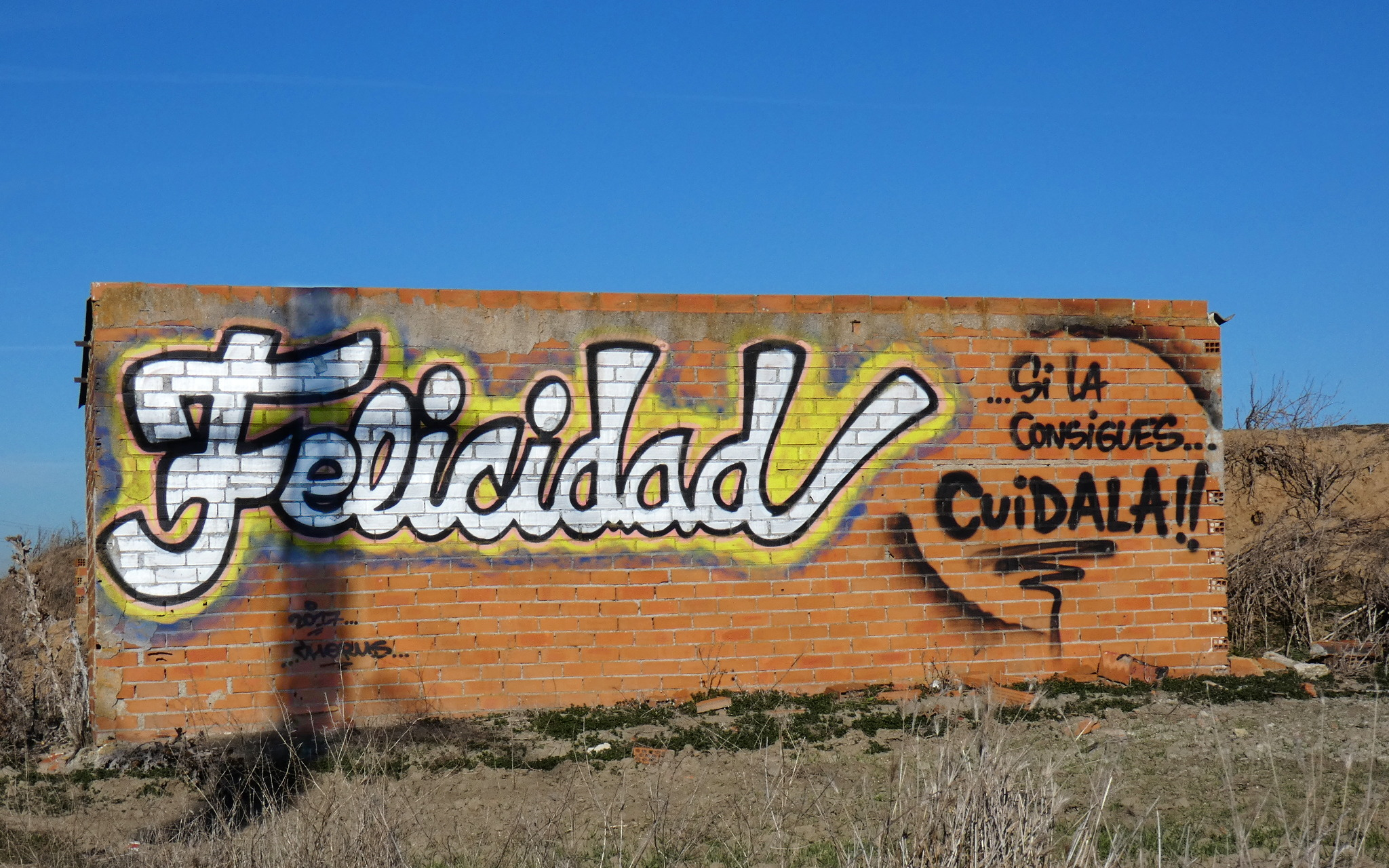
Felicidad. "Happiness ...if you get it... take care of it"

The International Day of Happiness is celebrated throughout the world on 20 March. It was established by the United Nations General Assembly on 28 June 2012.

The International Day of Happiness aims to make people around the world realize the importance of happiness within their lives.

In 2015, the United Nations launched 17 Sustainable Development Goals to make people's lives happier. Its main development goals are eradicate poverty, reduce inequality and protect our planet.

The United Nations invites people of all ages to join in celebrating the International Day of Happiness.

Assembly Resolution A/RES/66/281 states in pertinent part:

The General Assembly, Conscious that the pursuit of happiness is a fundamental human goal, Recognizing also the need for a more inclusive, equitable and balanced approach to economic growth that promotes sustainable development, poverty eradication, happiness and the well-being of all peoples, Decides to proclaim 20 March the International Day of Happiness, Invites all Member States, organizations of the United Nations system and other international and regional organizations, as well as civil society, including non-governmental organizations and individuals, to observe the International Day of Happiness in an appropriate manner, including through education and public awareness-raising activities[...]

— United Nations General Assembly, Resolution adopted by the General Assembly on 28 June 2012

== History ==
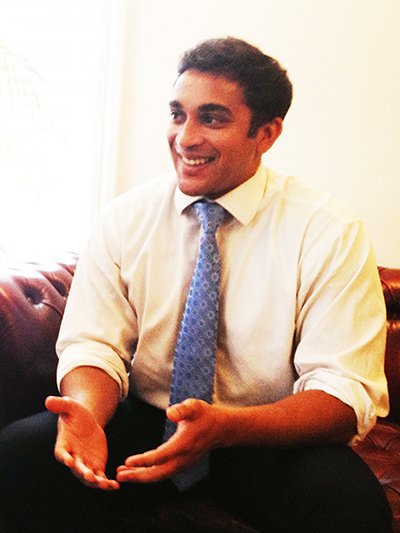
Jayme Illien discussing Happiness economics

Before the International Day of Happiness was established, together with Luis Gallardo, President of the World Happiness Foundation, Jayme Illien founded "Happytalism." Illien ran a campaign at the United Nations from 2006 to 2012 to encourage and advance the primacy of happiness, well-being, and democracy.

In 2011, Jayme Illien proposed the idea of the International Day of Happiness at the United Nations General Assembly. He wanted the United Nations General Assembly to promote Happiness economics around the world by improving the economic development of all countries. The idea was adopted by the United Nations General Assembly. On 19 July 2011, the United Nations General Assembly passed UN resolution 65/309, Happiness Toward A Holistic Approach To Growth, an initiative of then-Prime Minister Jigme Thinley of Bhutan, a country that has famously pursued the target of ""Gross National Happiness"" since the 1970s.

The International Day of Happiness officially established it in 2012 and first commemorated it in 2013. Building on the concept of Jayme Illien, the United Nations has taken a step forward with World Happiness Day to inform people about the importance of happiness in people's lives and the need to incorporate happiness into public policies.

== Celebration ==
On World Happiness Day, the United Nations General Assembly calls for people to make more continuous progress in the small things that continue to make their lives better.

Share happiness with friends and family on the International Day of Happiness. Taking the time to note and appreciate what one has to be thankful for, even the little things, will make people feel happier and more fulfilled in life. Consider making this a daily habit, such as keeping a gratitude log. Spend time with loved ones and try to repair any relationships that are going through a tough patch since good quality relationships are crucial to happiness. Try a step-by-step program, where you meet with like-minded individuals on a daily basis to assist each other in taking action and living healthier lives. You may also donate to or work with a charity that encourages good deeds of your choosing. Social networking is another way to connect with others. It's a particularly powerful tool on this day because it helps us to instantly share and spread our activities, as well as the joy they bring, all over the world.

=== Ukrainian Smiley ===
For the International Day of Happiness in 2022, a smiley was projected onto notable buildings around the world in an attempt to spread happiness. The smileys didn't contain any message on the projections, instead the top half was blue and the bottom half yellow, to replicate the Ukrainian flag. It came at a time when the Russo-Ukrainian War had just begun, with the smiley to display not only happiness, but solidarity with Ukraine. Cities where the Ukrainian smiley was displayed included New York, Los Angeles, London, Berlin, Paris, Rio de Janeiro, Rome and Sydney.

== Official Advocacy ==
On 22 January 2013, then UN Secretary General Ban Ki-moon stated in an address to the UN General Assembly and focus on people should get together facing the problems we have, and try to achieve the mission that to meet a society with happiness.

=== The Official Information by Happiness day ===
==== Ten steps to meet the goal of global happiness in 2021 ====
1. Do things that make you happy
2. Tell Everyone
3. Participate in and celebrate the World Happiness Contest
4. Give and spread happiness to others
5. To celebrate
6. Share the things that make you happy on social media
7. Promote the resolution
8. We will advance the United Nations global goals for sustainable development
9. Enjoy nature
10. Adopt happytalism

==== Seven main missions in 2021 ====
1. Happiness as a fundamental human right and goal for all
2. Happiness as a universal aspiration in the lives of all
3. Happiness as a way of living, being, and serving communities and society
4. Happiness as a north star for individuals, communities, governments, and society.
5. Happiness path toward achieving the sustainable development goals
6. Happiness as a "new paradigm' for human development
7. Worldwide celebration of the international day of happiness that is democratic, diverse, organic, and inclusive

== See also ==
- Happiness
- Gross National Happiness
- Happiness economics
- Satisfaction with Life Index
- World Happiness Report
- Annual ancient Nowruz celebrations, the beginning of Spring on 20 or 21 March.
