= Millennial lifestyle subsidy =

2010s economic phenomenon

The millennial lifestyle subsidy refers to the artificial reduction of prices for consumers during the 2010s by Silicon Valley tech investors seeking to onboard new users quickly. Lowered prices allowed easier access to a higher quality-of-life for Millennials, the main beneficiaries, largely until interest rates rose in the early 2020s.

== As a business model ==
Discounted services are designed to onboard users to new apps and start-ups. Subsidies allow for first-mover advantage as other companies struggle to compete with prices.

Lifestyle subsidies may act as a tradeoff for consumers, balancing out business practices that may be considered unseemly, such as dynamic pricing or hiring "underpaid" independent contractors.

=== Price rises ===
In the 2020s, after interest rates climbed during the 2021–2023 inflation surge, app-based service prices rose.

In some cases, companies floating on investor capital entirely replaced extant industries, removing cheap consumer choices when capital dried up.

== Legacy ==
While Millennials struggled to afford homes, some have pointed to lifestyle subsidies as a consolation.

Some have speculated of a "Gen Z lifestyle subsidy" being Buy now, pay later services or cheap access to large language models.

== See also ==
- Disruptive innovation
- Lifestyle creep
- Zero interest-rate policy
