= Robert Eriksson =

Robert Eriksson may refer to:

- Robert Eriksson (politician)
- Robert Eriksson (tennis)
- Robert Eriksson (speedway rider)

== See also ==
- Matz Robert Eriksson, drummer of Swedish rock band The Hellacopters
- Robert S. Erikson, political scientist
