= Source bias =

Source bias is the tendency to select information sources to support a confirmation bias or negativity bias on a particular set of beliefs or values. Source bias plays an important role in generating echo chambers. In news reporting, source bias affects how news organizations do news gathering in whom they choose to talk, and in news analysis, what they imply in the way they arrange facts collected.

Signs of a biased source

Though it is difficult to find an unbiased source in today's age, it is not impossible. Here are some things to avoid when selecting a source: language that appears quite opinionated, claims that are not supported by an outside source, facts that are presented to guide you, the reader, to a specific conclusion, inappropriate language, an author that is not specified or credible, or sources that try to sell you something in disguise.

Oftentimes, primary historical sources (sources from firsthand authors who were present for the events) can be written from an extreme point of view. If the source seems to be overly positive and to omit negative details (or vice versa), if it fails to mention information that you are aware of, or if the source's information is clearly incorrect, then you can assume that it is written from a biased point of view.
