= Self-transforming brain =

The self-transforming brain refers to the ability of the self to consciously use mental activity to change/modify the brain's neural network in order to experience life with more happiness and fulfillment. This capacity of using awareness to do so is based on the assumption that the brain and the mind are closely connected, that one does not change without the other. The phrase "I think therefore I am" is not only a famous proclamation in the eyes of neuroscience. It has been evidenced that mental activities such as fleeting thoughts and feelings can create new neural structures in the brain and thus shape a person's reality. Therefore, it is possible to make use of the brain's neuroplasticity to re-wire or change one's brain and life by consciously activating happy, tranquil and loving mental states.

== Background: Brain-evolution link ==
The experience of happiness and well-being is a universal pursuit, but often a struggle to achieve. One explanation for this is that happiness is not the brain's default and normal state of mind, whereas the Evolutionary psychologists claim that suffering is. Suffering in the form of everyday stress, hurt, anger, loneliness, worry and disappointment experienced by the layperson is thought to be the side effect of strategies that helped human ancestors survive and pass on their genes throughout evolution. In this manner, the neural networks in the human brain have evolved to create pain and suffering when the evolutionary instincts cannot keep up with the outside world. This happens, for example, when the brain attempts to separate the body and the self from a world where everything is connected. Consequently, the weaknesses of an individual's body become personal weaknesses, and the individual suffers as a result of negative self-image, illness and aging. Another survival strategy embedded in the neural networks of the brain is the tendency to approach pleasure and avoid pain, which is why humans suffer when they experience mental states with a negative feeling tone.

== Bias ==
Due to the strong impact of evolution on the human brain, what the modern man is left with is a negativity bias, which colours the manner in which humans perceive and interpret events within the environment. This bias is the reason why the mind in particular, scans for, remembers and reacts to unpleasant experiences and why emotions such as worry, anxiety and fear of anticipated negative outcomes often follow. However, the negativity bias does not correspond with reality, as humans are most often not in danger. Even so, the brain simulates worst-case scenarios and creates additional worry and fear over events that most likely never will occur. Consequently, this process strengthens these neural structures and humans suffer even more.

== Self-transformation through meditation ==
=== The nervous system ===
The neuroplasticity of the brain allows re-wiring of default neural pathways through conscious acts performed by the individual. As the sympathetic nervous system (SNS) is responsible for stress-related hormones that activate mental states such as anxiety, irritation, stress and melancholy that make individuals unhappy, action must be taken by the individual to activate the parasympathetic nervous system (PNS). The PNS can on the contrary, end suffering created by the SNS as it produces feelings of relaxation, contentment and reflective insight that are necessary for the conscious re-wiring of the default neural networks that constantly scans for threats.

=== Meditation ===
One powerful way of activating the PNS is by using the mind-body connection through meditation. Meditation is often equated with mindfulness. Both concepts refer to the act of consciously using one's attention to be aware of what occurs moment-to-moment in one's outer and inner environment with a non-judgemental attitude. Attention resembles a spotlight; whatever it casts light on will flow into the mind and shape the brain. By developing control of attention through meditation the individual will consequently have the agency to choose what mental activity that should shape the brain, and thus, the experienced reality. In this manner, it is possible to transform the brain's default negative neural structure that leads to suffering.

=== Techniques to control attention ===
The practice of meditation can include a wide range of techniques that aim to activate the PNS through sustained conscious attention and concentration. However, the ability to restrain attention is a challenging and unnatural pursuit for the brain, as it constantly attempts to update the individual's awareness with new information. There are methods that can be used to develop greater control of attention:

• Setting an objective to be mindful – at the start of an activity that requires concentration, establishing a deliberate objective to remain focused, such as "I am going to let my mind be steady."

• Remaining awake and alert to the environment - the brain cannot pay attention when sleep-deprived. For example, sitting up in a straight posture helps as this sends information to the reticular formation, which is involved in consciousness, telling it to stay vigilant to environmental stimuli. Another technique is taking deep breaths. This increases oxygen in the brain, which keeps it awake.

• Silencing the mind. When the mind is silenced, there are fewer things to distract attention. For example, by creating an awareness of the whole body. Involved in this process is the right hemisphere, which represents whole-body processing. By initiating activities as such that the right hemisphere specializes in, the verbal babble of the left hemisphere is silenced.

=== Physical and Psychological Health Benefits ===
As the PNS is activated through meditation, it quietens the SNS, which is responsible for a majority of human psychological suffering. The activation and alteration of brain structure has also been related to a number of physical and psychological health benefits:

• A resilient affective style and increased mood. The absence of stress hormones in SNS activation allows for prefrontal activation and regulation of the amygdala, both of which are necessary for the experience of these states.

• Strengthening of the immune system as a result of an increase in antibodies. This is the result of activation of the left-sided anterior through meditation practice.

• Increase in empathy and compassion. The cultivation of positive affect through mental training stimulates the activation of the anterior cingulate cortices that have been previously linked to empathic responses to another person's pain.
