= Benjamin Radcliff =

U.S. American political scientist

Benjamin Radcliff (August 28, 1963 – June 10, 2024) was an American political scientist and a professor at the University of Notre Dame. He was also affiliated with the Rooney Center for the Study of American Democracy and the Higgins Labor Studies Program. Though best known for his work on the connections between politics and human happiness, his research also encompassed democratic theory, political economy, and the study of organized labor.

== Education and career ==
Radcliff attended the University of Illinois at Urbana-Champaign where he obtained a B.A. in 1984. He graduated from there in 1991 with a Ph.D. in Political Science. While he has held faculty appointments at Rutgers University and Vanderbilt University, the majority of his academic career has been spent at the University of Notre Dame. He was a fellow at the Robert Penn Warren Center for the Humanities and at the Netherlands Institute for Advanced Study. In 2014 he was in residence as a Fulbright U.S. Scholar at the Roosevelt Study Center, in the Netherlands.

== Early research ==
In a series of scholarly articles in the 1990s, Radcliff attempted a radical reinterpretation of the implications for democratic thought of social theory in general, and Arrow's impossibility theorem in particular. Rather than the familiar suggestion, associated most closely with the work of William H. Riker, that Arrow's work suggested that democracy must by logical necessity be limited to the minimal form associated with classical Liberalism, Radcliff argued that social choice theory actually supported more robust or populistic conceptions of democracy.

This work culminated in a 2000 article in The Journal of Politics that sought to establish that the only democratic models to survive the challenges posed by social choice theory were in fact the radical interpretations of democracy known as participatory democracy or deliberative democracy. This article won the award for best article published in The Journal of Politics in that year.

During this same period, Radcliff (sometimes in collaboration with his colleague Alexander Pacek of Texas A&M University) produced a series of empirical articles focusing, among other things, on the connections between organized labor, political participation, the welfare state, and electoral outcomes in the industrial democracies and across the American States.

== Later research ==
Radcliff's later work focused on the social scientific study of happiness within the multi-disciplinary field sometimes labeled as happiness economics. In a 2001 article in the American Political Science Review he provided extensive econometric evidence in support of the contention that social democracy in general, and an expansive, universalistic welfare state in particular, contributed to greater levels of life satisfaction across the Western world. He concludes that the principal determinant of quality of life, controlling for economic or cultural conditions which might also play a role, is the degree to which a society protects its citizens against impersonal market forces as measured by the degree of decommodification it provides.

This general theme was developed in a series of subsequent papers, which extended these conclusions by using different indicators (such as happiness as well as life satisfaction), employing pooled time series analysis over a larger number of countries and other methodological and theoretical innovations. In his most recent major paper on the subject, Radcliff and colleagues extend this analysis to a comparative study of the American states, showing that life satisfaction is promoted, controlling for other factors, by the state's level of welfare spending, the degree of economic regulation in favor of workers or consumers, and its history of rule by liberal (or Democratic) state governments.

Radcliff also devoted a series of papers to the role that labor organization plays in promoting human happiness. His empirical analyses suggested that two fundamental conclusions: (1) individuals who belong to (or are represented by) labor unions have higher levels of life satisfaction that others of similar income, education, age, gender, marital status, physical health, and other similar factors, and, more importantly (2) that the aggregate level of labor organization—the "density" of organization, meaning the percentage of the work force organized—appears to increase subjective appraisal of life for everyone, whether members of unions or not. These effects, he stressed, are independent of the impact unions might have on life satisfaction through their traditional support for the welfare state.

Radcliff's research program culminated in the publication of his book The Political Economy of Human Happiness: How Voters' Choices Determine the Quality of Life. Cambridge University Press; (2013) ISBN 978-1-107-64442-7

== Criticism ==
Radcliff's critique of Riker's work on the connections between social choice theory and democratic theory was the subject of an exchange between Riker and himself in the journal Political Research Quarterly.

Radcliff's contention that there is a positive connection between the extent of electoral participation (turnout) and the share of the vote received by the Democratic Party in U.S. elections has been criticized, in separate analyses, by political scientists Robert Erikson and Jack Nagel. Radcliff followed with a reply to Erikson.

Radcliff's work on happiness and the welfare state has been the subject of an extensive critique by the political scientist Tom Rice and colleagues, who in particular questions the direction of causality in Radcliff's empirical results, suggesting that it may be that happier citizens are simply more supportive of the welfare state rather than the welfare state producing happier people. Radcliff gives several arguments against this 'reverse casualty' hypothesis in his book The Political Economy of Human Happiness: How Voters' Choices Determine the Quality of Life. Cambridge University Press; (2013) ISBN 978-1-107-64442-7, including a demonstration that individuals' support for welfare in fact correlates negatively with life satisfaction.

== Non-academic writings ==
Radcliff wrote Understanding Zen (Charles Tuttle, Boston, 1993) as an accessible introduction to Zen in particular and Eastern philosophy more generally. It draws upon both the modern philosophy of science and familiar strands of Western philosophy, such as existentialism. A German language edition entitled Zen Denken was published by Herder (Freiburg: 1995). ISBN 3-451-04396-3

== Personal life ==
The Department of Political Science at the University of Notre Dame announced that Radcliff died on June 10, 2024, honoring him as "an outstanding scholar, but an even better mentor, colleague, and friend. He will be sorely missed."
