= Positivity offset =

Cognitive bias

In psychology, the positivity offset is a phenomenon where people tend to interpret neutral situations as mildly positive, and rate their lives as good, most of the time. The positivity offset stands in notable asymmetry to the negativity bias.

== Similarities and differences to Negativity Bias ==
Two studies were presented within a single study that looked at the difference between positivity offset and negative bias to see if it is good or bad for some people. The first study measured an individual’s reactions to different stimuli such as pictures, sounds, and words. The results from this study have also seen evidence, in comparison to other studies, that the positivity offset is in favor of positive stimuli over negative stimuli. The opposite effect is true for negative bias. An interesting observation that was made in this study was that positivity offset and negative bias was predicted in different behaviors rather than from established measures focused on personality. The second study sought to replicate the findings and compare those to the findings that have been found in other studies. The result of this study has also found evidence to suggest that positivity offset is preferred when the affective level input is not significant, whereas negative bias is favored when the level of input is significant. One of the keys to understanding both the positivity offset and the negative bias is that the inputs of both are not meant to be separate, but both exist within the affective input level. The affective input level is a process to see what effect a certain stimulus has on an individual.

Two measures that have been used to look at the validity of both positivity offset and negative bias are based on judgment and personality. The measure of judgment focused on if there was a connection between locations of both spatial and affect. In other words, they measure to see if an individual understands what the stimulus is and how it affects them. The personality measure, on the other hand, speculates whether an individual defines a stimulus as being either positive or negative.

== Positivity offset and Negativity bias in depression ==
Regarding depression, there has been evidence to suggest that there is a connection between positivity offset and negative bias affecting the way that stimuli are perceived. The negative bias had a stronger influence than the positivity offset when the participants were depressed. For those who were healthy individuals, the results of both positivity offset, and negative bias were the same. This suggests that the positivity offset occurs when someone’s mind is considered to be healthy. The researchers go on to mention that their results regarding those individuals who were on the depressed side showed evidence that pleasing or neutral stimuli as being less positive compared to the results of the healthy individuals. The results of this study do show similarity to that of other studies in that positive emotions are not likely found in those who are in a depressed state. Those who are depressed may have an aversive side, but their motivational side to do things is not there. The concepts of both positivity offset and negative bias can also be analyzed from an element of positive valence.

It is proposed that if this element is defined as being inactive, then there will be more assessments of stimuli that are perceived as being negative rather than as positive. While there may be more ratings with the negative stimuli, at the same time, assessments for positive stimuli of positive valence are hindered. This is the case even with stimuli that are in the middle that is perceived with positivity offset.

== In perception ==
Social neuroscience researcher John Cacioppo has assembled evidence that people typically see their surroundings as positive, whenever a clear threat is not present. Because of the positivity offset, people are motivated to explore and engage with their surroundings, instead of being balanced inactive between approach and avoidance.

== In life satisfaction ==
Across most cultures, nations, and groups of people, the average and median ratings of life satisfaction are not neutral, as one might expect, but mildly positive.

Groups of people who do not show a positivity offset include people with depression, people in severe poverty, and people who live in perpetually threatening situations. However, multiple groups of people that outsiders would not expect to show the positivity offset do, such as people with paraplegia and spinal injury, very elderly people, and people with multiple chronic illnesses. In some cases these individuals never become as satisfied or happy with their lives as before their illness or injury, but over time (generally approximately two years), they still stabilize at a level substantially above neutral. That is, they judge themselves overall as satisfied or happy and not dissatisfied or unhappy.

Many of the major psychological publications on life satisfaction ratings have come from Ed Diener and colleagues. This empirical work gathered life-satisfaction judgments from multiple modern and traditional cultures worldwide.

== See also ==
- Hedonic treadmill
