= Satisfaction paradox =

Phenomenon where negative circumstances have little impact on well-being

The satisfaction paradox is an empirical phenomenon in quality-of-life research, describing how objectively negative life circumstances have relatively little impact on an individual's subjective well-being. This counterintuitive effect challenges the assumption that adverse conditions directly correlate with lower life satisfaction.

== Examples ==
=== Financial satisfaction ===
Older adults often report higher financial satisfaction than younger adults despite having lower incomes. While this has traditionally been attributed to psychological adaptation, research using data from the Norwegian NorLAG study suggests a material explanation: older adults generally possess more assets and have less debt, which enhances their financial well-being. However, this wealth advantage does not explain the paradox among low-income elderly individuals, as they have little accumulated wealth. Since older individuals with limited income and wealth still report higher financial satisfaction than younger counterparts, an "aging paradox" persists in financial satisfaction research.

=== Customer service ===
The Service Recovery Paradox (SRP) refers to a phenomenon where customers report higher satisfaction after a well-handled service failure than if no failure had occurred. Introduced by McCollough and Bharadwaj in 1992, SRP suggests that effective resolutions, such as upgrades or personalized apologies, can increase customer loyalty. Both SRP and the Satisfaction Paradox involve cases where negative conditions lead to unexpectedly high satisfaction. In SRP, satisfaction rises after service failures are resolved, while in the Satisfaction Paradox, individuals report higher well-being despite objectively poor life circumstances, defying expectations.

=== Lifestyle choices ===
The Satisfaction-Behavior Paradox in lifestyle choices refers to the phenomenon where individuals report high satisfaction with their diet and physical activity, even if they are overweight or obese. A study conducted in Jazan, Saudi Arabia, found that despite significant health risks—such as high rates of inactivity, low fruit and vegetable consumption, and obesity—participants reported high satisfaction with their weight (71.12%) and eating habits (71.59%). This paradox suggests that individuals may feel content with their lifestyle choices, even when these behaviors are not conducive to optimal health, highlighting a disconnect between perceived and actual health outcomes.

== Explanation ==
The satisfaction paradox can be explained by a number of factors, including:

=== Psychological accommodation ===
Whereas research has found that older adults often report higher financial satisfaction than younger adults, despite having lower incomes, this has traditionally been attributed to psychological accommodation to financial hardship. However, a study using data from the Norwegian NorLAG study suggests that material circumstances, such as greater assets and less debt, play a more significant role in financial satisfaction for the elderly than previously believed. The higher satisfaction in older age is largely due to these factors, though the effect is less apparent in those with low income and wealth, maintaining an "aging paradox" where older, poor individuals are still more financially satisfied than their younger, equally poor counterparts.

=== Perception vs. reality ===
People may have different perceptions of how long an unpleasant experience lasts due to cognitive biases. For instance, during a frustrating service interaction, customers may feel that time drags on longer than it actually does. Behavioral science suggests that people tend to overestimate the duration of unpleasant experiences because of heightened emotional responses. In contrast, enjoyable experiences tend to feel faster because they are processed more fluidly. This discrepancy in perceived time highlights the importance for companies to understand not just actual wait times or interactions, but how customers feel about those moments, as it directly impacts satisfaction and loyalty.

=== Material circumstances ===
Research suggests that assets and debt play a more significant role in financial satisfaction than previously thought. The "satisfaction paradox," where older adults report greater financial contentment despite lower incomes, is often attributed to psychological adaptation. However, a study indicates that the key factor is actually the wealth gap between age groups. Older adults tend to have more assets and less debt, which contributes to their higher financial satisfaction. In contrast, this effect is less pronounced for those with low income and little wealth, as financial satisfaction remains higher in older individuals compared to younger counterparts in similar economic situations.

== Implications of the satisfaction paradox ==
The satisfaction paradox highlights the disparity between individuals' perceived well-being and their actual health behaviors or conditions. This discrepancy underscores the necessity for tailored interventions, as broad strategies may not address the underlying causes of dissatisfaction. Personalized approaches that consider both perceptions and behaviors are crucial for enhancing quality of life.

== See also ==
- Paradox of hedonism
- Hedonic treadmill
- Diminishing returns
- Easterlin paradox
- Subjective well-being
- Maslow's hierarchy of needs
- Psychological adaptation
- Positive Psychology
- Life satisfaction
