= Easterlin paradox =

Finding in happiness economics

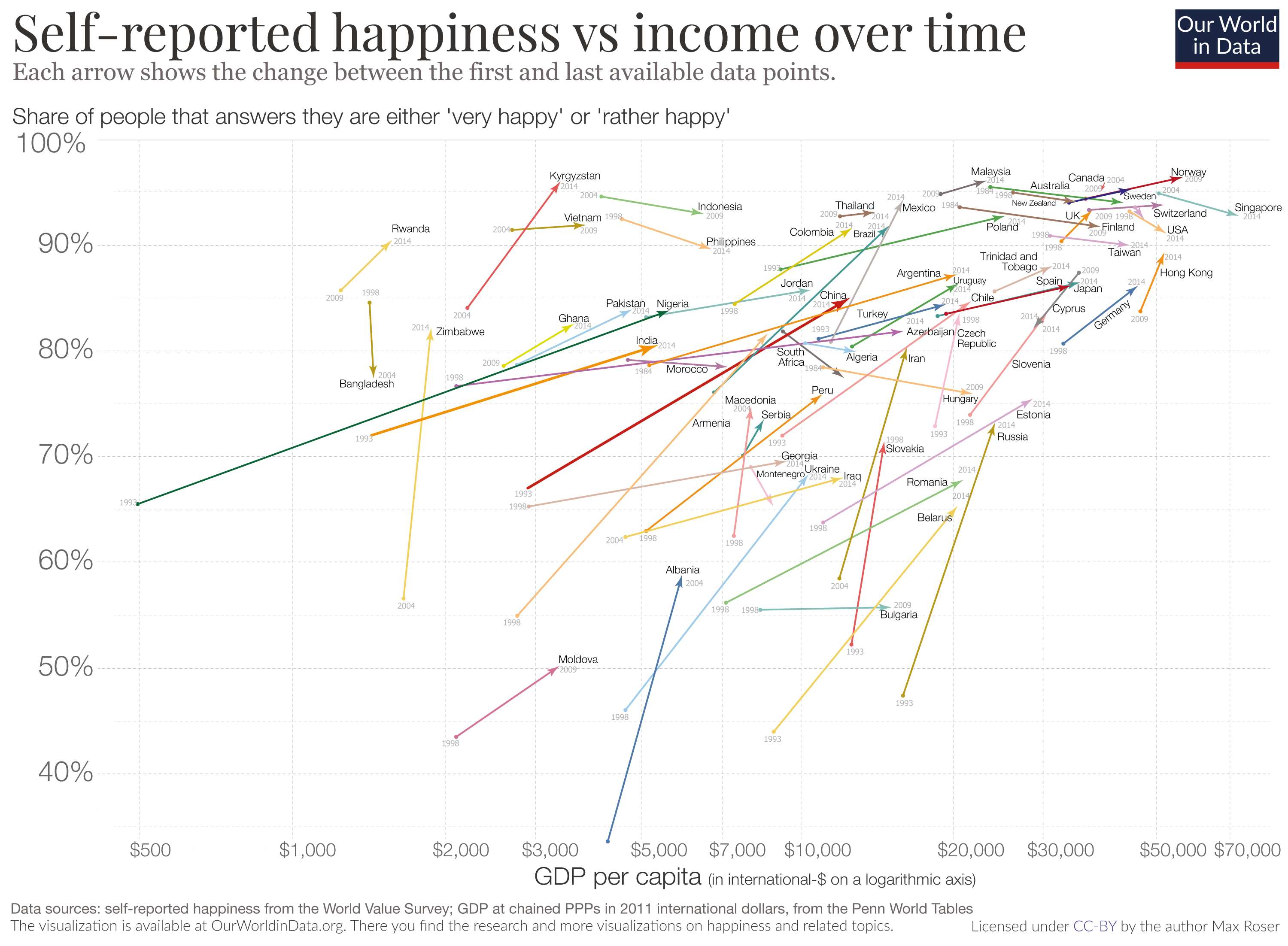
Data from the World Values Survey is used to plot the evolution of national average incomes and national average happiness over time. In general, economic growth and happiness growth tend to go together. Some countries, in some periods, experience economic growth without increasing happiness.

The Easterlin paradox is a finding in happiness economics formulated in 1974 by Richard Easterlin, then professor of economics at the University of Pennsylvania, and the first economist to study happiness data. Easterlin further refined his finding during his subsequent long career at the University of Southern California.

The paradox states that, at a point in time, happiness varies directly with income both among and within nations; but over time, happiness does not trend upward as income continues to grow: While people on higher incomes are typically happier than their lower-income counterparts at a given point in time, higher incomes don't produce greater happiness over time.

One explanation is that one's happiness depends on a comparison between their income and their perceptions of the average standard of living. If everyone's income increases, one's increased income gives a short boost to their happiness, since they do not realize that the average standard of living has gone up. Some time later, they realize that the average standard of living has also gone up, so the happiness boost produced by increased income disappears. It is the contradiction between the point-of-time and time series findings that is the root of the paradox: while there is a correlation at a fixed point, there is no trend over multiple points. That is, in the short run, everyone perceives increases in income to be correlated with happiness and tries to increase their incomes. However, in the long run, this proves to be an illusion, since everyone's efforts to raise standards of living lead to increasing averages, leaving everyone in the same place in terms of relative income. Various theories have been advanced to explain the paradox, but the paradox itself is solely an empirical generalization. The existence of the paradox has been strongly disputed by other researchers. Economist Easterlin argues that increased income does not necessarily increase well-being.

Richard Easterlin has updated the evidence and description of the paradox over time. His most recent contribution is from 2022.

== Evidence ==
The original evidence for the paradox was United States data. Subsequently, supporting findings were given for other developed nations and, more recently, for less developed countries and countries transitioning from socialism to capitalism. The original conclusion for the United States was based on data from 1946 to 1970; later evidence through 2014 confirmed the initial finding — the trend in United States happiness has been flat or even slightly negative over a roughly seven-decade stretch in which real incomes more than tripled.

The time-series conclusion of the paradox refers to long-term trends. As the economy expands and contracts, fluctuations in happiness occur together with those in income, but the fluctuations in income occur around a rising trend line, whereas those in happiness take place around a horizontal trend.

== Possible explanations ==
A couple of explanations for the paradox have been offered.

The first explanation draws on the effect of social comparison. The effect of additional money on how we feel about our lives is not just about how wealthy we are in absolute terms, but how wealthy we are compared to other people.

The second explanation appeals to hedonic adaptation and the fact that people get used to having more income and higher living standards. For example, the theory of hedonic adaptation would suggest that progress from iPhone 5s, to iPhone 6s, to iPhone 7s, to iPhone 8s and so on, have not made a lasting improvement to happiness.

== Criticism ==
Objections to the paradox focus on the time series generalization, that trends in happiness and income are not related. In a 2008 article economists Betsey Stevenson and Justin Wolfers state that "the core of the Easterlin paradox lies in Easterlin's failure to isolate statistically significant relationships between average levels of happiness and economic growth through time," and present time series evidence of a significant positive statistical association between happiness and income.

Easterlin and other researchers have examined data from the United States and Japan to analyze a seemingly paradoxical relationship between life satisfaction and economic growth. In Japan, data from the "Life in Nation" surveys, initiated in 1958, initially suggests that mean life satisfaction remained constant despite significant economic growth. Yet, Stevenson and Wolfers (2008) show that the survey questions evolved over time, complicating the assessment of changes in happiness. When the data is segmented into consistent sub-periods, a positive correlation between GDP and happiness growth emerges, indicating that the perceived paradox results from mismeasurement of happiness. In the United States, a different explanation arises from income inequality. Economic growth has not benefitted the majority; median household incomes have grown much more slowly than those of the top 10% over the past four decades. Therefore, trends in aggregate life satisfaction should not be seen as paradoxical, as the typical US citizen has experienced little growth in income and standard of living.

A 2012 article by Stevenson, Wolfers and Daniel Sacks returns to this time series criticism with new data, though at times the article asserts that the paradox is a contradiction between two types of cross-section evidence — data for persons and for countries. Outside of economics, two founding fathers in the study of self-reported happiness, Ed Diener in psychology, and Ruut Veenhoven in sociology, have each, with their collaborators, also presented evidence of a significantly positive time series relationship. A rebuttal by Easterlin points out that these studies do not focus on identifying long term trends; rather, they are based on time series that are short or have only two observations — in both cases, insufficient observations to establish a trend. The positive association they present is that between the fluctuations in happiness and income, not the trends.

It is sometimes said that the flattening of the happiness trend occurs after some minimum level of income. While cross-sectional data supports a curvilinear relationship between income and happiness in Chinese and Asian samples, time series for China and Japan, both of which start from low income levels, give no indication of a threshold.

== See also ==
- Subjective well-being
- Economic growth
- Hedonic treadmill
- Lifestyle creep
- Progress
- Satisfaction paradox
