= Hedonic treadmill =

Psychological concept

Graph showing how reported life satisfaction is affected by positive and negative events, and begins to return to the starting level afterward

The hedonic treadmill, also known as hedonic adaptation, is the conjecture that humans quickly return to a relatively stable level of happiness (or sadness) despite major positive or negative events or life changes. According to this theory, as a person makes more money, expectations and desires rise in tandem, resulting in no permanent gain in happiness.

== Overview ==
Hedonic adaptation is an event or mechanism that reduces the affective impact of substantial emotional events. Hedonic adaptation is the supposition that there is a happiness "set point", whereby humans generally maintain a constant level of happiness throughout their lives, despite events they experience. The process of hedonic adaptation is conceptualized as a treadmill, since no matter how hard one tries to be happier, one remains in the same place.

Hedonic adaptation can occur in a variety of ways. Generally, the process involves cognitive changes, such as shifting values, goals, attention and interpretation of a situation. The process of adaptation can occur through the tendency of humans to construct elaborate rationales for considering themselves deprived through a process that social theorist Gregg Easterbrook calls "abundance denial". Further, neurochemical processes might possibly desensitize overstimulated hedonic pathways in the brain, which possibly prevents persistently high levels of intense positive or negative feelings.

== Behavioral/psychological approach ==
"Hedonic treadmill" is a term coined by Brickman and Campbell in their article, "Hedonic Relativism and Planning the Good Society" (1971), describing the tendency of people to keep a fairly stable baseline level of happiness despite external events and fluctuations in demographic circumstances. In 1978 Brickman, et al., began to approach hedonic pleasure within the framework of Helson's adaptation level theory, which holds that perception of stimulation is dependent upon comparison of former stimulations. The hedonic treadmill functions similarly to most adaptations that serve to protect and enhance perception. In the case of hedonics, the sensitization or desensitization to circumstances or environment can redirect motivation. This reorientation functions to protect against complacency, but also to accept unchangeable circumstances.

Frederick and Loewenstein classify three types of processes in hedonic adaptation: shifting adaptation levels, desensitization, and sensitization. Shifting adaptation levels occurs when a person experiences a shift in what is perceived as a "neutral" stimulus, but maintains sensitivity to stimulus differences. For example, if Sam gets a raise he initially feels happier, then habituates to the larger salary and returns to his happiness set point. But he is still pleased when he gets a holiday bonus. Desensitization decreases sensitivity, which reduces sensitivity to change. Those who have lived in war zones for extended periods of time may become desensitized to the destruction that happens on a daily basis, and be less affected by the occurrence of serious injuries or losses that may once have been shocking and upsetting. Sensitization is an increase in hedonic response from continuous exposure, such as the increased pleasure and selectivity of connoisseurs for wine or food.

Brickman, Coates, and Janoff-Bulman were among the first to investigate the hedonic treadmill in their 1978 study, "Lottery Winners and Accident Victims: Is Happiness Relative?". Lottery winners and paraplegics were compared to a control group and as predicted, comparison (with past experiences and current communities) and habituation (to new circumstances) affected levels of happiness such that after the initial impact of the extremely positive or negative events, happiness levels typically went back to the average levels.

Brickman and Campbell originally implied that everyone returns to the same neutral set point after a significantly emotional life event. In the literature review "Beyond the Hedonic Treadmill, Revising the Adaptation Theory of Well-Being" (2006), Diener, Lucas, and Scollon concluded that people are not hedonically neutral and individuals have different set points that are at least partially heritable. They also concluded that individuals may have more than one happiness set point, such as a life satisfaction set point and a subjective well-being set point, and that because of this, one's level of happiness is not just one given set point but can vary within a given range. Diener and colleagues point to longitudinal and cross-sectional research to argue that the happiness set point can change, and lastly that individuals vary in the rate and extent of adaptation they exhibit to changes in circumstances.

== Empirical studies ==
In a longitudinal study conducted by Mancini, Bonnano, and Clark, people showed individual differences in how they responded to significant life events, such as marriage, divorce and widowhood. They noted that some individuals experience substantial changes to their hedonic set point over time, though others do not, and argue that happiness set point can be relatively stable throughout an individual's life, but the life satisfaction and subjective well-being set points are more variable.

Similarly, the longitudinal study conducted by Fujita and Diener (2005) described the life satisfaction set point as a "soft baseline". This means that for most people, this baseline is similar to their happiness baseline. Typically, life satisfaction hovers around a set point for the majority of their lives and does not change dramatically. However, for about a quarter of the population this set point is not stable and does move in response to a major life event.

Other longitudinal data has shown that subjective well-being set points do change over time, and that adaptation is not necessarily inevitable. In his archival data analysis, Lucas found evidence that it is possible for someone's subjective well-being set point to change drastically, such as in the case of individuals who acquire a severe, long-term disability. However, as Diener, Lucas, and Scollon point out, the amount of fluctuation a person experiences around their set point is largely dependent on the individual's ability to adapt.

After following over a thousand sets of twins for 10 years, Lykken and Tellegen (1996) concluded that almost 50% of our happiness levels are determined by genetics. Headey and Wearing (1989) suggested that our position on the spectrum of the stable personality traits (neuroticism, extraversion, and openness to experience) accounts for how we experience and perceive life events, and indirectly contributes to our happiness levels.

In large panel studies, divorce, death of a spouse, unemployment, disability, and similar events have been shown to change long-term subjective well-being, even though some adaptation does occur.

In the aforementioned Brickman study (1978), researchers interviewed 22 lottery winners and 29 paraplegics to determine their change in happiness levels due to their given event (winning the lottery or becoming paralyzed). The event in the case of lottery winners had taken place between one month and one and a half years before the study, and in the case of paraplegics between a month and a year. The lottery winners reported being similarly happy before and after the event and expected to have a similar level of happiness in a couple of years. They found that the paraplegics reported having a higher level of happiness in the past than the rest (due to a nostalgia effect), a lower level of happiness at the time of the study than the rest (although still above the middle point of the scale, that is, they reported being more happy than unhappy) and, surprisingly, they also expected to have similar levels of happiness to the rest in a couple of years. The paraplegics did have an initial decrease in life happiness, but they expected to eventually return to their baseline.

In a newer study (2007), winning a medium-sized lottery prize had a lasting mental wellbeing effect of 1.4 GHQ points on Britons even two years after the event.

A research study in mice suggests that resilience to suffering is partly due to a decreased fear response in the amygdala and increased levels of BDNF in the brain. This 2015 research found that changing a gene in mice increased resilience to depressing and traumatizing events such as forcing the mice to swim. This could have crucial benefits for those with anxiety and PTSD.

Hippocampus volume can affect mood, hedonic setpoints, and some forms of memory. A smaller hippocampus has been linked to depression and dysthymia. Certain activities and environmental factors can reset the hedonic setpoint and also grow the hippocampus to an extent.

Lucas, Clark, Georgellis, and Diener (2003) researched changes in baseline well-being due to changes in marital status, the birth of a first child, and the loss of employment. While they found that a negative life event can have a greater impact on a person's psychological state and happiness set point than a positive event, they concluded that people completely adapt, finally returning to their baseline level of well-being, after divorce, losing a spouse, the birth of a child, and for women losing their job. They did not find a return to baseline for marriage or for layoffs in men. This study also illustrated that the amount of adaptation depends on the individual.

Wildeman, Turney, and Schnittker (2014) studied the effects of imprisonment on baseline well-being. They researched how being in jail affects happiness both short-term (while in prison) and long-term (after being released). They found that being in prison has negative effects on one's baseline well-being; in other words one's baseline happiness is lower in prison than when not in prison. Once people were released from prison, they were able to bounce back to their previous level of happiness.

Silver (1982) researched the effects of a traumatic accident on one's baseline level of happiness. Silver found that accident victims could return to a happiness set point after a period of time. For eight weeks, Silver followed accident victims who had sustained severe spinal cord injuries. About a week after their accident, Silver observed that the victims were experiencing much stronger negative emotions than positive ones. By the eighth and final week, the victims' positive emotions outweighed their negative ones. The results suggest that regardless of whether a life event is significantly negative or positive, people almost always return to their happiness baseline.

Fujita and Diener (2005) studied the stability of one's level of subjective well-being over time and found that for most people, there is a relatively small range in which their level of satisfaction varies. They asked a panel of 3,608 German residents to rate their current and overall satisfaction with life on a scale of 0–10, once a year for seventeen years. Only 25% of participants exhibited shifts in their level of life satisfaction over the course of the study, with just 9% of participants having experienced significant changes. They also found that those with a higher mean level of life satisfaction had more stable levels of life satisfaction than those with lower levels.

== Applications ==
=== Happiness set point ===
The concept of a happiness set point (proposed by Sonja Lyubomirsky) can be applied in clinical psychology to help patients return to their hedonic set point when negative events happen. Determining when someone is mentally distant from their happiness set point and what events trigger those changes might help treat depression. When a change occurs, clinical psychologists work with patients to recover from the depressive spell and return to their hedonic set point more quickly. Because acts of kindness often promote long-term well-being, one treatment method is to provide patients with different altruistic activities that can help a person raise his or her hedonic set point.

=== Resilience research ===
Hedonic adaptation is also relevant to resilience research. Resilience is a "class of phenomena characterized by patterns of positive adaptation in the context of significant adversity or risk," meaning resilience is largely the ability to remain at one's hedonic setpoint while going through negative experiences. Psychologists have identified various factors that contribute to a person being resilient, such as positive attachment relationships (see Attachment Theory), positive self-perceptions, self-regulatory skills (see Emotional self-regulation), ties to prosocial organizations (see prosocial behavior), and a positive outlook on life.

=== Transhumanism ===
Transhumanist philosophers such as David Pearce and Mark Alan Walker have argued that future technologies will eventually make it feasible to overcome the hedonic treadmill. Walker coined the term "biohappiness" to describe the idea of directly manipulating the biological roots of happiness in order to increase it. Pearce argues that suffering could eventually be eradicated entirely, stating that: "It is predicted that the world's last unpleasant experience will be a precisely dateable event." Proposed technological methods of overcoming the hedonic treadmill include wireheading (direct brain stimulation for uniform bliss), which undermines motivation and evolutionary fitness; designer drugs, offering sustainable well-being without side effects, though impractical for lifelong reliance; and genetic engineering. Genetic recalibration through hyperthymia-promoting genes could raise hedonic set-points, fostering adaptive well-being, creativity, and productivity while maintaining responsiveness to stimuli. While scientifically achievable, this transformation requires careful ethical and societal considerations to navigate its profound implications.

== Critical views ==
Individuals' set point may merely be a genetic tendency not a heritable criterion for happiness. In a study on moderate to excessive drug intake in rats, Ahmed and Koob (1998) sought to demonstrate that the use of mind-altering drugs such as cocaine could change an individual's hedonic set point. Their findings suggest that drug usage and addiction lead to neurochemical adaptations whereby a person needs more of that substance to feel the same levels of pleasure. Thus, drug abuse can have lasting impacts on one's hedonic set point, both in terms of overall happiness and with regard to pleasure felt from drug usage.

Genetic roots of the hedonic set point are also disputed. Sosis (2014) has argued the "hedonic treadmill" interpretation of twin studies depends on dubious assumptions. Pairs of identical twins raised apart are not necessarily raised in substantially different environments. The similarities between twins (such as intelligence or beauty) may invoke similar reactions from the environment. Thus, we might see notable similarity in happiness levels between twins even though no happiness genes govern affect levels.

Hedonic adaptation may be more common with positive events as opposed to negative ones. Negativity bias, where people tend to focus more on negative emotions than positive emotions, can be an obstacle in raising one's happiness set point. Negative emotions often require more attention and are generally remembered better, overshadowing any positive experiences that may even outnumber negative experiences. Given that negative events hold more psychological power than positive ones, it may be difficult to create lasting positive change.

Headey (2008) concluded that an internal locus of control and having "positive" personality traits (notably low neuroticism) are the two most significant factors affecting one's subjective well-being. Headey also found that adopting "non-zero sum" goals, those which enrich one's relationships with others and with society as a whole (i.e., family-oriented and altruistic goals), increase the level of subjective well-being. Conversely, attaching importance to zero-sum life goals (career success, wealth, and social status) have a small but statistically significant negative impact on people's overall subjective well-being (even though the size of a household's disposable income does have a small, positive impact on subjective well-being). Duration of one's education seems to have no direct bearing on life satisfaction. And, contradicting set point theory, Headey found no return to homeostasis after sustaining a disability or developing a chronic illness. These disabling events are permanent, and thus according to the cognitive model of depression, may contribute to depressive thoughts and increase neuroticism (another factor found by Headey to diminish subjective well-being). Disability appears to be the single most important factor affecting human subjective well-being. The impact of disability on subjective well-being is almost twice as large as that of the second strongest factor affecting life satisfaction -— the personality trait of neuroticism.

== See also ==
- Diderot effect
- Happiness economics
- Illusion of control
- Induced demand
- Lifestyle creep
- Novelty bias
- Positive psychology
- Positivity offset
- Satisfaction paradox
- Tocqueville effect
