= Easterling (surname) =

Easterling is an English surname. Notable people with the surname include:

- Addison Rae Easterling (born 2000), American musician and social media personality
- Howard Easterling (1911–1993), American baseball player
- Keller Easterling, American architect
- P. E. Easterling (born 1934), English classical scholar
- Paul Easterling (1905–1993), American baseball player
- Ray Easterling (1949–2012), American football player
- Ruth M. Easterling (1910–2006), American politician
- William Easterling (born 1953), American professor

== See also ==
- Easterlin
