= Happiness economics =

Study of happiness and quality of life

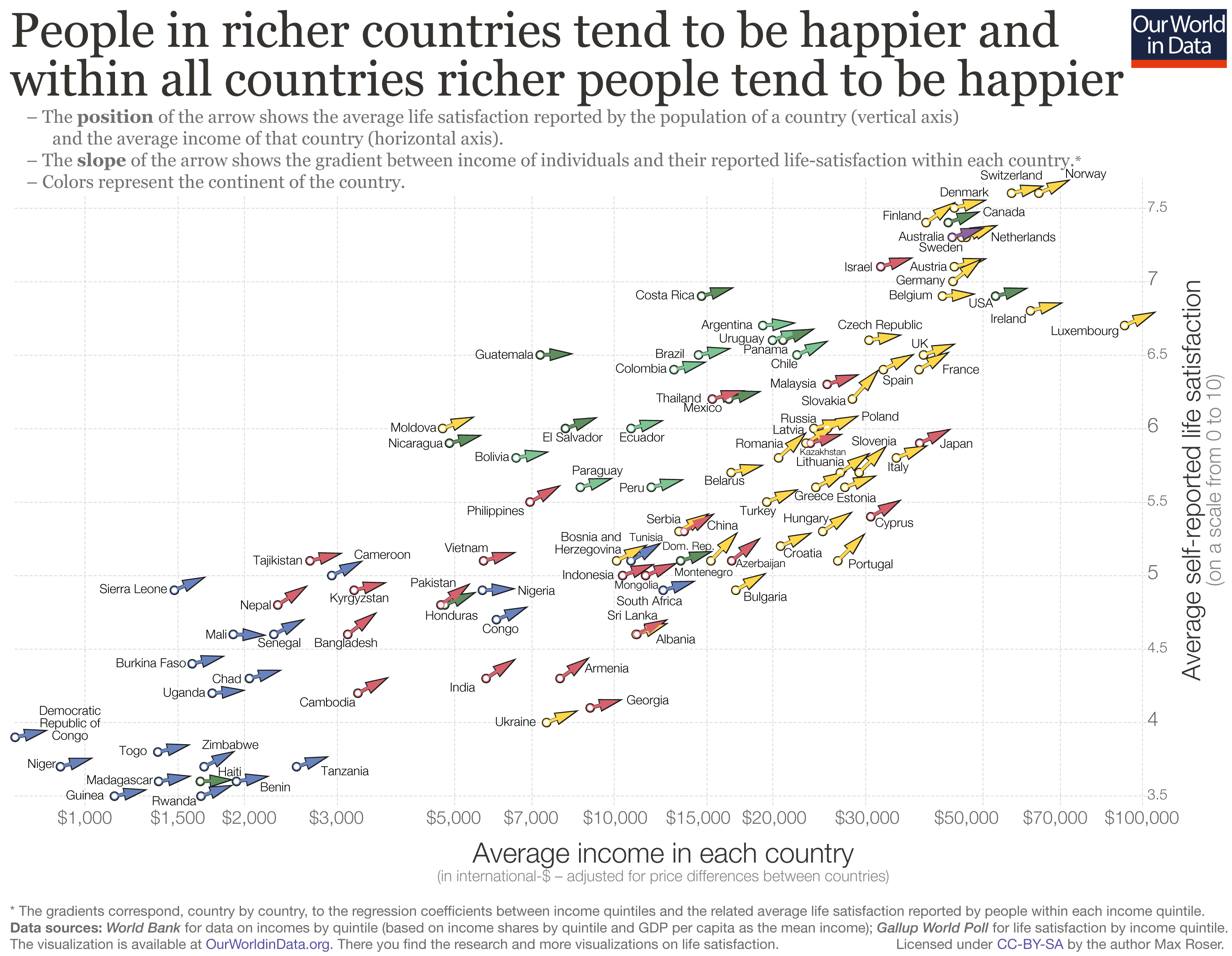
Richer countries tend to be happier than poorer countries (observations are lined up around an upward-sloping trend), and richer people within countries tend to be happier than poorer people in the same countries (arrows are consistently pointing northeast).

The economics of happiness or happiness economics is the theoretical, qualitative and quantitative study of happiness and quality of life, including positive and negative affects, well-being, life satisfaction and related concepts – typically tying economics more closely than usual with other social sciences, like sociology and psychology, as well as physical health. It typically treats subjective happiness-related measures, as well as more objective quality of life indices, rather than wealth, income or profit, as something to be maximized.

The field has grown substantially since the late 20th century, for example by the development of methods, surveys and indices to measure happiness and related concepts, as well as quality of life. Happiness findings have been described as a challenge to the theory and practice of economics. Nevertheless, furthering gross national happiness, as well as a specified Index to measure it, has been adopted explicitly in the Constitution of Bhutan in 2008, to guide its economic governance.

== Subject classifications ==
The subject may be categorized in various ways, depending on specificity, intersection, and cross-classification. For example, within the Journal of Economic Literature classification codes, it has been categorized under:

- Welfare economics at JEL: D63 – Equity, Justice, Inequality, and Other Normative Criteria and Measurement
- Health, education, and welfare at JEL: I31 – General Welfare; Basic needs; Living standards; Quality of life; Happiness
- Demographic economics at JEL:J18 – Public policy.

== Metrology ==
Given its very nature, reported happiness is subjective. It is difficult to compare one person's happiness with another's. It can be especially difficult to compare happiness across cultures. However, many happiness economists believe they have solved this comparison problem. Cross-sections of large data samples across nations and time demonstrate consistent patterns in the determinants of happiness.

Happiness is typically measured using subjective measures – e.g. self-reported surveys – and/or objective measures. One concern has always been the accuracy and reliability of people's responses to happiness surveys. Objective measures such as lifespan, income, and education are often used as well as or instead of subjectively reported happiness, though this assumes that they generally produce happiness, which while plausible may not necessarily be the case. The terms quality of life or well-being are often used to encompass these more objective measures.

Micro-econometric happiness equations have the standard form: $W_{it} = \alpha + \beta{x_{it}} + \epsilon_{it}$. In this equation $W$ is the reported well-being of individual $i$ at time $t$, and $x$ is a vector of known variables, which include socio-demographic and socioeconomic characteristics.

Macro-econometric happiness has been gauged by some as Gross National Happiness, following Sicco Mansholt's 1972 introduction of the measure, and by others as a Genuine Wealth index. Anielski in 2008 wrote a reference definition on how to measure five types of capital: (1) human; (2) social; (3) natural; (4) built; and (5) financial.

Happiness, well-being, or satisfaction with life, was seen as unmeasurable in classical and neo-classical economics. Van Praag was the first person who organized large surveys in order to explicitly measure welfare derived from income. He did this with the Income Evaluation Question (IEQ). This approach is called the Leyden School. It is named after the Dutch university where this approach was developed. Other researchers included Arie Kapteyn and Aldi Hagenaars.

Some scientists claim that happiness can be measured both subjectively and objectively by observing the joy center of the brain lit up with advanced imaging, although this raises philosophical issues, for example about whether this can be treated as more reliable than reported subjective happiness.

== Determinants ==
=== GDP and GNP ===
Typically national financial measures, such as gross domestic product (GDP) and gross national product (GNP), have been used as a measure of successful policy. There is a significant association between GDP and happiness, with citizens in wealthier nations being happier than those in poorer nations. In 2002, researchers argued that this relationship extends only to an average GDP per capita of about $15,000. In the 2000s, several studies have obtained the opposite result, so this Easterlin paradox is controversial.

=== Individual income ===
Historically, economists have said that well-being is a simple function of income. However, it has been found that once wealth reaches a subsistence level, its effectiveness as a generator of well-being is greatly diminished. Happiness economists hope to change the way governments view well-being and how to most effectively govern and allocate resources given this paradox.

In 2010, Daniel Kahneman and Angus Deaton found that higher earners generally reported better life satisfaction, but people's day-to-day emotional well-being only rose with earnings until a threshold annual household pre-tax income of $75,000. This particular study by Kahneman and Deaton showed the relationship between experienced happiness and the maximum amount of income at $75,000. Experienced happiness is the happiness received on a daily basis-"the frequency and intensity of experiences of joy, fascination, anxiety, sadness, anger, and affection that make one's life pleasant or unpleasant." The other finding from Kahneman and Deaton is there is no evidence supporting a maximum income to what is called reflective happiness. This data is supported by the use of the Cantrill Ladder, which revealed that there is a direct relationship between income and reflective happiness. This can conclude, to a point, that money does buy happiness.

Other factors have been suggested as making people happier than money. A short term course of psychological therapy is 32 times more cost effective at increasing happiness than simply increasing income.

Scholars at the University of Virginia, University of British Columbia and Harvard University released a study in 2011 after examining numerous academic papers in response to an apparent contradiction: "When asked to take stock of their lives, people with more money report being a good deal more satisfied. But when asked how happy they are at the moment, people with more money are barely different than those with less." The study included the following eight general recommendations:

- Spend money on "experiences" rather than goods.
- Donate money to others, including charities, rather than spending it solely on oneself.
- Spend small amounts of money on many small, temporary pleasures rather than less often on larger ones.
- Don't spend money on "extended warranties and other forms of overpriced insurance."
- Adjust one's mindset to "pay now, consume later," instead of "consume now, pay later."
- Exercise circumspection about the day-to-day consequences of a purchase beforehand.
- Rather than buying products that provide the "best deal," make purchases based on what will facilitate well-being.
- Seek out the opinions of other people who have prior experience of a product before purchasing it.

In their "Unhappy Cities" paper, Edward Glaeser, Joshua Gottlieb and Oren Ziv examined the self-reported subjective well-being of people living in American metropolitan areas, particularly in relation to the notion that "individuals make trade-offs among competing objectives, including but not limited to happiness." The researchers findings revealed that people living in metropolitan areas where lower levels of happiness are reported are receiving higher real wages, and they suggest in their conclusion that "humans are quite understandably willing to sacrifice both happiness and life satisfaction if the price is right."

=== Social security ===
Ruut Veenhoven claimed that social security payments do not seem to add to happiness. This may be due to the fact that non-self-earned income (e.g., from a lottery) does not add to happiness in general either. Happiness may be the mind's reward for a useful action. However, Johan Norberg of Centre for Independent Studies, a free enterprise economy think tank, presents a hypothesis that as people who think that they themselves control their lives are happier, paternalist institutions may decrease happiness.

An alternative perspective focuses on the role of the welfare state as an institution that improves quality of life not only by increasing the extent to which basic human needs are met, but also by promoting greater control of one's life by limiting the degree to which individuals find themselves at the mercy of impersonal market forces that are indifferent to the fate of individuals. This is the argument suggested by the U.S. political scientist Benjamin Radcliff, who has presented a series of papers in peer-reviewed scholarly journals demonstrating that a more generous welfare state contributes to higher levels of life satisfaction, and does so to rich and poor alike.

=== Employment ===
Generally, the well-being of those who are employed is higher than those who are unemployed. Employment itself may not increase subjective well-being, but facilitates activities that do (such as supporting a family, philanthropy, and education). While work does increase well-being through providing income, income level is not as indicative of subjective well-being as other benefits related to employment. Feelings of autonomy and mastery, found in higher levels in the employed than unemployed, are stronger predictors of subjective well-being than wealth.

When personal preference and the amount of time spent working do not align, both men and women experience a decrease in subjective well-being. The negative effect of working more or working less than preferred has been found across multiple studies, most finding that working more than preferred (over-employed) is more detrimental, but some found that working less (under-employed) is more detrimental. Most individuals' levels of subjective well-being returned to "normal" (level previous to time mismatch) within one year. Levels remained lower only when individuals worked more hours than preferred for a period of two years or more, which may indicate that it is more detrimental to be over-employed than under-employed in the long-term.

Employment status effects are not confined to the individual. Being unemployed can have detrimental effects on a spouse's subjective well-being, compared to being employed or not working (and not looking for work). Partner life satisfaction is inversely related to the number of hours their partner is underemployed. When both partners are underemployed, the life-satisfaction of men is more greatly diminished than women. However, just being in a relationship reduces the impact unemployment has on the subjective well-being of an individual. On a broad scale, high rates of unemployment negatively affect the subjective well-being of the employed.

Becoming self-employed can increase subjective well-being, given the right conditions. Those who leave work to become self-employed report greater life satisfaction than those who work for others or become self-employed after unemployment; this effect increases over time. Those who are self-employed and have employees of their own report higher life-satisfaction than those who are self-employed without employees, and women who are self-employed without employees report a higher life satisfaction than men in the same condition.

The effects of retirement on subjective well-being vary depending on personal and cultural factors. Subjective well-being can remain stable for those who retire from work voluntarily, but declines for those who are involuntarily retired. In countries with an average social norm to work, the well-being of men increases after retirement, and the well-being of retired women is at the same level as women who are homemakers or work outside the home. In countries with a strong social norm to work, retirement negatively impacts the well-being of men and women.

=== Relationships and children ===
In the 1970s, women typically reported higher subjective well-being than did men. By 2009, declines in reported female happiness had eroded a gender gap.

In rich societies, where a rise in income doesn't equate to an increase in levels of subjective well-being, personal relationships are the determining factors of happiness.

Glaeser, Gottlieb and Ziv suggest in their conclusion that the happiness trade-offs that individuals seem willing to make aligns with the tendency of parents to report less happiness, as they sacrifice their personal well-being for the "price" of having children.

=== Freedom and control ===
There is a significant correlation between feeling in control of one's own life and happiness levels.

A study conducted at the University of Zurich suggested that democracy and federalism bring well-being to individuals. It concluded that the more direct political participation possibilities available to citizens raises their subjective well-being. Two reasons were given for this finding. First, a more active role for citizens enables better monitoring of professional politicians by citizens, which leads to greater satisfaction with government output. Second, the ability for citizens to get involved in and have control over the political process, independently increases well-being.

American psychologist Barry Schwartz argues in his book The Paradox of Choice that too many consumer and lifestyle choices can produce anxiety and unhappiness due to analysis paralysis and raised expectations of satisfaction.

=== Religious diversity ===
National cross-sectional data suggest an inverse relationship between religious diversity and happiness, possibly by facilitating more bonding (and less bridging) social capital.

=== Happiness and leisure ===
Much of the research regarding happiness and leisure relies on subjective well-being (SWB) as an appropriate measure of happiness. Research has demonstrated a wide variety of contributing and resulting factors in the relationship between leisure and happiness. These include psychological mechanisms, and the types and characteristics of leisure activities that result in the greatest levels of subjective happiness. Specifically, leisure may trigger five core psychological mechanisms including detachment-recovery from work, autonomy in leisure, mastery of leisure activities, meaning-making in leisure activities, and social affiliation in leisure (DRAMMA). Leisure activities that are physical, relational, and performed outdoors are correlated with greater feelings of satisfaction with free time. Research across 33 different countries shows that individuals who feel they strengthen social relationships and work on personal development during leisure time are happier than others. Furthermore, shopping, reading books, attending cultural events, getting together with relatives, listening to music and attending sporting events is associated with higher levels of happiness. Spending time on the internet or watching TV is not associated with higher levels of happiness as compared to these other activities.

Research has shown that culture influences how we measure happiness and leisure. While SWB is a commonly used measure of happiness in North America and Europe, this may not be the case internationally. Quality of life (QOL) may be a better measure of happiness and leisure in Asian countries, especially Korea. Countries such as China and Japan may require a different measurement of happiness, as societal differences may influence the concept of happiness (i.e. economic variables, cultural practices, and social networks) beyond what QOL is able to measure. There seem to be some differences in leisure preference cross-culturally. Within the Croatian culture, family related leisure activities may enhance SWB across a large spectrum of ages ranging from adolescent to older adults, in both women and men. Active socializing and visiting cultural events are also associated with high levels of SWB across varying age and gender. Italians seem to prefer social conceptions of leisure as opposed to individualistic conceptions. Although different groups of individuals may prefer varying types and amount of leisure activity, this variability is likely due to the differing motivations and goals that an individual intends to fulfill with their leisure time.

Research suggests that specific leisure interventions enhance feelings of SWB. This is both a top-down and bottom-up effect, in that leisure satisfaction causally affects SWB, and SWB causally affects leisure satisfaction. This bi-directional effect is stronger in retired individuals than in working individuals. Furthermore, it appears that satisfaction with our leisure at least partially explains the relationship between our engagement in leisure and our SWB. Broadly speaking, researchers classify leisure into active (e.g. volunteering, socializing, sports and fitness) and passive leisure (e.g. watching television and listening to the radio). Among older adults, passive leisure activities and personal leisure activities (e.g. sleeping, eating, and bathing) correlate with higher levels of SWB and feelings of relaxation than active leisure activities. Thus, although significant evidence has demonstrated that active leisure is associated with higher levels of SWB, or happiness, this may not be the case with older populations.

Both regular and irregular involvement in sports leisure can result in heightened SWB. Serious, or systematic involvement in certain leisure activities, such as taekwondo, correlates with personal growth and a sense of happiness. Additionally, more irregular (e.g. seasonal) sports activities, such as skiing, are also correlated with high SWB. Furthermore, the relationship between pleasure and skiing is thought to be caused in part by a sense of flow and involvement with the activity. Leisure activities, such as meeting with friends, participating in sports, and going on vacation trips, positively correlate with life satisfaction. It may also be true that going on a vacation makes our lives seem better, but does not necessarily make us happier in the long term. Research regarding vacationing or taking a holiday trip is mixed. Although the reported effects are mostly small, some evidence points to higher levels of SWB, or happiness, after taking a holiday.

=== Economic security ===
Poverty alleviation is associated with happier populations. According to the latest systematic review of the economic literature on life satisfaction: Volatile or high inflation is bad for a population's well-being, particularly those with a right-wing political orientation. That suggests the impact of disruptions to economic security are in part mediated or modified by beliefs about economic security.

=== Political stability ===
The Voxeu analysis of the economic determinants of happiness found that life satisfaction explains the largest share of an existing government's vote share, followed by economic growth, which itself explains six times as much as employment and twice as much as inflation.

=== Economic freedom ===
Individualistic societies have happier populations. Institutes of economic freedom are associated with increases wealth inequality but does not necessarily contribute to decreases in aggregate well-being or subjective well-being at the population level. In fact, income inequality enhances global well-being. There is some debate over whether living in poor neighbours make one happier. And, living among rich neighbours can dull the happiness that comes from wealth. This is purported to work by way of an upward or downward comparison effect (Keeping up with the Joneses). The balance of evidence is trending in favour of the hypothesis that living in poor neighbourhoods makes one less happy, and living in rich neighbourhoods actually makes one happier, in the United States. While social status matters, a balance of factors like amenities, safe areas, well maintained housing, turn the tide in favour of the argument that richer neighbours are happier neighbours.

=== Democracy ===
"The right to participate in the political process, measured by the extent of direct democratic rights across regions, is strongly correlated with subjective well-being (Frey and Stutzer, 2002) ... a potential mechanism that explains this relationship is the perception of procedural fairness and social mobility." Institutions and well-being, democracy and federalism are associated with a happier population. Correspondingly, political engagement and activism have associated health benefits. On the other hand, some non-democratic countries such as China and Saudi Arabia top the Ipsos list of countries where the citizenry is most happy with their government's direction. That suggests that voting preferences may not translate well into overall satisfaction with the government's direction. In any case, both of these factors revealed preference and domain specific satisfaction rather than overall subjective well being.

=== Economic development ===
Historically, economists thought economic growth was unrelated to population level well-being, a phenomenon labelled the Easterlin paradox. More robust research has identified that there is a link between economic development and the wellbeing of the population. A <2017 meta-analysis shows that the impact of infrastructure expenditure on economic growth varies considerably. So, one cannot assume an infrastructure project will yield welfare benefits. The paper doesn't investigate or elaborate on any modifiable variables that might predict the value of a project. However, government spending on roads and primary industries is the best value target for transport spending, according to a 2013 meta-analysis. 7%+/−3% per annum discount rates are typically applied as the discount rate on public infrastructure projects in Australia. Smaller real discount rates are used internationally to calculate the social return on investment by governments.

=== Happiness and social media ===
The expansion of social media has raised concerns about its effects on subjective well-being. Evidence from Latin America suggests a negative relationship. Using an instrumental variables approach based on internet access quality, Caravaggio (2025) finds a causal negative effect of social media use on subjective well-being, which becomes stronger over time and is particularly pronounced among women and residents of large cities.

Recent research has also focused on the effects of social media on younger populations. Haidt and Rausch argue that the rapid diffusion of social media has contributed to declining adolescent well-being, through mechanisms including social comparison, reduced face-to-face interaction, and the displacement of activities important for healthy development. Haidt develops these arguments further in The Anxious Generation, emphasizing the transition from a play-based childhood to a phone-based childhood as a potential source of declining youth well-being.

=== Happiness and income inequality ===
Income inequality is another potential determinant of subjective well-being. Recent evidence for Latin America finds a negative relationship between local income inequality and happiness. Caravaggio (2026) uses satellite images and deep neural networks to construct an objective measure of local inequality for more than one thousand urban agglomerations in Latin America. The results show a statistically significant negative association between local inequality and subjective well-being, particularly when inequality is measured within an approximately 10-kilometer radius, suggesting that local environments are relevant for social comparisons.

The literature suggests that social comparisons may be an important mechanism linking inequality to happiness. Cheung and Lucas (2016), using data from more than 1.7 million individuals across 2,425 U.S. counties, find that higher income inequality strengthens the association between relative income and life satisfaction, consistent with stronger social comparison effects in more unequal environments. However, the overall evidence remains heterogeneous: a systematic review and meta-analysis by Ngamaba, Panagioti and Armitage (2018) finds that the aggregate relationship between income inequality and subjective well-being is weak and depends on contextual factors such as the level of economic development.

== Alternative approach: economic consequences of happiness ==
While the mainstream happiness economics has focused on identifying the determinants of happiness, an alternative approach in the discipline examines instead what are the economic consequences of happiness. Happiness may act as a determinant of economic outcomes: it increases productivity, predicts one's future income and affects labour market performance. There is a growing number of studies justifying the so-called "happy-productive worker" thesis. The positive and causal impact of happiness on an individual's productivity has been established in experimental studies. Happiness can affect voting for the incumbent party. Research in political science and behavioral economics suggests that voters' subjective well-being, or happiness, often influences their political decisions, including whether to support the incumbent party, independently from the effect mediated by the economic individual conditions.

== Related studies ==
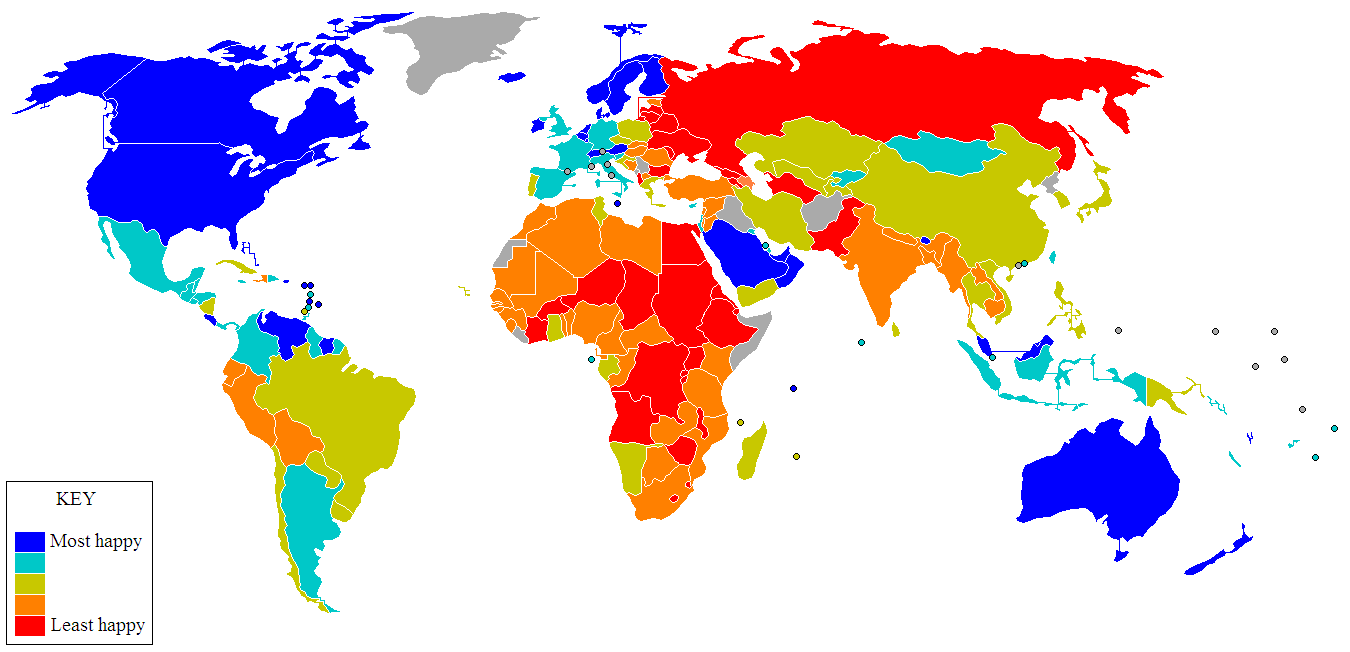
The Satisfaction with Life Index. Blue through red represent most to least happy respectively; grey areas have no reliable data available.

The Satisfaction with Life Index is an attempt to show the average self-reported happiness in different nations. This is an example of a recent trend to use direct measures of happiness, such as surveys asking people how happy they are, as an alternative to traditional measures of policy success such as GDP or GNP. Some studies suggest that happiness can be measured effectively. The Inter-American Development Bank (IDB), published in November 2008 a major study on happiness economics in Latin America and the Caribbean.

There are also several examples of measures that include self-reported happiness as one variable. Happy Life Years, a concept brought by Dutch sociologist Ruut Veenhoven, combines self-reported happiness with life expectancy. The Happy Planet Index combines it with life expectancy and ecological footprint.

Gross National Happiness (GNH) is a concept introduced by the King of Bhutan in 1972 as an alternative to GDP. Several countries have already developed or are in the process of developing such an index. Bhutan's index has led that country to limit the amount of deforestation it will allow and to require that all tourists to its nation must spend US$200.

After the military coup of 2006, Thailand also instituted an index. The stated promise of the new Prime Minister Surayud Chulanont is to make the Thai people not only richer but happier as well. Much like GDP results, Thailand releases monthly GNH data. The Thai GNH index is based on a 1–10 scale with 10 being the happiest. As of 13 May 2007, the Thai GNH measured 5.1 points. The index uses poll data from the population surveying various satisfaction factors such as security, public utilities, good governance, trade, social justice, allocation of resources, education and community problems.

Australia, China, France and the United Kingdom are also coming up with indexes to measure national happiness. The UK began to measure national wellbeing in 2012. North Korea also announced an international Happiness Index in 2011 through Korean Central Television. North Korea itself came in second, behind #1 China. Canada released the Canadian Index of Wellbeing (CIW) in 2011 to track changes in wellbeing. The CIW has adopted the following working definition of wellbeing: The presence of the highest possible quality of life in its full breadth of expression focused on but not necessarily exclusive to good living standards, robust health, a sustainable environment, vital communities, an educated populace, balanced time use, high levels of democratic participation, and access to and participation in leisure and culture

Ecuador's and Bolivia's new constitutions state the indigenous concept of "good life" ("buen vivir" in Spanish, "sumak kawsay" in Quichua, and "suma qamaña" in Aymara) as the goal of sustainable development.

== Neoclassical economics ==
Neoclassical, as well as classical economics, are not subsumed under the term happiness economics although the original goal was to increase the happiness of the people. Classical and neoclassical economics are stages in the development of welfare economics and are characterized by mathematical modeling. Happiness economics represents a radical break with this tradition. The measurement of subjective happiness respectively life satisfaction by means of survey research across nations and time (in addition to objective measures like lifespan, wealth, security etc.) marks the beginning of happiness economics.

== Criticism ==
Some have suggested that establishing happiness as a metric is only meant to serve political goals. Recently there has been concern that happiness research could be used to advance authoritarian aims. As a result, some participants at a happiness conference in Rome have suggested that happiness research should not be used as a matter of public policy but rather used to inform individuals.

Even on the individual level, there is discussion on how much effect external forces can have on happiness. Less than 3% of an individual's level of happiness comes from external sources such as employment, education level, marital status, and socioeconomic status. To go along with this, four of the Big Five Personality Traits are substantially associated with life satisfaction, openness to experience is not associated. Having high levels of internal locus of control leads to higher reported levels of happiness.

Even when happiness can be affected by external sources, it has high hedonic adaptation, some specific events such as an increase in income, disability, unemployment, and loss (bereavement) only have short-term (about a year) effects on a person's overall happiness and after a while happiness may return to levels similar to unaffected peers.

What has the most influence over happiness are internal factors such as genetics, personality traits, and internal locus of control. It is theorized that 50% of the variation in happiness levels is from genetic sources and is known as the genetic set point. The genetic set point is assumed to be stable over time, fixed, and immune to influence or control. This goes along with findings that well-being surveys have a naturally positive baseline.

With such strong internal forces on happiness, it is hard to have an effect on a person's happiness externally. This in turn lends itself back to the idea that establishing a happiness metric is only for political gain and has little other use. To support this even further it is believed that a country aggregate level of SWB can account for more variance in government vote share than standard macroeconomic variables, such as income and employment.

=== Technical issues ===
According to Bond and Lang (2018), the results are skewed due to the fact that the respondents have to "round" their true happiness to the scale of, e.g., 3 or 7 alternatives (e.g., very happy, pretty happy, not too happy). This "rounding error" may cause a less happy group seem happier, in the average. This would not be the case if the happiness of both groups would be normally distributed with the same variance, but that is usually not the case, based on their results. For some not-implausible log-normal assumptions on the scale, typical results can be reversed to the opposite results.

They also show that the "reporting function" seems to be different for different groups and even for the same individual at different times. For example, when a person becomes disabled, they soon start to lower their threshold for a given answer (e.g., "pretty happy"). That is, they give a higher answer than they would have given at the same happiness state before becoming disabled.

== See also ==
- Affective forecasting
- Broad measures of economic progress
- Common Good Economics
- Disability-adjusted life year
- Economic inequality
- Gross National Happiness
- Gross National Well-being
- Gender Development Index
- Happiness at work
- Humanistic economics
- Legatum Prosperity Index
- OECD Better Life Index
- Progressive utilization theory
- Psychometrics
- Quality of life
- Relative deprivation
- Social inequality
- Subjective well-being
- Uneconomic growth
- Well-being
- Well-being contributing factors
- World Happiness Report – annual (UN)
- World Values Survey
- Work-life balance

=== Researchers ===
- Richard Easterlin
- Bruno Frey
- Med Jones
- Richard Layard
- Nic Marks
- Jan-Emmanuel De Neve
- Caravaggio Leonardo A.
- Andrew Oswald
- Bernard van Praag
- Benjamin Radcliff
- Ruut Veenhoven

== Bibliography ==
Books

- Anielski, Mark (2007). The Economics of Happiness: Building Genuine Wealth. Canada: New Society Publishers. p. 288. ISBN 978-0-86571-596-7.
- Bruni, Luigino; Pier Luigi Porta (2005). Economics and Happiness: Framing the Analysis. Oxford University Press. p. 384. ISBN 978-0-19-928628-7.
- Bruni, Luigino (2008). Pier Luigi Porta (ed.). Handbook On the Economics Of Happiness. Edward Elgar Publishing. p. 640. ISBN 978-1-84376-826-5. – preview.
- Gaucher, Renaud (2009). Bonheur et économie. Le capitalisme est-il soluble dans la recherche du bonheur? L'Harmattan, collection L'esprit économique. ISBN 978-2296069169
- Van Praag, Bernard; Ada Ferrer-i-Carbonell (2004). Happiness Quantified: A Satisfaction Calculus Approach. Oxford University Press. p. 352. ISBN 978-0-19-828654-7.
- Kahneman, Daniel; Ed Diener (2003). Well-being: the foundations of hedonic psychology. Russell Sage Foundation. ISBN 978-0-87154-423-0.
- Frey, Bruno S.; Alois Stutzer (2002). Happiness and Economics: How the Economy and Institutions Affect Human Well-Being. Princeton University Press. pp. 232. ISBN 978-0-69106-998-2.

Articles

- Clark, Andrew E.; Frijters, Paul; Shields, Michael A. (2008). "Relative Income, Happiness, and Utility: An Explanation for the Easterlin Paradox and Other Puzzles" (PDF). Journal of Economic Literature. 46 (1): 95–144. doi:10.1257/jel.46.1.95. hdl:10419/34701. S2CID 1744957. Archived from the original (PDF) on 29 October 2013.
- Di Tella, Rafael; MacCulloch, Robert J.; Oswald, Andrew J. (2003). "The Macroeconomics of Happiness" (PDF). Review of Economics and Statistics. 85 (4): 809–27. Bibcode:2003RvE&S..85..809T. doi:10.1162/003465303772815745. S2CID 1914665.
- Easterlin, Richard A. (2004). "The Economics of Happiness". Dædalus. 133 (2): 26–33. doi:10.1162/001152604323049361. JSTOR 20027910. S2CID 57563766. The entire issue of Daedalus is devoted to happiness and may repay exploration.
- Frey, Bruno S.; Stutzer, Alois (2002). "What Can Economists Learn from Happiness Research?" (PDF). Journal of Economic Literature. 40 (2): 402–35. doi:10.1257/jel.40.2.402. hdl:20.500.11850/146621.
- MacKerron, George (2012). "Happiness Economics from 35,000 Feet". Journal of Economic Surveys. 26 (4): 705–35. doi:10.1111/j.1467-6419.2010.00672.x. S2CID 153523588.
- Piekałkiewicz, Marcin (2017). "Why do economists study happiness?". The Economic and Labour Relations Review. 28 (3): 361–77. doi:10.1177/1035304617717130. S2CID 157266981.

Caravaggio, Leonardo A. (2025). "Efectos del uso de redes sociales sobre el bienestar subjetivo en Latinoamérica". Revista de Economía del Rosario (in Spanish). 27 (2). doi:10.12804/revistas.urosario.edu.co/economia/a.15552. Caravaggio, Leonardo (2026). "Desigualdad de ingresos local y bienestar subjetivo en Latinoamérica". Revista de Economía del Rosario (in Spanish). doi:10.12804/revistas.urosario.edu.co/economia/a.16048.
