= Standard of living =

Measure of income, comfort and services

Standard of living is the level of income, comforts and services available to an individual, community or society. A contributing factor to an individual's quality of life, standard of living is generally concerned with objective metrics outside an individual's personal control, such as economic, societal, political, and environmental matters. Individuals or groups use the standard of living to evaluate where to live in the world, or when assessing the success of society.

In international law, an "adequate standard of living" was first described in the Universal Declaration of Human Rights and further described in the International Covenant on Economic, Social and Cultural Rights. To evaluate the impact of policy for sustainable development, different disciplines have defined Decent Living Standards in order to evaluate or compare relative living experience.

During much of its use in economics, improvements to standard of living were thought to be directly connected to economic growth, as well as increase amount of energy consumption and other materials. However, the IPCC Sixth Assessment Report found that literature demonstrates that improvements in sustainable development practices as well as changes in technological efficiency and energy production and use, allow for a Decent Living Standard for all people without fossil fuels and ~15.3 GJ per capita by the end of the 21st century. This allows for climate change mitigation by demand reduction as well as other sustainable development practices.

== Right to an adequate standard of living ==
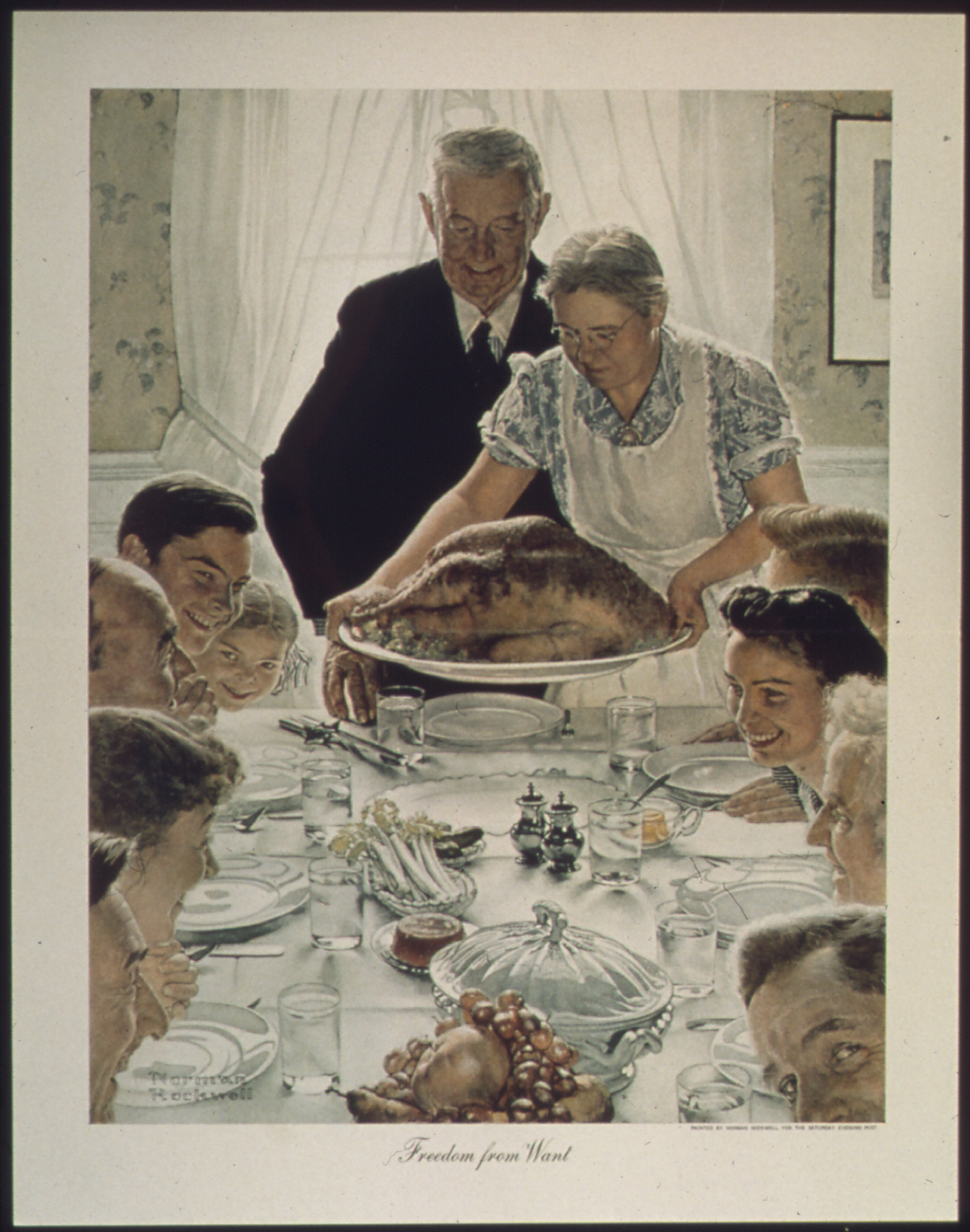
Freedom from Want (1943) by painter Norman Rockwell

The right to an adequate standard of living is listed as part of the Universal Declaration of Human Rights that was accepted by the General Assembly of the United Nations on December 10, 1948.

Everyone has the right to a standard of living adequate for the health and well-being of himself and of his family, including food, clothing, housing and medical care and necessary social services, and the right to security in the event of unemployment, sickness, disability, widowhood, old age or other lack of livelihood in circumstances beyond his control.

— Article 25.1 of the Universal Declaration of Human Rights

The third is freedom from want which, translated into world terms, means economic understandings which will secure to every nation a healthy peacetime life for its inhabitants, everywhere in the world.

— President Franklin D. Roosevelt, January 6, 1941.

== Decent living standard ==
The standard of living varies between individuals depending on different aspects of life. The standard of living consists of the individuals having fundamentals such as access to food, clean water, shelter, social safety (the right to feel secure from harm, harassment and discrimination) and qualitative interaction, which all contribute to their wellbeing and what is considered to be a decent living standard.

Commentators use a number of different measures and approaches to establish the decent living standard (DLS). The decent living standard revolves around the idea and principle that a majority of the population demand the fundamentals that will allow them to have shelter, food and water. These fundamentals can subsist of but are not limited to: Access to affordable housing with an average wage, access to affordable groceries that also have accessible transportation to places that sell groceries, and access to public water infrastructure such as plumbing, tap water, etc. However, these fundamentals are not always able to be maintained for a long period of time.

== Factors considered by scholars ==
Standard of living might be evaluated using a number of characteristics including as the quality and availability of employment, real income, disposable income, class disparity, poverty rate, quality and housing affordability, hours of work required to purchase necessities, gross domestic product, inflation rate, amount of leisure time, access to and quality of healthcare, quality and availability of education, literacy rates, life expectancy, occurrence of diseases, cost of goods and services, infrastructure, access to, quality and affordability of public transportation, national economic growth, economic and political stability, freedom, environmental quality, climate and safety. For the purposes of economics, politics and policy, it is usually compared across time or between groups defined by social, economic or geographical parameters.

Standard of living can be measured by the inflation-adjusted income per person. Due to the income distribution a more representative measure of the median voter living standard is the median income. Other measures such as poverty rate, access and quality of health care, income growth inequality, and educational standards are also used. Examples are access to certain goods (such as the number of refrigerators per 1000 people), or measurement of health such as life expectancy. It is the ease by which people living in a time or place are able to satisfy their needs and/or wants.

There is also the biological standard of living, which pertains to how well the human biological organism fares in its socio-economic environment. It is often measured by the height of a population.

The idea of a 'standard' may be contrasted with the quality of life, which takes into account not only the material standard of living but also other more intangible aspects that make up human life, such as leisure, safety, cultural resources, social life, physical health, environmental quality issues.

Standard of living may be subject to inflation by itself (lifestyle creep or inflation) when more resources are spent on standard of living, or when former luxuries become perceived necessities.

=== Lists ===
- Cost-of-living index
- Disposable household and per capita income
- Housing costs as percentage of gross income
- List of countries by average wage
- List of countries by GDP (PPP) per capita
- List of countries by labour productivity

== See also ==
- Gini coefficient
- GDP per capita
- Housing stress
- Human Development Index
- Income and fertility
- Index of Economic Freedom
- List of countries by Social Progress Index
- Living wage
- Measurable economic welfare
- Right to an adequate standard of living
- Where-to-be-born Index
- Working hours
- Lifestyle creep
