= John Easterlin =

American operatic tenor

John Easterlin is an American operatic tenor who has sung at leading opera houses in the United States and internationally, specialising in character and Spieltenor roles.

== Career ==
Easterlin received his Bachelor of Music degree from the University of Miami and his Bachelor of Science degree from Florida International University, and after a successful career in corporate advertising, began his performing career in musical theatre before moving into opera. He went on to perform at many of America's leading opera houses and festivals, including the Lyric Opera of Chicago, San Francisco Opera, Los Angeles Opera, Seattle Opera, New York City Opera, Dallas Opera, the Opera Company of Philadelphia, the Ravinia Festival with the Chicago Symphony conducted by Daniel Barenboim for the opening night of the Centennial Season, and Spoleto Festival USA in a new production of Ariadne auf Naxos conducted by Emmanual Villaume. He made his debut at the Glimmerglass Opera Festival in the summer of 2009 as 'The Magician' in a new production of Menotti's The Consul. According to Opera News, Easterlin spent 200 hours learning magic tricks for this production, which included producing a live rabbit on stage. Another unusual role for him was Houston Grand Opera's 2006 all-puppet production of Humperdinck's opera Hansel and Gretel in which he sang the role of the Witch as well as operating her twelve-foot high puppet.

Easterlin's debut at the Metropolitan Opera came in 2004 when he appeared in a new production of Richard Strauss' Salome with Karita Mattila, and he has since returned there for productions of Strauss' Der Rosenkavalier (2005), Prokofiev's The Gambler (2008), the revival of Salome (2008) which was also screened on the Metropolitan Opera Live in HD series, Elektra, opposite Susan Bullock and Deborah Voigt (2009) and Khovanshchina and The Makropoulos Case (2012). In 2008 he also performed the role of Jack O'Brien in Kurt Weill's Rise and Fall of the City of Mahagonny with Los Angeles Opera, sharing the stage with Patti LuPone and Audra McDonald, in a production conducted by James Conlon. The performance was recorded for PBS's Great Performances and subsequently released on DVD for the EuroArts label. The recording won two Grammy Awards in 2009, for "Best Classical Album" and "Best Opera Recording".

=== Europe ===
He made his European debut in 2008 as 'The Hunchback' in Die Frau ohne Schatten at the Paris Opera where he returned in 2010 as Squeak in Billy Budd. His other international appearances include his debuts at the Vienna State Opera as Herod in Salome (2009), London's Royal Opera House as Prince Nilsky in a new production of The Gambler (2010) and as The Steersman in "The Flying Dutchman" (2011), the Teatro Real in Madrid and the Bolshoi Theatre in Moscow as Jack O'Brien/Toby Higgins in Rise and Fall of the City of Mahagonny (2010) and (2011), the Teatro Real in Madrid as the Shabby Peasant in "Lady MacBeth of Mtsensk" (2011), and the Canadian Opera Company as Monostatos in Die Zauberflöte and as the Dancing Master and Brighella in "Ariadne auf Naxos" (2011). In previous years, he has appeared as Brighella in Ariadne auf Naxos with the New Israeli Opera in Tel Aviv (2007), The Captain in Wozzeck at Japan's Saito Kinen Festival in a production conducted by Seiji Ozawa (2004), and Pedrillo in Die Entführung aus dem Serail at Opéra de Québec (2003).

The son of a Presbyterian minister, Merrill Lincoln Easterlin, and a committed Christian himself, John Easterlin has appeared as a guest soloist in many churches including Knox Presbyterian Church, in Toronto, Ontario, Canada; the Crystal Cathedral, in California; First Baptist Church, in Dallas, Texas; the First Presbyterian Church, in Orlando, Florida; St. George's United Methodist Church, in Philadelphia, Pennsylvania; and the John Street Methodist Church in New York City, where he sang in the church's first Sunday service following the September 11, 2001 attacks.
