= William Easterling =

William Easterling is a professor of geography and former dean of the Penn State College of Earth and Mineral Sciences. He is currently the assistant director for the Directorate for Geosciences (GEO) at the National Science Foundation.

== Education ==
B.A. Geography and History, University of North Carolina-Chapel Hill, 1976

M.A. Economic Geography, University of North Carolina-Chapel Hill, 1980

PhD. Geography-Climatology, University of North Carolina-Chapel Hill, 1984

High School: Christchurch School in Virginia

== Awards ==
- Fellow American Association for the Advancement of Science
- Wilson Award, Honoring Excellence in Research, April 2003, College of Earth and Mineral Sciences, The Pennsylvania State University.
