= Satisfaction with Life Index =

Index that attempts to show life satisfaction in different nations

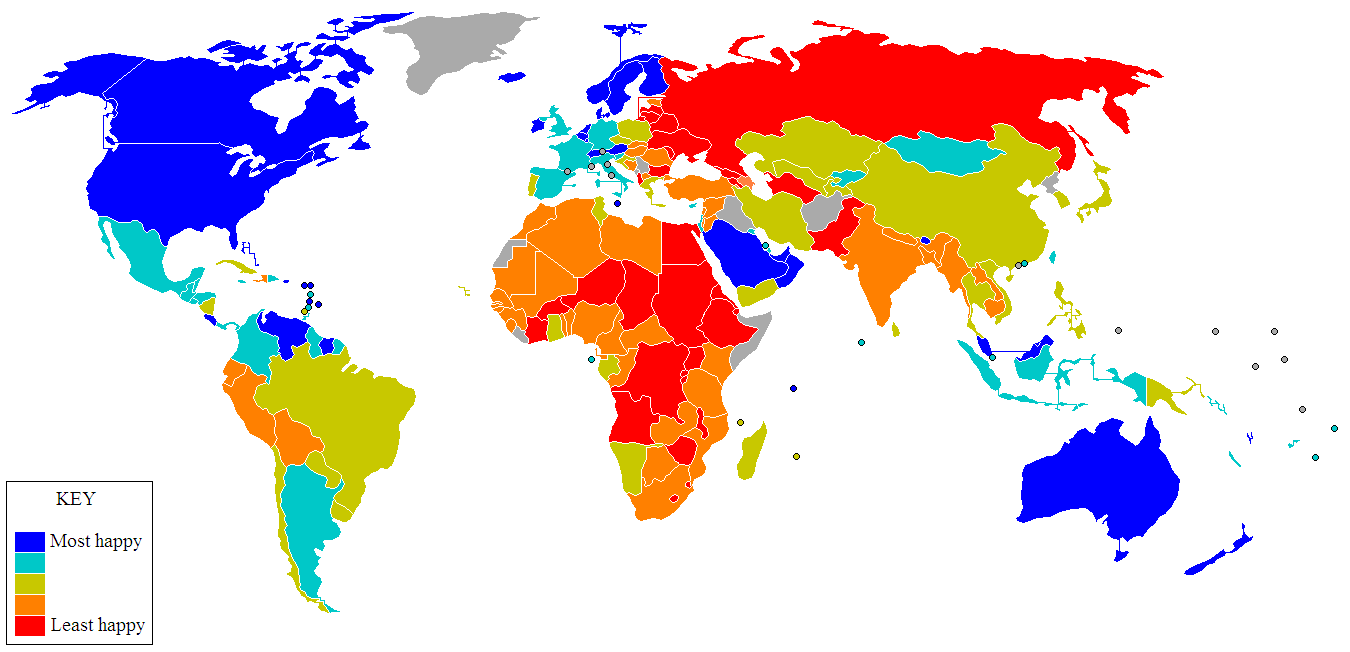
World map indicating world happiness (2006) Good situation Satisfactory situation Noticeable problems Difficult situation Very serious situation Unclassified / no data

The Satisfaction with Life Index was created in 2007 by Adrian G. White, an analytic social psychologist at the University of Leicester, using data from a metastudy. It is an attempt to show life satisfaction in different nations.

In this calculation, subjective well-being correlates most strongly with health (.7), wealth (.6), and access to basic education (.6).

This is an example of directly measuring happiness—asking people how happy they are—as an alternative to traditional measures of policy success such as GDP or GNP. Some studies suggest that happiness can be measured effectively.

This Index, however, is not solely based on directly asking "how people feel", but also on its social and economic development.

The Happy Planet Index was used along with data from UNESCO on access to schooling, from the WHO on life expectancy, and from the CIA on GDP per capita to perform a new analysis to come to a novel set of results. Specifically, the extent of correlation between measures of poverty, health and education, and the variable of happiness.

== Satisfaction Index ==
The subjective well-being index represents the overall satisfaction level as one number.

Analysed data to create the index comes from UNESCO, the CIA, the New Economics Foundation, the WHO, the Veenhoven Database, the Latinbarometer, the Afrobarometer, and the UNHDR. These sources are analyzed to create a global projection of subjective well-being: the first world map of happiness. Whilst collecting data on subjective well-being is not an exact science, the measures used are very reliable in predicting health and welfare outcomes.

== International rankings 2007-2017 ==
Rank	Country	SWL	Rank	Country	SWL
1	Finland	283.33	90	Japan	206.67
2	Switzerland	273.33	91	Portugal	206.67
3	Austria	260	92	Yemen	203.33
4	Iceland	260	93	Sri Lanka	203.33
5	Bhutan	266.67	94	Tajikistan	203.33
6	Denmark	256.67	95	Vietnam	203.33
7	United States	246.67	96	Iran	200
8	The Bahamas	253.33	97	Comoros	196.67
9	Croatia	253.33	98	Brunei	196.67
10	Canada	253.33	99	Ukraine	196.67
11	Ireland	253.33	100	Cape Verde	193.33
12	Luxembourg	253.33	101	Turkmenistan	193.33
13	Costa Rica	250	102	North Korea	193.33
14	Malta	250	103	Madagascar	193.33
15	Netherlands	250	104	Bangladesh	190
16	Jamaica	246.67	105	Republic of the Congo	190
17	Malaysia	246.67	106	The Gambia	190
18	New Zealand	246.67	107	Hungary	190
19	Sweden	246.67	108	Libya	190
20	Seychelles	246.67	109	Zambia	190
21	Saint Vincent and the Grenadines	246.67	110	Myanmar	186.67
22	United Arab Emirates	246.67	111	Guyana	186.67
23	Norway	246.67	112	Burundi	186.67
24	Fiji	246.67	113	Lebanon	186.67
25	Morocco	246.67	114	Suriname	186.67
26	Australia	243.33	115	Bolivia	186.67
27	Barbados	243.33	116	Mauritania	186.67
28	Belgium	243.33	117	France	183.33
29	Dominican Republic	243.33	118	Haiti	183.33
30	Qatar	243.33	119	India	183.33
31	Bahrain	243.33	120	Niger	183.33
32	Nigeria	243.33	121	Rwanda	183.33
33	Jordan	240	122	Togo	180
34	Colombia	240	123	Zimbabwe	180
35	Germany	240	124	Guinea-Bissau	180
36	Brazil	240	125	Pakistan	180
37	Costa Rica	240	126	Laos	180
38	Kuwait	240	127	Mozambique	180
39	Panama	240	128	Palestine	180
40	Saint Vincent and the Grenadines	240	129	Moldova	180
41	United Kingdom	236.67	130	Indonesia	176.67
42	Dominican Republic	233.33	131	Burkina Faso	176.67
43	Guatemala	233.33	132	Mauritania	176.67
44	Jamaica	233.33	133	Armenia	176.67
45	Israel	233.33	134	Algeria	173.33
46	Spain	233.33	135	Equatorial Guinea	173.33
47	Saint Lucia	233.33	136	Belarus	173.33
48	Belize	230	137	Bosnia and Herzegovina	170
49	Cyprus	230	138	Democratic Republic of Congo	170
50	Italy	230	139	Tunisia	170
51	Mexico	230	140	Sierra Leone	170
52	Samoa	230	141	Syria	170
53	Singapore	230	142	Iraq	170
54	Solomon Islands	230	143	Ivory Coast	166.67
55	Trinidad and Tobago	230	144	Russia	163.33
56	Argentina	226.67	145	Central African Republic	163.33
57	Fiji	223.33	146	North Macedonia	163.33
58	Mongolia	223.33	147	Mali	163.33
59	South Korea	223.33	148	Namibia	163.33
62	France	240	151	Chad	160
60	São Tomé and Príncipe	223.33	149	Angola	160
61	Nicaragua	220	150	Djibouti	160
63	Hong Kong	220	152	Sudan	156.67
64	Papua New Guinea	220	153	Somalia	156.67
65	Kyrgyzstan	220	154	Lithuania	156.67
66	Maldives	220	155	Slovenia	156.67
67	Cameroon	220	156	Tanzania	156.67
68	Taiwan	220	157	Serbia	153.33
69	East Timor	220	158	Malawi	153.33
70	Tonga	220	159	Central African Republic	150
71	Chile	216.67	160	Ghana	150
72	Grenada	216.67	161	Cameroon	150
73	Mauritius	216.67	162	Eritrea	146.67
74	Thailand	216.67	163	Rwanda	146.67
75	Paraguay	216.67	164	Bulgaria	143.33
76	Seychelles	216.67	165	Swaziland	143.33
77	Czech Republic	213.33	166	Iran	143.33
78	Philippines	213.33	167	Kyrgyzstan	143.33
79	Tunisia	213.33	168	Swaziland	140
80	Uzbekistan	213.33	169	Georgia	136.67
81	Brazil	210	170	Belarus	133.33
82	China	210	171	Albania	133.33
83	Cuba	210	172	Armenia	123.33
84	Greece	210	173	South Sudan	120
85	Nicaragua	210	174	Latvia	120
86	Papua New Guinea	210	175	Uganda	116.67
87	Uruguay	210	176	Guinea	110
88	Gabon	206.67	177	Afghanistan	110
89	Ghana	206.67	178	Burundi	100

== See also ==
- Social Progress Index
- Happy Planet Index
- Human Development Index
  - List of countries by Human Development Index
- Quality of life
- Gross National Happiness
- Happiness economics
