= Easterlin hypothesis =

The Easterlin hypothesis (Easterlin 1961, 1969, 1973) states that the positive relationship between income and fertility is dependent on relative income. It is considered the first viable and a still leading explanation for mid-twentieth century baby booms.

The hypothesis as formulated by Richard Easterlin presumes that material aspirations are determined by experiences rooted in family background: he assumes first that young couples try to achieve a standard of living equal to or better than they had when they grew up. This is called "relative status". If income is high relative to aspirations and jobs are plentiful, it will be easier to marry young and have more children and still match that standard of living. But when jobs are scarce, couples who try to keep that standard of living will wait to get married and have fewer children. Children are normal goods once this influence of family background is controlled. For Easterlin, the size of the cohort is a critical determinant of how easy it is to get a good job. A small cohort means less competition, a large cohort means more competition to worry about. The assumptions blend economics and sociology.

Easterlin's hypothesis can also be used for further predictions of the fertility rate. Easterlin expected a new fertility boom beginning in the 1980s.
