= Nic Marks =

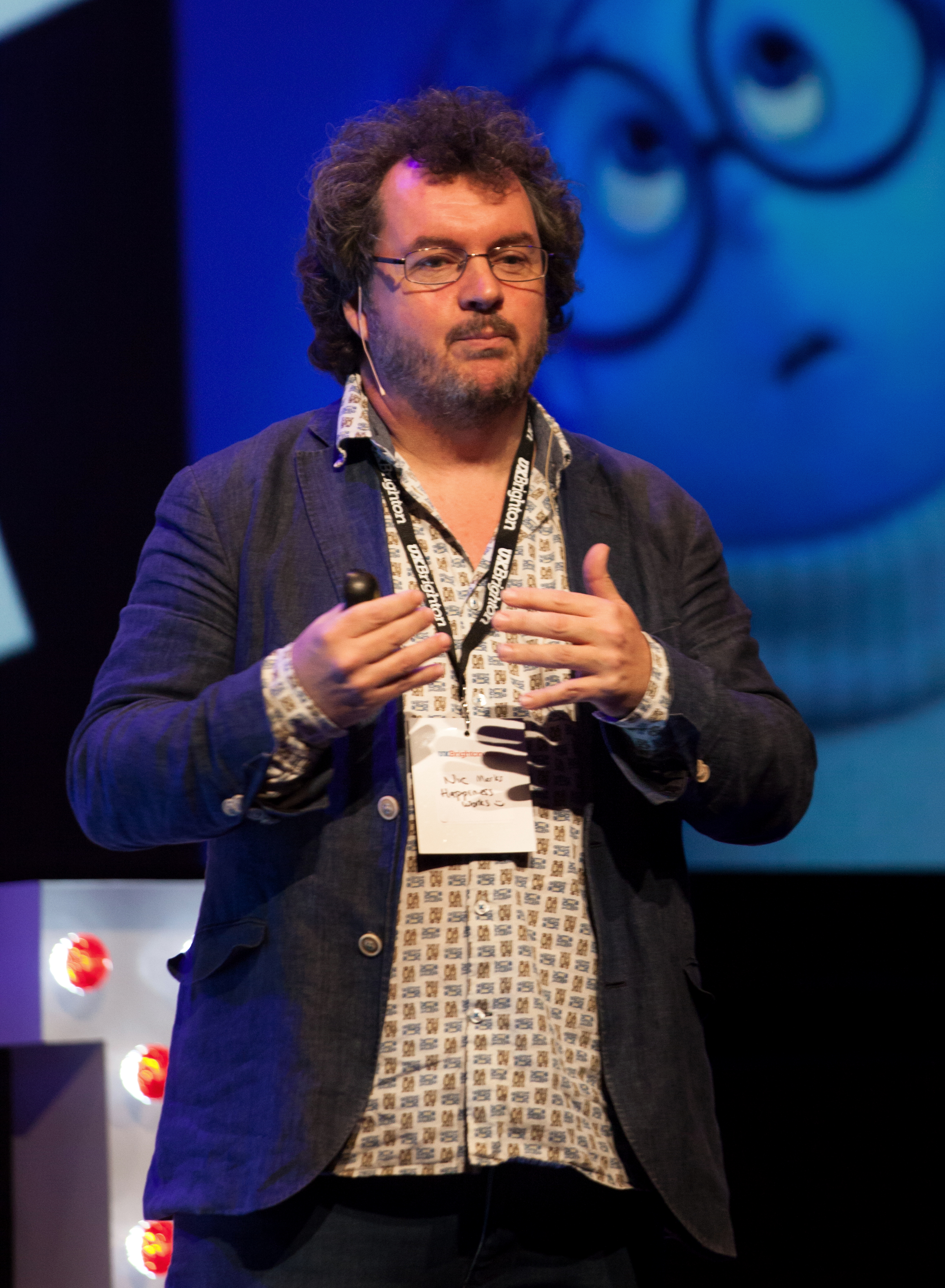
Nic Marks speaking at UX Brighton 2016

Nic Marks is an independent policy adviser, speaker, statistician and author. He is best known for his work on the Happy Planet Index, as a fellow of the New Economics Foundation (NEF) in London. The Happy Planet Index is the first global measure of sustainable well-being which envisions a future where good lives don't have to cost the earth.

== Career ==
Marks is the founder and CEO of Friday Pulse (formerly Happiness Works), an organisation focusing on changing the world of work. He has been featured in publications including the Wall Street Journal, The Guardian, Wired UK, and The Huffington Post. He was voted one of the Top 10 original thinkers in 2011 by Director Magazine and listed on Forbes 7 Most Powerful Ideas in 2011.

Marks's work has led to him being invited to speak, train and host workshops at conferences and events around the world as well as closer to home in London. Notable highlights include his 2010 TEDGlobal talk in Oxford, which has been viewed more than a million times.

Marks promotes a number of "Big Ideas" about the role of happiness in multiple aspects of our lives:

- We spend far too much of our lives at work to be miserable. Happiness at work is an important driver of productivity and efficiency. According to Marks, we need to better understand the role happiness plays in the workplace in order to benefit from the exponential benefits it can bring. And we need to learn how to make this change happen.
- Working with the UK Government Office of Science’s Foresight Project, Marks developed Five Ways to Wellbeing - connect, be active, take notice, keep learning, and give - so that people could take action and improve their own wellbeing.
- Measuring GDP is no longer a clear indicator of a country's progress nor indeed is progress a measure of happiness. In developing the Happy Planet Index Marks advocates that happiness should not be achieved at the expense of our planet.
- People's subjective wellbeing can be measured and in so doing, the health of a nation can be better evaluated. In 2005, Marks was part of a team of experts who developed 50 key questions for the European Social Survey to measure subjective wellbeing.
- A 2005 report Spoiled Ballot, written by Marks et al., formed the basis for the successful Voter Power Index, which lets people see how much their vote actually counts.

== Selected publications ==
- A Happiness Manifesto (One of the three original TED books)
- Five Ways to Well-being
- National Accounts of Well-being
- The Happy Planet Index
