= Lifestyle creep =

Social phenomenon

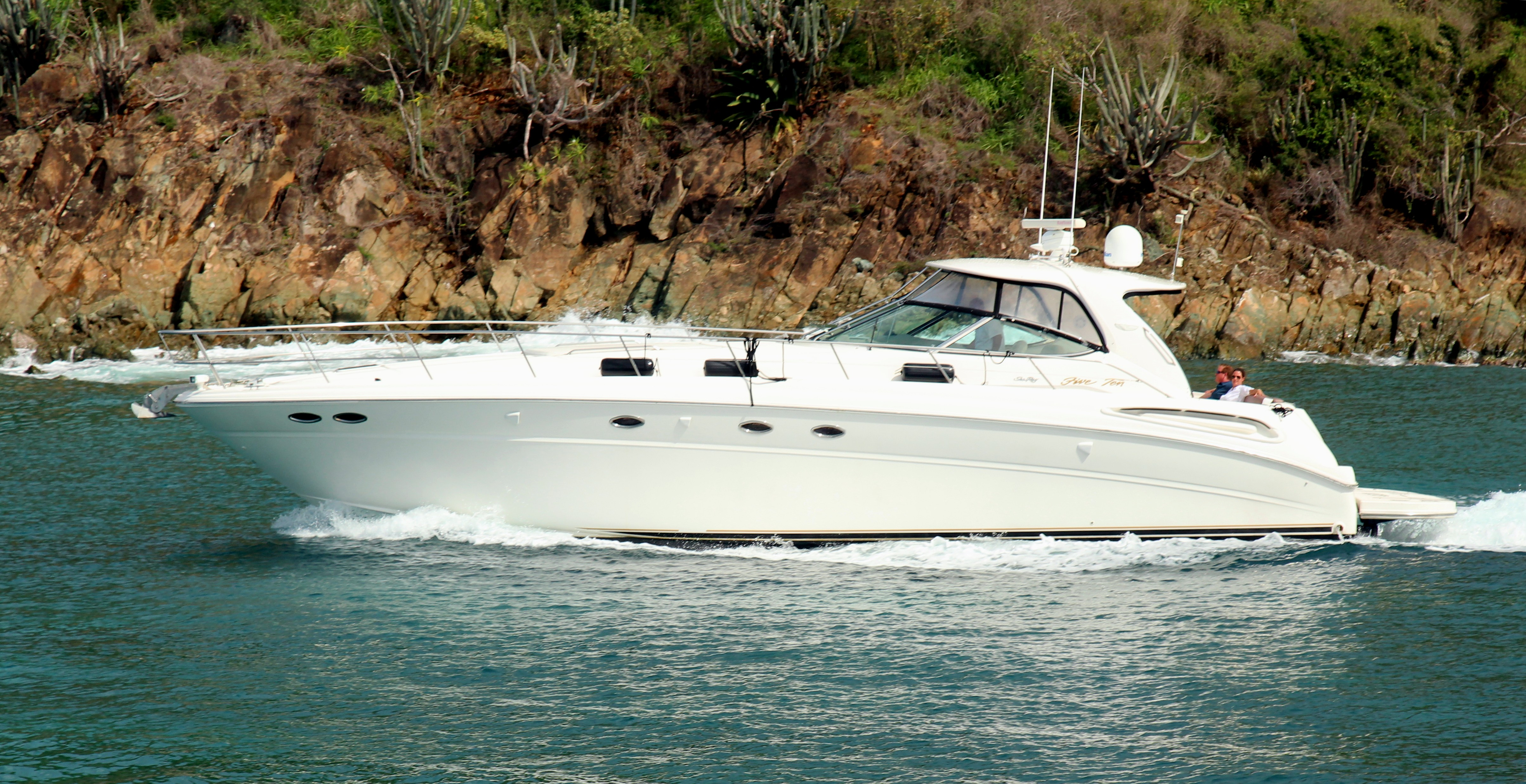
A Sea Ray Sundancer motorboat in Cruz Bay, an example of a luxury good associated with increased wealth

Lifestyle creep, also known as lifestyle inflation, is a phenomenon that occurs when, as more resources are spent on standard of living, former luxuries become perceived necessities.

== Description ==
An individual's discretionary income could increase as a result of increased income or decreased cost, such as paying off a mortgage. As discretionary income increases, individuals are able to spend money on things that were previously unaffordable. Lifestyle creep occurs when spending increases at the same rate as income. It can be reflected in purchases, such as expensive vehicles or a second home. Spending money on things with ongoing maintenance costs, such as club memberships, also are demonstrated in lifestyle creep.

Lifestyle creep tends to be subtle, so it can be difficult to realize it is occurring. This is why some experts have called it a “silent inflation”. It can also be contagious, as people compare their own lifestyle with others. Signs of lifestyle creep could include difficulty saving money and increasing debt. In order to limit lifestyle creep, it is recommended to make a budget and set a limit on expenses.

This phenomenon is common among young adults in their mid-twenties to early thirties. In this age group, rapid career advancements lead to more discretionary income which can lead to excess spending. Reasons also include spender's need to project a certain image and social status onto others, thus buying expensive gadgets and items just to fit in.

It can also become a particular problem near the age of retirement, where individuals tend to have the highest earning potential and decreased costs, such as not having the financial burden of raising children. When individuals retire and try to maintain a formerly lavish lifestyle, they can suffer financially. Furthermore, it is challenging to downgrade lifestyle.

== See also ==
- Diderot effect
- Hedonic treadmill
- Induced consumption
