= Robert S. Erikson =

American political scientist

Academic background
- Education: University of Illinois Urbana-Champaign (PhD)

Academic work
- Discipline: American politics
- Institutions: Florida State University; University of Houston; Columbia University

Robert S. Erikson is a political scientist who specializes in American politics. He is a professor of political science at Columbia University.

== Biography ==
Erikson received his M.A. and Ph.D. in political science from the University of Illinois Urbana-Champaign. He joined the faculty of Florida State University before moving to the University of Houston in 1978. He was appointed Distinguished Professor of Political Science at Houston in 1991 and joined the Columbia University faculty in 1999. He was also a visiting professor at Washington University in St. Louis and the California Institute of Technology.

Erikson's research focuses on political behavior and elections and quantitative methodology. He is the author of the popular textbook American Public Opinion: Its Origins, Content, and Impact and The Macro Polity, which provided the first comprehensive model of American politics at the system level.

Erikson was editor of the American Journal of Political Science from 1982 to 1984.

Erikson was elected a fellow of the American Academy of Arts and Sciences in 2007.
