= Richard Easterlin =

American economist (1926–2024)

Richard A. Easterlin
- Born: January 12, 1926; Ridgefield Park, New Jersey, U.S.
- Died: December 14, 2024 (aged 98); Pasadena, California, U.S.

Academic background
- Education: Stevens Institute of Technology (BS); University of Pennsylvania (MA, PhD)
- Doctoral advisor: Simon Kuznets
- Influences: Simon Kuznets and Dorothy Thomas

Academic work
- Discipline: Demography, Economic history, Economic growth, Happiness economics
- Institutions: University of Pennsylvania; University of Southern California
- Notable ideas: Easterlin hypothesis, Easterlin paradox, Happiness economics

Richard Ainley Easterlin (January 12, 1926 – December 16, 2024) was an American economist. A professor of economics at the University of Southern California, he is best known for the economic theory named after him, the Easterlin paradox. Another of his contributions is the Easterlin hypothesis about long waves of baby booms and busts.

== Background ==
Easterlin was born in Ridgefield Park, New Jersey, on January 12, 1926. He studied engineering at the Stevens Institute of Technology and graduated with a degree in mechanical engineering with Distinction in 1945. He then completed an MA in economics in 1949 and his Ph.D. in economics in 1953 both at the University of Pennsylvania.

He became interested in demography and population studies through his participation as a research associate from 1953 to 1955 in the landmark Study of population Redistribution and Economic Growth in the United States conducted by Simon Kuznets and Dorothy Thomas.

Easterlin died in Pasadena, California on December 16, 2024, at the age of 98.

See biographical memoir from the National Academy of Sciences for additional details.

== Academic career ==
Whilst completing his postgraduate studies, Easterlin worked as instructor from 1948 to 1953 at the University of Pennsylvania. After completing his Doctor of Philosophy he became an assistant professor of economics from 1953 to 1956. He was also a Research Associate of the National Bureau of Economic Research from 1955 to 1956. From 1956 to 1960 he was an associate professor of economics and also a visiting professor at Stanford University in 1960 to 1961. From 1956 to 1966 he was also a member of the Research Staff National Bureau of Economic Research. He was then a full professor of economics from 1960 to 1978 and was the William R. Kenan Jr. Professor in Economics at the University of Pennsylvania from 1978 to 1982. His students included Morton Schapiro.

Whilst at the University of Pennsylvania, Easterlin served as the chairman of the Department of Economics from 1958 to 1960, from 1961 to 1962 and in 1965 and 1968. He was also the associate dean for budget and planning of the University of Pennsylvania Faculty of Arts and Sciences from 1974 to 1979. He then moved to the University of Southern California in 1982 as a professor of economics and then university professor since 1999.

He retired from teaching in 2018, but continued publishing up until he died in 2024. His last book was published open access in 2025 by Cambridge University Press with a remembrance-foreword by Andrew Oswald.

== Contributions ==
Easterlin was in particular known for his 1974 article "Does Economic Growth Improve the Human Lot? Some Empirical Evidence" and the Easterlin paradox which he argued that contrary to expectation, happiness at a national level does not increase with income over time. He is also known for the Easterlin hypothesis, which states that the relationship between income and fertility is dependent on relative income (income relative to aspirations).

== Awards ==
Easterlin was a Fellow of the Center for Advanced Study in the Behavioral Sciences from 1970 to 1971, was elected as a Fellow of the American Academy of Arts and Sciences in 1978, was the Sherman Fairchild Distinguished Scholar at the California Institute of Technology from 1980 to 1981, was elected a Fellow of the Econometric Society in 1983, was awarded the Burlington Northern Faculty Achievement Award at the University of Southern California in 1987, was appointed to the Board of Directors as the Representative of the Economic History Association to the National Bureau of Economic Research from 1986 to 1997, was awarded the Raubenheimer Award for Teaching and Research at the University of Southern California in 1988, was selected as a Fellow of the John Simon Guggenheim Memorial Foundation from 1988 to 1989, was awarded the Irene B. Taeuber Award by the Population Association of America in 1993, received an Honorary Doctorate from Lund University in Sweden in 1998, was elected as a Member of the United States National Academy of Sciences, was awarded the Mellon Award for Excellence in Mentoring by the Center for Excellence in Teaching at the University of Southern California in 2006, was awarded the Distinguished Researcher Award by the International Society for Quality of Life Studies in 2006, was elected a Distinguished Fellow of the American Economic Association in 2006, was awarded the IZA Prize in Labor Economics from the Institute for the Study of Labor in 2009, and received the Laureate Award from the International Union for the Scientific Study of Population in 2010.
