= Negativity bias =

Tendency to give more importance to negative experiences than positive ones

Negativity bias, also known as the negativity effect, is a cognitive bias that human cognition is relatively more affected by a negative effect than an equally potent positive effect. The negativity bias has been investigated across different domains, including the formation of impressions and general evaluations; attention, learning, and memory; and decision-making and risk considerations.

== Explanations ==
Paul Rozin and Edward Royzman proposed four elements of the negativity bias in order to explain its manifestation: negative potency, steeper negative gradients, negativity dominance, and negative differentiation.

=== Negative potency ===
Negative potency refers to the notion that, while possibly of equal magnitude or emotionality, negative and positive items/events/etc. are not equally salient. Rozin and Royzman note that this characteristic of the negativity bias is only empirically demonstrable in situations with inherent measurability, such as comparing how positively or negatively a change in temperature is interpreted.

=== Steeper negative gradient ===
With respect to positive and negative gradients, it seems that negative events are thought to be perceived as increasingly more negative than positive events are increasingly positive the closer one gets (spatially or temporally) to the affective event itself. In other words, there is a steeper negative gradient than positive gradient. For example, the negative experience of an impending dental surgery is perceived as increasingly more negative the closer one gets to the date of surgery than the positive experience of an impending party is perceived as increasingly more positive the closer one gets to the date of celebration (assuming for the sake of this example that these events are equally positive and negative). Rozin and Royzman argue that this characteristic is distinct from that of negative potency because there appears to be evidence of steeper negative slopes relative to positive slopes even when potency itself is low. Negativity bias is like a scale, put ten positive comments on one side, and ten negative comments on the other. The side of the scale holding the negative comments would be lower because our brains feel the emotional connection stronger towards negative comments than positive ones.

=== Negativity dominance ===
Negativity dominance describes the tendency for the combination of positive and negative items/events/etc. to skew towards an overall more negative interpretation than would be suggested by the summation of the individual positive and negative components. Phrasing in more Gestalt-friendly terms, the whole is more negative than the sum of its parts.

=== Negative differentiation ===
Negative differentiation is consistent with evidence suggesting that the conceptualization of negativity is more elaborate and complex than that of positivity. For instance, research indicates that negative vocabulary is more richly descriptive of the affective experience than that of positive vocabulary. Furthermore, there appear to be more terms employed to indicate negative emotions than positive emotions. The notion of negative differentiation is consistent with the mobilization-minimization hypothesis, which posits that negative events, as a consequence of this complexity, require a greater mobilization of cognitive resources to deal with the affective experience and a greater effort to minimize the consequences.

== Evidence ==
=== Social judgments and impression formation ===
Most of the early evidence suggesting a negativity bias stems from research on social judgments and impression formation, in which it became clear that negative information was typically more heavily weighted when participants were tasked with forming comprehensive evaluations and impressions of other target individuals. Generally speaking, when people are presented with a range of trait information about a target individual, the traits are neither "averaged" nor "summed" to reach a final impression. When these traits differ in terms of their positivity and negativity, negative traits disproportionately impact the final impression. This is specifically in line with the notion of negativity dominance (see "Explanations" above).

As an example, a famous study by Leon Festinger and colleagues investigated critical factors in predicting friendship formation; the researchers concluded that whether or not people became friends was most strongly predicted by their proximity to one another. Ebbesen, Kjos, and Konecni, however, demonstrated that proximity itself does not predict friendship formation; rather, proximity serves to amplify the information that is relevant to the decision of either forming or not forming a friendship. Negative information is just as amplified as positive information by proximity. As negative information tends to outweigh positive information, proximity may predict a failure to form friendships even more so than successful friendship formation.

One explanation that has been put forth as to why such a negativity bias is demonstrated in social judgments is that people may generally consider negative information to be more diagnostic of an individual's character than positive information, that it is more useful than positive information in forming an overall impression. This is supported by indications of higher confidence in the accuracy of one's formed impression when it was formed more on the basis of negative traits than positive traits. People consider negative information to be more important to impression formation and, when it is available to them, they are subsequently more confident.

An oft-cited paradox, a dishonest person can sometimes act honestly while still being considered to be predominantly dishonest; on the other hand, an honest person who sometimes does dishonest things will likely be reclassified as a dishonest person. It is expected that a dishonest person will occasionally be honest, but this honesty will not counteract the prior demonstrations of dishonesty. Honesty is considered more easily tarnished by acts of dishonesty. Honesty itself would then be not diagnostic of an honest nature, only the absence of dishonesty.

The presumption that negative information has greater diagnostic accuracy is also evident in voting patterns. Voting behaviors have been shown to be more affected or motivated by negative information than positive: people tend to be more motivated to vote against a candidate because of negative information than they are to vote for a candidate because of positive information. As noted by researcher Jill Klein, "character weaknesses were more important than strengths in determining...the ultimate vote".

This diagnostic preference for negative traits over positive traits is thought to be a consequence of behavioral expectations: there is a general expectation that, owing to social requirements and regulations, people will generally behave positively and exhibit positive traits. Contrastingly, negative behaviors/traits are more unexpected and, thus, more salient when they are exhibited. The relatively greater salience of negative events or information means they ultimately play a greater role in the judgment process.

==== Attribution of Intentions ====
Studies reported in a paper in the Journal of Experimental Psychology: General by Carey Morewedge (2009) found that people exhibit a negativity bias in attribution of external agency, such that they are more likely to attribute negative outcomes to the intentions of another person than similar neutral and positive outcomes. In laboratory experiments, Morewedge found that participants were more likely to believe that a partner had influenced the outcome of a gamble in when the participants lost money than won money, even when the probability of winning and losing money was held even. This bias is not limited to adults. Children also appear to be more likely to attribute negative events to intentional causes than similarly positive events.

=== Cognition ===
As addressed by negative differentiation, negative information seems to require greater information processing resources and activity than does positive information; people tend to think and reason more about negative events than positive events. Neurological differences also point to greater processing of negative information: participants exhibit greater event-related potentials when reading about, or viewing photographs of, people performing negative acts that were incongruent with their traits than when reading about incongruent positive acts. This additional processing leads to differences between positive and negative information in attention, learning, and memory.

==== Attention ====
A number of studies have suggested that negativity is essentially an attention magnet. For example, when tasked with forming an impression of presented target individuals, participants spent longer looking at negative photographs than they did looking at positive photographs. Similarly, participants registered more eye blinks when studying negative words than positive words (blinking rate has been positively linked to cognitive activity). Also, people were found to show greater orienting responses following negative than positive outcomes, including larger increases in pupil diameter, heart rate, and peripheral arterial tone.

Importantly, this preferential attendance to negative information is evident even when the affective nature of the stimuli is irrelevant to the task itself. The automatic vigilance hypothesis has been investigated using a modified Stroop task. Participants were presented with a series of positive and negative personality traits in several different colors; as each trait appeared on the screen, participants were to name the color as quickly as possible. Even though the positive and negative elements of the words were immaterial to the color-naming task, participants were slower to name the color of negative traits than they were positive traits. This difference in response latencies indicates that greater attention was devoted to processing the trait itself when it was negative.

Aside from studies of eye blinks and color naming, Baumeister and colleagues noted in their review of bad events versus good events that there is also easily accessible, real-world evidence for this attentional bias: bad news sells more papers and the bulk of successful novels are full of negative events and turmoil. When taken in conjunction with the laboratory-based experiments, there is strong support for the notion that negative information generally has a stronger pull on attention than does positive information.

==== Learning and memory ====
Learning and memory are direct consequences of attentional processing: the more attention is directed or devoted toward something, the more likely it is that it will be later learned and remembered. Research concerning the effects of punishment and reward on learning suggests that punishment for incorrect responses is more effective in enhancing learning than are rewards for correct responses—learning occurs more quickly following bad events than good events.

Drs. Pratto and John addressed the effects of affective information on incidental memory as well as attention using their modified Stroop paradigm (see section concerning "Attention"). Not only were participants slower to name the colors of negative traits, they also exhibited better incidental memory for the presented negative traits than they did for the positive traits, regardless of the proportion of negative to positive traits in the stimuli set.

Intentional memory is also impacted by the stimuli's negative or positive quality. When studying both positive and negative behaviors, participants tend to recall more negative behaviors during a later memory test than they do positive behaviors, even after controlling for serial position effects. There is also evidence that people exhibit better recognition memory and source memory for negative information.

When asked to recall a recent emotional event, people tend to report negative events more often than they report positive events, and this is thought to be because these negative memories are more salient than are the positive memories. People also tend to underestimate how frequently they experience positive affect, in that they more often forget the positively emotional experiences than they forget negatively emotional experiences.

=== Decision-making ===
Studies of the negativity bias have also been related to research within the domain of decision-making, specifically as it relates to risk aversion or loss aversion. When presented with a situation in which a person stands to either gain something or lose something depending on the outcome, potential costs were argued to be more heavily considered than potential gains. The greater consideration of losses (i.e. negative outcomes) is in line with the principle of negative potency as proposed by Rozin and Royzman. This issue of negativity and loss aversion as it relates to decision-making is most notably addressed by Drs. Daniel Kahneman's and Amos Tversky's prospect theory.

However, it is worth noting that Rozin and Royzman were never able to find loss aversion in decision making. They wrote, "in particular, strict gain and loss of money does not reliably demonstrate loss aversion". This is consistent with the findings of a recent review of more than 40 studies of loss aversion focusing on decision problems with equal sized gains and losses. In their review, Yechiam and Hochman (2013) did find a positive effect of losses on performance, autonomic arousal, and response time in decision tasks, which they suggested is due to the effect of losses on attention. This was labeled by them as loss attention.

==== Politics ====
Research points to a correlation between political affiliation and negativity bias, where conservatives are more sensitive to negative stimuli and therefore tend to lean towards right-leaning ideology which considers threat reduction and social-order to be its main focus. Individuals with lower negativity bias tend to lean towards liberal political policies such as pluralism and are accepting of diverse social groups which by proxy could threaten social structure and cause greater risk of unrest.

== Lifespan development ==
=== Infancy ===
While the majority of investigations into the negativity bias have primarily focused on adults, particularly undergraduate students, a limited number of studies involving infants have also indicated the presence of negativity biases.

Infants are thought to interpret ambiguous situations on the basis of how others around them react. When an adult (e.g. experimenter, mother) displays reactions of happiness, fear, or neutrality towards target toys, infants tend to approach the toy associated with the negative reaction significantly less than the neutral and positive toys. Furthermore, there was greater evidence of neural activity when the infants were shown pictures of the "negative" toy than when shown the "positive" and "neutral" toys. Although recent work with 3-month-olds suggests a negativity bias in social evaluations, as well, there is also work suggesting a potential positivity bias in attention to emotional expressions in infants younger than 7 months. A review of the literature conducted by Drs. Amrisha Vaish, Tobias Grossman, and Amanda Woodward suggests the negativity bias may emerge during the second half of an infant's first year, although the authors also note that research on the negativity bias and affective information has been woefully neglected within the developmental literature.

=== Aging and older adults ===
Some research indicates that older adults may display, at least in certain situations, a positivity bias or positivity effect. Proposed by Dr. Laura Carstensen and colleagues, the socioemotional selectivity theory outlines a shift in goals and emotion regulation tendencies with advancing age, resulting in a preference for positive information over negative information. Aside from the evidence in favor of a positivity bias, though, there have still been many documented cases of older adults displaying a negativity bias.

== Criticism ==
In Rethinking the Negativity Bias, Jennifer Corns describes the negativity bias as "ill-formed." Corns proposes alternative hedonic hypotheses, such as informational and hedonic features.

== See also ==
- Fading affect bias – Memory bias affecting emotional memory
- Human nature – Natural dispositions and characteristics that humans possess
- List of biases in judgment and decision making
- Mean world syndrome – Perceiving the world to be more dangerous than it really is
- Murphy's law – Adage that anything that can go wrong will go wrong
- Pollyanna hypothesis – Tendency to remember pleasant things better
- Positive–negative asymmetry
- Positivity offset – Cognitive bias
- Prospect theory – Theory of behavioral economics
