= Well-being contributing factors =

Psychology topic

Well-being is a multifaceted topic studied in psychology, especially positive psychology. Biologically, well-being is highly influenced by endogenous molecules that impact happiness and euphoria in organisms, often referred to as "well-being related markers". Related concepts are eudaimonia, happiness, flourishing, quality of life, contentment, and meaningful life.

== Theories ==
Central theories are Diener's tripartite model of subjective well-being, Ryff's Six-factor Model of Psychological Well-being, Corey Keyes' work on flourishing, and Seligman's contributions to positive psychology and his theories on authentic happiness and P.E.R.M.A.

Positive psychology is concerned with eudaimonia, "the good life" or flourishing, living according to what holds the greatest value in life – the factors that contribute the most to a well-lived and fulfilling life. While not attempting a strict definition of the good life, positive psychologists agree that one must live a happy, engaged, and meaningful life in order to experience "the good life". Martin Seligman referred to "the good life" as "using your signature strengths every day to produce authentic happiness and abundant gratification". According to Christopher Peterson, "eudaimonia trumps hedonism".

Research on positive psychology, well-being, eudaimonia and happiness, and the theories of Diener, Ryff, Keyes and Seligmann cover a broad range of levels and topics, including "the biological, personal, relational, institutional, cultural, and global dimensions of life." Happiness was famously analyzed by Aristotle as being the sole ultimate goal of human existence, meaning that he viewed it the only thing important in its own right, not merely as a means to an end.

The pursuit of happiness predicts both positive emotions and less depressive symptoms. People who prioritize happiness are more psychologically able, all else held equal.

== Methodology of study ==
=== Well-being measurement ===
Different ways of measuring well-being reveal different contributing factors. The correlation between two of these, life satisfaction and happiness, in the World Values Survey (1981–2005) is only 0.47. These are different, but related concepts which are used interchangeably outside of academia. Typically, life satisfaction, or evaluative wellbeing is measured with Cantril's self-anchoring ladder, a questionnaire where wellbeing is rated on a scale from 1–10. Happiness or hedonic/Affective well-being measurement is measured with the positive and negative affect schedule (PANAS), a more complex scale.

=== Limitations ===
The UK Government's Department of Health compiled a factsheet in 2014, in which it is stated that the key limitations to well-being, quality of life and life satisfaction research are that:

- There are numerous associations and correlations in the body of evidence, but few causal relationships, since existing longitudinal datasets "do not use consistent wellbeing and predictor measures at different time points";
- After controlling for mental health status, not many of the found associations are still significant;
- Subgroup analyses are rare;
- There are too few studies to conduct meta-analyses;
- There are too few interventional studies.

== Major factors ==
=== For evaluative well-being (life satisfaction) ===
Mental health is the strongest individual predictor of life satisfaction. Mental illness is associated with poorer well-being. In fact, mental health is the strongest determinant of quality of life at a later age.

Studies have documented the relationship between anxiety and quality of life.

The VOXEU analysis of happiness showed the principal determinants of an adult's life satisfaction to be income, parenting, family break up, mother's mental health and schooling. The factors that explain life satisfaction roughly map (negatively) to those factors that explain misery. They are first and foremost diagnosed depression/anxiety, which explains twice as much as the next factor, physical health (number of medical conditions), that explains just as much variance in subjective well-being between people, as income and whether someone is partnered. These factors count twice as much as each of whether someone is employed and whether they are a non-criminal, which in turn are 3 times as important as years of education.

Overall, the best predictor of an adult's life satisfaction is their emotional health as a child as reported by the mother and child. It trumps factors like the qualifications that someone gets and their behaviour at 16 as reported by the mother. A child and therefore an adult's emotional health is most affected itself by a mother's mental health, which is just over twice as important as family income. 2/3 as important as family income is parent's involvement, which is 0.1 partial correlation coefficients more important than aggressive parenting (negative), father's unemployment (negative), family conflict (negative) and whether the mother worked in the subject's 1st year of life.

Whether the mother worked thereafter has 0 correlation with well-being, however. In terms of non-family factors, the place where someone goes to secondary school matters a fair bit more than observed family background altogether, which in turn is slightly more important than the place where someone went to primary school.

=== For affective well-being (happiness) ===
The main determinants of affective well-being, by correlation and effect size are:

1. Corruption index (-0.54)
2. Control of corruption (0.47)
3. Bureaucratic quality (0.40)
4. PPP-adjusted GDP per capita (although there is evidence of publication bias) (0.39)
5. Economic freedom (0.35)
6. Human rights violations (-0.33)
7. Political and ethnic violence (-0.28)
8. Civil liberties (0.28)
9. Life expectancy at birth (0.27)
10. Satisfaction with standard of living (0.24)

== Biological factors ==
=== Gender ===
Over the last 33 years, a significant decrease in women's happiness leads researchers to believe that men are happier than women. In contrast, a Pew Research Centre survey found that more women are satisfied with their lives than men, overall. Other research has found no gender gap in happiness.

Part of these findings could be due to the way men and women differ in calculating their happiness. Women calculate the positive self-esteem, closeness in their relationships and religion. Men calculate positive self-esteem, active leisure and mental control. Therefore, neither men nor women are at greater risk of being less happy than the other. Earlier in life, women are more likely than men to fulfill their goals (material goals and family life aspirations), thereby increasing their life satisfaction and overall happiness. However, it is later in life that men fulfill their goals, are more satisfied with their family life and financial situation and, as a result, their overall happiness surpasses that of women. Possible explanations include the unequal division of labor within the household, or that women experience more variance (more extremes) in emotion but are generally happier. Effects of gender on well-being are paradoxical: men report feeling less happy than women, however, women are more susceptible to depression.

A study was conducted by Siamak Khodarahimi to determine the roles of gender and age on positive psychology constructs – psychological hardiness, emotional intelligence, self-efficacy and happiness – among 200 Iranian adolescents and 200 young adults who were questioned through various tests. The study found that the males of the sample showed significantly higher rates in psychological hardiness, emotional intelligence, self-efficacy and happiness than females, regardless of age.

=== Genetics ===
Happiness is partly genetically based. Based on twin studies, 50 percent of a given human's happiness level is genetically determined, 10 percent is affected by life circumstances and situation, and a remaining 40 percent of happiness is subject to self-control.

Whether emotions are genetically determined or not was studied by David Lykken and Auke Tellegen. They found that up to 80% of the variance in long-term sense of well-being among Minnesotan twins separated at birth was attributable to heredity. The remaining theoretical 20%, however, still leaves room for significant change in thoughts and behavior from environmental/learned sources that should not be understated, and the interpretation of variance in twin studies is controversial, even among clinical psychologists.

Individual differences in both overall Eudaimonia, identified loosely with self-control, and in the facets of eudaimonia are inheritable. Evidence from one study supports 5 independent genetic mechanisms underlying the Ryff facets of this trait, leading to a genetic construct of eudaimonia in terms of general self-control, and four subsidiary biological mechanisms enabling the psychological capabilities of purpose, agency, growth, and positive social relations.

=== Neurology ===
It is generally accepted that happiness is at least in part mediated through dopaminergic, adrenergic and serotonergic metabolism. A correlation has been found between hormone levels and happiness. SSRIs, such as Prozac, are used to adjust the levels of serotonin in the clinically unhappy. Researchers, such as Alexander, have indicated that many peoples usage of narcotics may be the unwitting result of attempts to readjust hormone levels to cope with situations that make them unhappy.

A positive relationship has been found between the volume of gray matter in the right precuneus area of the brain and the subject's subjective happiness score. Meditation based interventions, including mindfulness, have been found to correlate with a significant gray matter increase within the precuneus.

=== Neuroscience's findings ===
Neuroscience and brain imaging have shown increasing potential for helping science understand happiness and sadness, as parts of the brain have been identified as having a role in the control of happiness, specifically with regard to research in the field of neurotransmitters. Though it may be impossible to achieve any comprehensive objective measure of happiness, some physiological correlates to happiness can be measured. Stefan Klein, in his book The Science of Happiness, links the dynamics of neurobiological systems (i.e., dopaminergic, opiate) to the concepts and findings of positive psychology and social psychology.

Nobel Prize winner Eric Kandel and researcher Cynthia Fu described very accurate diagnoses of depression just by looking at fMRI brain scans. By identifying neural correlates for emotions, scientists may be able to use methods like brain scans to tell us more about the different ways of being "happy". Richard Davidson has conducted research to determine which parts of the brain are involved in positive emotions. He found that the left prefrontal cortex is more activated when we are happy and is also associated with greater ability to recover from negative emotions as well as enhanced ability to suppress negative emotions. Davidson found that people can train themselves to increase activation in this area of their brains. It is thought that our brain can change throughout our lives as a result of our experiences; this is known as neuroplasticity.

The evolutionary perspective offers an alternative approach to understanding happiness and quality of life. Key guiding questions are: What features are included in the brain that allow humans to distinguish between positive and negative states of mind? How do these features improve humans' ability to survive and reproduce? The evolutionary perspective claims that the answers to these questions point towards an understanding of what happiness is about and how to best exploit the capacities of the brain with which humans are endowed. This perspective is presented formally and in detail by the evolutionary biologist Bjørn Grinde in his 2002 book Darwinian Happiness.

== Personal factors ==
=== In relation with age ===
==== In adolescence ====
There has been a significant focus in past research on adulthood, in regards to well-being and development and although eudaimonia is not a new field of study, there has been little research done in the areas of adolescence and youth. Research that has been done on this age group had previously explored more negative aspects than well-being, such as problem and risk behaviours (i.e. drug and alcohol use).

Researchers who conducted a study in 2013 recognized the absence of adolescents in eudaimonic research and the importance of this developmental stage. Adolescents rapidly face cognitive, social and physical changes, making them prime subjects to study for development and well-being. The eudaimonic identity theory was used in their research to examine the development of identity through self-discovery and self-realization. They emphasize the personal value found in discovering and appeasing one's "daimon" (daemon) through subjective experiences that develop eudaimonic happiness from aligning with one's true self.

Researchers focused their studies on PYD (positive youth development) and the eudaimonic identity theory in the context of three developmental elements: self-defining activities, personal expressiveness and goal-directed behaviours.

They determined that adolescents sample multiple self-defining activities; these activities aid in identity formation, as individuals choose activities that they believe represents who they are. These self-defining activities also help determine the adolescent's social environments. For example, an adolescent involved in sports, would likely surround themselves with like-minded active and competitive people.

Personal expressiveness, as coined by psychologist A. S. Waterman, are the activities that we choose to express and connect with our "daimon" through subjective experiences.

Finally, goal-directed behaviours, are developed through goal setting, where individuals work towards identity establishment. Adolescents recognize their passions, abilities and talents and aim to fulfill their goals and behave in a way that appeases their true self.

The study on adolescents was conducted in Italy, Chile and the United States, which produced slightly varied outcomes. Outcomes were contingent on availability, access and choice of opportunities (activities). Socioeconomic context also affected the results, as not all individuals could access the activities that may be more in-line with their true selves.

The Personally Expressive Activities Questionnaire (PEAQ) was used to conduct the study. Adolescence was the youngest age group that the PEAQ was used on. The PEAQ asked adolescents to self-report on activities they participate in and describe themselves with self-defining activities. It was reported that 80% of adolescents defined themselves with two to four self-defining activities signifying an understanding in adolescence of self-concept through the domains of leisure, work and academia.

Leisure activities were found to have the largest impact on individuals because these activities were the most self-directed of the three domains, as adolescents had the choice of activity, and were more likely to be able to align it with their true selves. The study found that subjective experiences were more important than the activities themselves and that adolescents reported higher levels of well-being. They reported that when adolescents express themselves through self-defining activities across multiple domains, they have a clearer image of themselves, of what they want to achieve and higher wellness. Goal-setting was found to be a unique predictor; when adolescents work towards goals set by themselves and accomplish them, they are likely to have a clearer emerging identity and higher well-being. Researchers found that more adolescents were happy when they were involved in self-chosen activities because the activities were chosen in line with their true self.

==== In midlife ====
The midlife crisis may mark the first reliable drop in happiness during an average human's life. Evidence suggests most people generally become happier with age, with the exception of the years 40 – 50, which is the typical age at which a crisis might occur. Researchers specify that people in both their 20s and 70s are happier than during midlife, although the extent of happiness changes at different rates. For example, feelings of stress and anger tend to decline after age 20, worrying drops after age 50, and enjoyment very slowly declines in adulthood but finally starts to rise after age 50. Well-being in late life is more likely to be related to other contextual factors including proximity to death. However, most of this terminal decline in well-being could be attributed to other changes in age-normative functional declines including physical health and function. Also, there is growing debate that assumptions that a single population estimate of age-related changes in well-being truly reflects the lived experiences of older adults has been questioned. The use of growth mixture modelling frameworks has allowed researchers to identify homogenous groups of individuals who are more similar to each other than the population based on their level and change in well-being and has shown that most report stable well-being in their late life and in the decade prior to death. These findings are based on decades of data, and control for cohort groups; the data avoids the risk that the drops in happiness during midlife are due to populations' unique midlife experiences, like a war. The studies have also controlled for income, job status and parenting (as opposed to childlessness) to try to isolate the effects of age.

Researchers found support for the notion of age changes inside the individual that affect happiness. This could be for any number of reasons. Psychological factors could include greater awareness of one's self and preferences; an ability to control desires and have more realistic expectations – unrealistic expectations tend to foster unhappiness; moving closer to death may motivate people to pursue personal goals; improved social skills, like forgiveness, may take years to develop – the practice of forgiveness seems linked to higher levels of happiness; or happier people may live longer and are slightly overrepresented in the elderly population. Age-related chemical changes might also play a role.

Other studies have found older individuals reported more health problems, but fewer problems overall. Young adults reported more anger, anxiety, depression, financial problems, troubled relationships and career stress. Researchers also suggest depression in the elderly is often due largely to passivity and inaction – they recommend people continue to undertake activities that bring happiness, even in old age.

The activity restriction model of depressed affect suggests that stressors that disrupt traditional activities of daily life can lead to a decrease in mental health. The elderly population is vulnerable to activity restriction because of the disabling factors related to age. Increases in scheduled activity, as well as social support, can decrease the chances of activity restriction.

=== In relation with depression and languishing ===
A study by Keyes found that there are major costs of depression, which 14% of adults experience annually: it impairs social roles; it costs billions each year due to work absenteeism, diminished productivity, and healthcare costs; finally, depression accounts for at least one-third of suicides. Therefore, it is important to study flourishing to learn about what is possible if issues such as depression are tackled and how the ramifications of focusing on the positive make life better not just for one person, but also for others around them.

Flourishing has significant positive aspects magnified when compared to languishing adults and when languishing adults are compared to depressed adults, as explained by Keyes. For example, languishing adults have the same amount of chronic disease as those that are depressed whereas flourishing adults are in exceptionally better physical health. Languishing adults miss as many days at work as depressed adults and, in fact, visit doctors and therapists more than depressed adults.

==== Positive psychology interventions (PPI) in patients ====
A strengths-based approach to personal positive change aims to have clinical psychology place an equal weight on both positive and negative functioning when attempting to understand and treat distress. This rationale is based on empirical findings. Because positive characteristics interact with negative life events to predict disorder the exclusive study of negative life events could produce misleading results.

Positive activity interventions, or PAIs, are brief self-administered exercises that promote positive feelings, thoughts, and behaviors. Two widely used PAIs are "Three Good Things" and "Best Future Self." "Three Good Things" requires a patient to daily document, for a week, three events that went well during the day, and the respective cause, or causes (this exercise can be modified with counterfactual thinking, that is, adding the imagination of things had them been worse). "Best Future Self" has a patient "think about their life in the future, and imagine that everything has gone as well as it possibly could. They have worked hard and succeeded at accomplishing all of their life goals. Think of this as the realization of all of their life dreams." The patient is then asked to write down what they imagined. These positive interventions have been shown to decrease depression, and interventions focusing on strengths and positive emotions can, in fact, be as effective in treating disorder as other more commonly used approaches such as cognitive behavioral therapy. Moreover, the apparent effect of PPIs cannot be caused by publication bias, according to a meta-analysis on 49 studies (2009). PPIs studied included producing gratitude letters, performing optimistic thinking, replaying positive life experiences, and socializing with people.

Also, in a newer meta-analysis (39 studies, 6,139 participants, 2012), the standardized mean difference was 0.34 higher for subjective well-being, 0.20 for psychological well-being and 0.23 for depression. Three to six months after the intervention, the effects for subjective well-being and psychological well-being were still significant, so effects seem fairly sustainable. However, in high-quality studies, the positive effect was weaker, though positive, so authors considered further high-quality studies necessary to strengthen the evidence. They claimed that the above-mentioned meta-analysis (2009) did not put enough weight on the quality of studies. PPIs found positive included blessings, kindness practices, taking personal goals, and showing gratitude.

The interventions called "Gratitude Journaling" and "Three Good Things" seem to operate via gratitude. There is evidence that, when gratitude journaling, focussing on quality over quantity as well as people more than possessions, yields greater benefits. There is also evidence of a diminished effect from gratitude journaling if it is done more than once or twice a week. Journaling sans gratitude is effective in decreasing negative emotions in general, which suggests that the act of journaling, rather than gratitude alone, is involved in the treatment effect.

==== Post-traumatic growth ====
Posttraumatic growth (PTG) is a possible outcome after a traumatic event, besides posttraumatic stress disorder (PTSD). Following a traumatic event, for instance rape, incest, cancer, attack, or combat, "it is normal to experience debilitating symptoms of depression and anxiety." A person who shows PTG however, will experience these negative outcomes for a time and then show an increase in well-being, higher than it was before the trauma occurred. Martin Seligman, a founder of positive psychology, emphasizes that "arriving at a higher level of psychological functioning than before" is a key point in PTG. If instead an individual experiences a depressive period but recovers from an incident and returns to their normal level of psychological functioning, they are demonstrating resilience. This suggests that in PTG, the trauma acts as a turning point for the person to achieve greater well-being. Seligman recognizes "the fact that trauma often sets the stage for growth" and given the right tools, individuals can make the most of that opportunity."

When reflecting on a traumatic growth, Seligman suggests using the following five elements to facilitate PTG: understand the response to trauma, reduce anxiety, utilize constructive disclosure, create a trauma narrative, and articulate life principles and stances that are more robust to challenge. Someone experiencing PTG will achieve elements of Seligman's "good life" theory, including a more meaningful and purposeful valuing of life, improved positive relationships, accomplishment, and a more optimistic and open mindset according to the broaden-and-build theory.

==== Post-traumatic growth in constructive journalism ====
The phenomenon of PTG is applicable to many disciplines. The construct is important not only for just soldiers, emergency responders, and survivors of traumatic events, but on average, for everyday citizens facing typical adversity. One way to expose citizens to stories of PTG is through constructive journalism. Constructive journalism, as defined by PhD student Karen McIntyre at University of North Carolina Chapel Hill, is "an emerging style of journalism in which positive psychology techniques are applied to news work with the aim of engaging readers by creating more productive news stories, all while maintaining core journalistic functions". Cathrine Gyldensted, an experienced reporter with a Masters in applied positive psychology and coauthor of two books, demonstrated that typical news reporting, which is associated with negative valence, harms mood. Using PTG to focus on victims' strengths and instances of overcoming adversity encourages readers to implement similar ideals in their own lives. "So the goal of positive psychology in well-being theory is to measure and to build human flourishing." Combining positive psychology constructs like PTG, PERMA, and "broaden and build" with journalism could potentially improve affect and inspire individuals about the benefits of positive psychology.

PERMA not only plays a role in our own personal lives but also can be used for public major news stories. With this model, journalists can instead focus on the positives of a story and ask questions about how conflicts or even tragedies have brought people together, how someone has experienced post-traumatic growth, and more. News stories then shift the perspective from a victimizing one to an uplifting one. Positive psychology is slowly but steadily making its way through news reporting via constructive journalism. PERMA helps journalists ask the right questions to continue that progress by bringing the focus of a potentially negative story to the positives and solutions.

==== Affect - ratio of positive to negative affect ====
In now discredited work, Fredrickson and Losada postulated in 2005 that the ratio of positive to negative affect, known as the critical positivity ratio, can distinguish individuals that flourish from those that do not. Languishing was characterized by a ratio of positive to negative affect of 2.5. Optimal functioning or flourishing was argued to occur at a ratio of 4.3. The point at which flourishing changes to languishing is called the Losada line and is placed at the positivity ratio of 2.9. Those with higher ratios were claimed to have broader behavioral repertoires, greater flexibility and resilience to adversity, more social resources, and more optimal functioning in many areas of their life. The model also predicted the existence of an upper limit to happiness, reached at a positivity ratio of 11.5. Fredrickson and Losada claimed that at this limit, flourishing begins to disintegrate and productivity and creativity decrease. They suggested as positivity increased, so to "appropriate negativity" needs to increase. This was described as time-limited, practicable feedback connected to specific circumstances, i.e. constructive criticism.

This positivity ratio theory was widely accepted until 2013, when Nick Brown, a graduate student in applied positive psychology, co-authored a paper with Alan Sokal and Harris Friedman, showing that the mathematical basis of the paper was invalid. Fredrickson partially retracted the paper, agreeing that the math may be flawed, but maintaining that the empirical evidence is still valid. Brown and colleagues insist there is no evidence for the critical positivity ratio whatsoever.

=== In relation with basic emotions ===
Efforts to increase positive emotions will not automatically result in decreased negative emotions, nor will decreased negative emotions necessarily result in increased positive emotions. Russell and Feldman Barrett (1992) described emotional reactions as core affects, which are primitive emotional reactions that are consistently experienced but often not acknowledged; they blend pleasant and unpleasant as well as activated and deactivated dimensions that we carry with us at an almost unconscious level.

While a 2012 study found that wellbeing was higher for people who experienced both positive and negative emotions, evidence suggests negative emotions can be damaging. In an article titled "The undoing effect of positive emotions", Barbara Fredrickson et al. hypothesized positive emotions undo the cardiovascular effects of negative emotions. When people experience stress, they show increased heart rate, higher blood sugar, immune suppression, and other adaptations optimized for immediate action. If unregulated, the prolonged physiological activation can lead to illness, coronary heart disease, and heightened mortality. Both lab and survey research substantiate that positive emotions help people under stress to return to a preferable, healthier physiological baseline. Other research shows that improved mood is one of the various benefits of physical exercise.

==== Behavioral repertoire ====
The broaden-and-build theory of positive emotions suggests positive emotions (e.g. happiness, interest, anticipation) broaden one's awareness and encourage novel, varied, and exploratory thoughts and actions. Over time, this broadened behavioral repertoire builds skills and resources. For example, curiosity about a landscape becomes valuable navigational knowledge; pleasant interactions with a stranger become a supportive friendship; aimless physical play becomes exercise and physical excellence. Positive emotions are contrasted with negative emotions, which prompt narrow survival-oriented behaviors. For example, the negative emotion of anxiety leads to the specific fight-or-flight response for immediate survival.

==== Elevation ====
After several years of researching disgust, Jonathan Haidt, and others, studied its opposite; the term "elevation" was coined. Elevation is a pleasant moral emotion, triggered by witnessing virtuous acts of remarkable moral goodness and resulting in a desire to act morally and do "good". As an emotion it has a biological basis, and is sometimes characterized by a feeling of expansion in the chest or a tingling feeling on the skin.

=== In relation with experience ===
Thomas Nagel has said that "There are elements which, if added to one's experience, make life better; there are other elements which if added to one's experience, make life worse. But what remains when these are set aside is not merely neutral: it is emphatically positive."

Experiences are central to a proposed dimension of well-being called psychological richness. This additional dimension of well-being was proposed as an empirically supported expansion to the hedonic vs. eudaimonic well-being dichotomy. Whereas hedonic well-being can be measured via life satisfaction, and eudaimonic well-being can be measured via one's perceptions of the meaning of their life, psychological richness is measured via characteristic experiences. Psychological richness is cultivated through having psychologically rich experiences, which are characterized as varying, interesting, novel, challenging, and perspective-changing, as subjectively measured by the experiencer. One line of evidence for this comes from studies conducted with college students, where students who went on trips (new and unusual experiences), whether they be short excursions or semester-length study abroad programs, reported increased psychological richness, but not increases in happiness or meaning (Oishi et al., 2021). In contrast to hedonic well-being, which is thought to result in personal satisfaction, and eudaimonic well-being, which is thought to result in societal contribution, psychological richness is thought to result in wisdom.

=== The concept of "flourishing" ===
The term flourishing, in positive psychology, refers to optimal human functioning. It comprises four parts: goodness, generativity, growth, and resilience (Fredrickson, 2005). According to Fredrickson (2005), goodness is made up of: happiness, contentment, and effective performance; generativity is about making life better for future generations, and is defined by "broadened thought-action repertoires and behavioral flexibility"; growth involves the use of personal and social assets; and resilience reflects survival and growth after enduring a hardship. A flourishing life stems from mastering all four of these parts. Two contrasting ideologies are languishing and psychopathology. On the mental health continuum, these are considered intermediate mental health disorders, reflecting someone living an unfulfilled and perhaps meaningless life. Those who languish experience more emotional pain, psychosocial deficiency, restrictions in regular activities, and missed workdays.

Fredrickson & Losada (2005) conducted a study on university students, operationalizing positive and negative affect. Based on a mathematical model which has been strongly criticized, and now been formally withdrawn by Fredrickson as invalid, Fredrickson & Losada claimed to have discovered a critical positivity ratio, above which people would flourish and below which they would not. Although Fredrickson claims that her experimental results are still valid, these experimental results have also been questioned due to poor statistical methodology, and Alan Sokal has pointed out that "given [Fredrickson and Losada's] experimental design and method of data analysis, no data whatsoever could possibly give any evidence of any nonlinearity in the relationship between "flourishing" and the positivity ratio — much less evidence for a sharp discontinuity."

Another study surveyed a U.S. sample of 3,032 adults, aged 25–74. Results showed 17.2 percent of adults were flourishing, while 56.6 percent were moderately mentally healthy. Some common characteristics of a flourishing adult included: educated, older, married and wealthy. The study findings suggest there is room for adults to improve as less than 20 percent of Americans are living a flourishing life. (Keyes, 2002).

Benefits from living a flourishing life emerge from research on the effects of experiencing a high ratio of positive to negative affect. The studied benefits of positive affect are increased responsiveness, "broadened behavioral repertoires", increased instinct, and increased perception and imagination. In addition, the good feelings associated with flourishing result in improvements to immune system functioning, cardiovascular recovery, lessened effects of negative affect, and frontal brain asymmetry. Other benefits to those of moderate mental health or moderate levels of flourishing were: stronger psychological and social performance, high resiliency, greater cardiovascular health, and an overall healthier lifestyle (Keyes, 2007). The encountered benefits of flourishing suggest a definition: "[flourishing] people experience high levels of emotional, psychological and social well being due to vigor and vitality, self-determination, continuous self- growth, close relationships and a meaningful and purposeful life" (Siang-Yang, 2006, p. 70).

=== Happiness ===
==== Happiness measurement ====
===== Oxford Happiness Questionnaire =====
Psychologists Peter Hills and Michael Argyle developed the Oxford Happiness Questionnaire as a broad measure of psychological well-being. The approach was criticized for lacking a theoretical model of happiness and for overlapping too much with related concepts such as self-esteem, sense of purpose, social interest, kindness, sense of humor and aesthetic appreciation.

===== Satisfaction with Life Scale =====
"Happiness" encompasses different emotional and mental phenomena. One method of assessment is Ed Diener's Satisfaction with Life Scale. According to Diener, this five-question survey corresponds well with impressions from friends and family, and low incidence of depression.

Rather than long-term, big picture appraisals, some methods attempt to identify the amount of positive affect from one activity to the next. Scientists use beepers to remind volunteers to write down the details of their current situation. Alternatively, volunteers complete detailed diary entries each morning about the day before. A discrepancy arises when researchers compare the results of these short-term "experience sampling" methods, with long-term appraisals. Namely, the latter may not be very accurate; people may not know what makes their life pleasant from one moment to the next. For instance, parents' appraisals mention their children as sources of pleasure, while "experience sampling" indicates parents were not enjoying caring for their children, compared to other activities.

Psychologist Daniel Kahneman explains this discrepancy by differentiating between happiness according to the "experiencing self" compared to the "remembering self": when asked to reflect on experiences, memory biases like the Peak-End effect (e.g. we mostly remember the dramatic parts of a vacation, and how it was at the end) play a large role. A striking finding was in a study of colonoscopy patients. Adding 60 seconds to this invasive procedure, Kahneman found participants reported the colonoscopy as more pleasant. This was attributed to making sure the colonoscopy instrument was not moved during the extra 60 seconds – movement is the source of the most discomfort. Thus, Kahneman was appealing to the remembering self's tendency to focus on the end of the experience. Such findings help explain human error in affective forecasting – people's ability to predict their future emotional states.

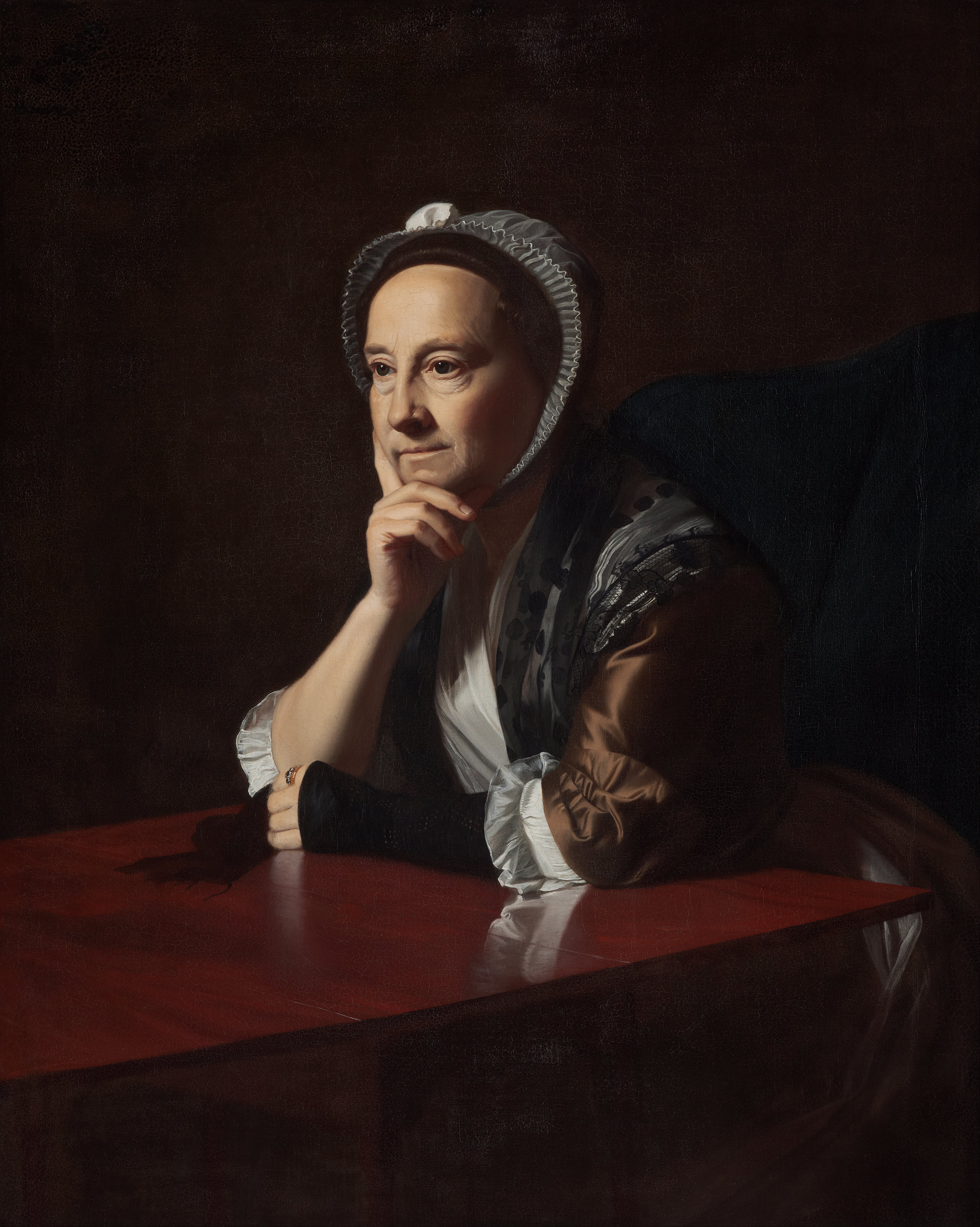
The "remembering self" may not be the best source of information for pleasing the "experiencing self".

==== Changes in happiness levels ====
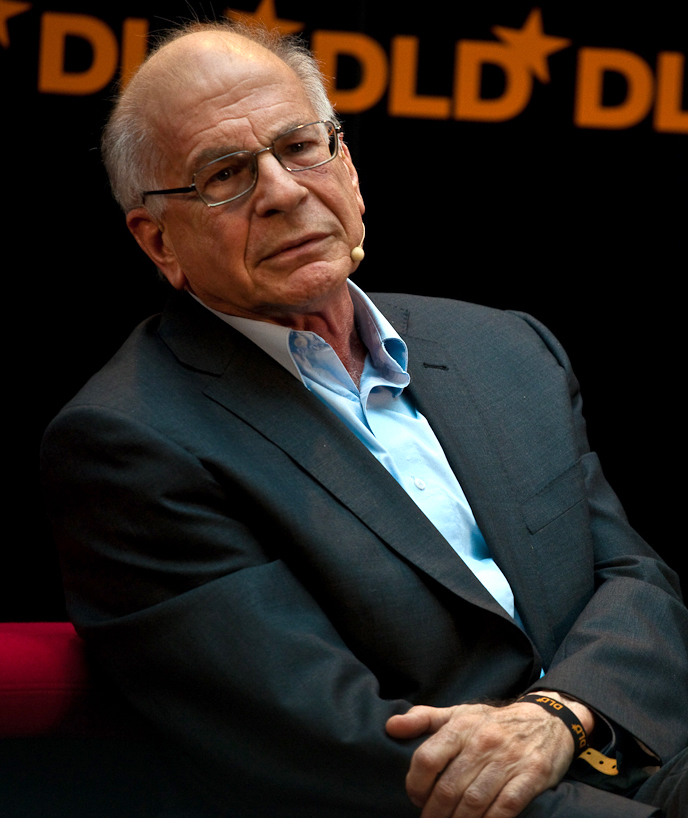
Daniel Kahneman

Humans exhibit a variety of abilities. This includes an ability of emotional Hedonic Adaptation, an idea suggesting that beauty, fame and money do not generally have lasting effects on happiness (this effect has also been called the Hedonic treadmill). In this vein, some research has suggested that only recent events, meaning those that occurred within the last 3 months, affect happiness levels.

The tendency to adapt, and therefore return to an earlier level of happiness, is illustrated by studies showing lottery winners are no happier in the years after they've won. Other studies have shown paraplegics are nearly as happy as control groups that are not paralyzed, after equally few years. Daniel Kahneman explains: "they are not paraplegic full time... It has to do with allocation of attention". Thus, contrary to our impact biases, lotteries and paraplegia do not change experiences to as great a degree as we would believe.

However, in a newer study (2007), winning a medium-sized lottery prize had a lasting mental wellbeing effect of 1.4 GHQ points on Britons even two years after the event. Moreover, adaptation can be a very slow and incomplete process. Distracting life changes such as the death of a spouse or losing one's job can show measurable changes in happiness levels for several years. Even the "adapted" paraplegics mentioned above did ultimately report lower levels of pleasure (again, they were happier than one would expect, but not fully adapted). Thus, adaptation is a complex process, and while it does mitigate the emotional effects of many life events it cannot mitigate them entirely.

===== Happiness set point =====
The happiness set point idea is that most people return to an average level of happiness – or a set point – after temporary highs and lows in emotionality. People whose set points lean toward positive emotionality tend to be cheerful most of the time and those whose set points tend to be more negative emotionality tend to gravitate toward pessimism and anxiety. Lykken found that we can influence our level of well-being by creating environments more conductive to feelings of happiness and by working with our genetic makeup. One reason that subjective well-being is for the most part stable is because of the great influence genetics have. Although the events of life have some effect on subjective well-being, the general population returns to their set point.

1. Genetic (50.0%)
2. Intentional activity (40.0%)
3. Circumstance (10.0%)
Lyubomirsky's breakdown of happiness sources in The How of Happiness. In the recipe for one person's happiness, it is nonsensical to blame one ingredient (because all are necessary). However, when comparing two people's happiness, ingredients like genetics can account for as much as half the difference.

In her 2008 book The How of Happiness, Sonja Lyubomirsky similarly argued people's happiness varies around a genetic set point. Diener warns, however, that it is nonsensical to claim that "happiness is influenced 30–50% by genetics". Diener explains that the recipe for happiness for an individual always requires genetics, environment, and behaviour too, so it is nonsensical to claim that an individual's happiness is due to only one ingredient.

Only differences in happiness can be attributed to differences in factors. In other words, Lyubomirsky's research does not discuss happiness in one individual; it discusses differences in happiness between two or more people. Specifically, Lyubomirsky suggests that 30–40% of the difference in happiness levels is due to genetics (i.e. heritable). In other words, still, Diener says it makes no sense to say one person's happiness is "due 50% to genetics", but it does make sense to say one person's difference in happiness is 50% due to differences in their genetics (and the rest is due to behaviour and environment).

Findings from twin studies support the findings just mentioned. Twins reared apart had nearly the same levels of happiness thereby suggesting the environment is not entirely responsible for differences in people's happiness. Importantly, an individual's baseline happiness is not entirely determined by genetics, and not even by early life influences on one's genetics. Whether or not a person manages to elevate their baseline to the heights of their genetic possibilities depends partly on several factors, including actions and habits. Some happiness-boosting habits seem to include gratitude, appreciation, and even altruistic behavior. Other research-based habits and techniques for increasing happiness are discussed on this page.

Besides the development of new habits, the use of antidepressants, effective exercise, and a healthier diet have proven to affect mood significantly. There is evidence that a vegan diet reduces stress and anxiety. Exercise is sometimes called the "miracle" or "wonder" drug – alluding to the wide variety of proven benefits it provides. A 2010 book, Anatomy of an Epidemic, challenges the use of non-conservative usage of medications for mental patients, specially with respect to their long-term positive feedback effects.

Yongey Mingyur Rinpoche has said that neuro scientists have found that with meditation, an individual's happiness baseline can change. and meditation has been found to increase happiness in several studies. A study on Brahma Kumaris Raja yoga meditators showed them having higher happiness (Oxford happiness questionnaire) than the control group.

===== Evidences against the happiness set point theory =====
In recent large panel studies divorce, death of a spouse, unemployment, disability and similar events have been shown to change the long-term subjective well-being, even though some adaptation does occur and inborn factors affect this.

Fujita and Diener found that 24% of people changed significantly between the first five years of the study and the last five years. Almost one in four people showed changes in their well-being over the years; indeed sometimes those changes were quite dramatic. Bruce Headey found that 5–6% of people dramatically increased their life satisfaction over a 15- to 20-year period and that the goals people pursued significantly affected their life satisfaction.

===== Personal training to increase happiness =====
The easiest and best possible way to increase one's happiness is by doing something that increases the ratio of positive to negative emotions. Contrary to some beliefs, in many scenarios, people are actually very good at determining what will increase their positive emotions. There have been many techniques developed to help increase one's happiness.

A first technique is known as the "Sustainable Happiness Model (SHM)." This model proposes that long-term happiness is determined upon: (1) one's genetically determined set-point, (2) circumstantial factors, and (3) intentional activities. Lyubomirsky, Sheldon and Schkade suggest to make these changes in the correct way in order to have long-term happiness. Another suggestion of how to increase one's happiness is through a procedure called "Hope Training." Hope Training is primarily focused on hope due to the belief that hope drives the positive emotions of well-being. This training is based on the hope theory, which states that well-being can increase once people have developed goals and believe themselves to achieve those goals. One of the main purposes of hope training is to eliminate individuals from false hope syndrome. False hope syndrome particularly occurs when one believes that changing their behavior is easy and the outcomes of the change will be evidenced in a short period of time.

There are coaching procedures based on positive psychology, which are backed by scientific research, with availability of intervention tools and assessments that positive psychology trained coaches can utilize to support the coaching process. Positive psychology coaching uses scientific evidence and insights gained in these areas to work with clients in their goals.

==== Time and happiness ====
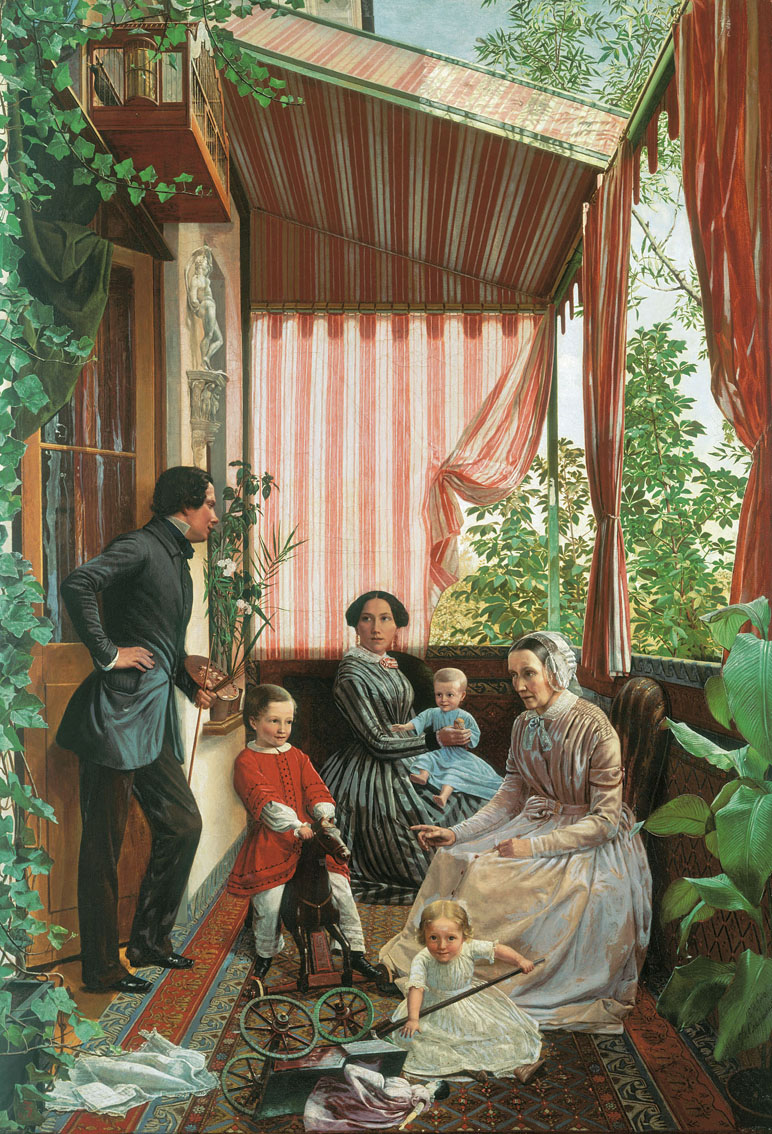
A portrait commemorating a family's day together

Philip Zimbardo suggests we might also analyze happiness from a "time perspective". He suggested the sorting of people's focus in life by valence (positive or negative) and also by their time perspective (past, present, or future orientation). Doing so may reveal some individual conflicts, not over whether an activity is enjoyed, but whether one prefers to risk delaying gratification further. Zimbardo also believes research reveals an optimal balance of perspectives for a happy life; commenting, our focus on reliving positive aspects of our past should be high, followed by time spent believing in a positive future, and finally spending a moderate (but not excessive) amount of time in enjoyment of the present.

=== The "flow" ===
In the 1970s Csikszentmihalyi started to study flow, a state of absorption where one's abilities are well-matched to the demands at-hand. Flow is characterized by intense concentration, loss of self-awareness, a feeling of being perfectly challenged (neither bored nor overwhelmed), and a sense "time is flying". Flow is intrinsically rewarding; it can also assist in the achievement of goals (e.g., winning a game) or improving skills (e.g., becoming a better chess player). Anyone can experience flow, in different domains, such as play, creativity, and work.

Flow is achieved when the challenge of the situation meets one's personal abilities. A mismatch of challenge for someone of low skills results in a state of anxiety; insufficient challenge for someone highly skilled results in boredom. The effect of challenging situations means that flow is often temporarily exciting and variously stressful, but this is considered eustress, which is also known as "good" stress. Eustress is arguably less harmful than chronic stress, although the pathways of stress-related systems are similar. Both can create a "wear and tear" effect; however, the differing physiological elements and added psychological benefits of eustress might well balance any wear and tear experienced.

Csikszentmihalyi identified nine indicator elements of flow: 1. Clear goals exist every step of the way, 2. Immediate feedback guides one's action, 3. There is a balance between challenges and abilities, 4. Action and awareness are merged, 5. Distractions are excluded from consciousness, 6. Failure is not worrisome, 7. Self-consciousness disappears, 8. Sense of time is distorted, and 9. The activity becomes "autotelic" (an end in itself, done for its own sake) His studies also show that flow is greater during work while happiness is greater during leisure activities.

=== Health ===
==== Addiction ====
Arguably, some people pursue ineffective shortcuts to feeling good. These shortcuts create positive feelings, but are problematic, in part because of the lack of effort involved. Some examples of these shortcuts include shopping, drugs, chocolate, loveless sex, and TV. These are problematic pursuits because all of these examples have the ability to become addictive. When happiness comes to us so easily, it comes with a price we may not realize. This price comes when taking these shortcuts is the only way to become happy, otherwise viewed as an addiction. A review by Amy Krentzman on the Application of Positive Psychology to Substance Use, Addiction, and Recovery Research, identified, in the field of positive psychology, three domains that allow an individual to thrive and contribute to society.

One of these, A Pleasant Life, involves good feelings about the past, present, and future. To tie this with addiction, they chose an example of alcoholism. Research on positive affect and alcohol showed a majority of the population associates drinking with pleasure. The pleasure one feels from alcohol is known as somatic pleasure, which is immediate but a short lived sensory delight. The researchers wanted to make clear pleasure alone does not amount to a life well lived; there is more to life than pleasure. Secondly, the Engaged Life is associated with positive traits such as strength of character. A few examples of character strength according to Character Strength and Virtues: A Handbook and Classification by Seligman and Peterson (2004) are bravery, integrity, citizenship, humility, prudence, gratitude, and hope, all of which are shown in the rise to recovery. Thirdly, the Meaningful Life is service and membership to positive organizations. Examples of positive organizations include family, workplace, social groups, and society in general. Membership of these groups fosters positive affect, while also promoting character strengths, which as seen in the Engaged Life, can aid in beating addiction.

==== Emotional health ====
Researcher Dianne Hales described an emotionally healthy person as someone who exhibits flexibility and adaptability to different circumstances, a sense of meaning and affirmation in life, an "understanding that the self is not the center of the universe", compassion and the ability to be unselfish, an increased depth and satisfaction in intimate relationships, and a sense of control over the mind and body.

==== Mental health ====
Layard and others show that the most important influence on happiness is mental health.

L.M. Keyes and Shane Lopez illustrate the four typologies of mental health functioning: flourishing, struggling, floundering and languishing. However, complete mental health is a combination of high emotional well-being, high psychological well-being, and high social well-being, along with low mental illness.

Although health is part of well-being, some people are able to maintain satisfactory wellbeing despite the presence of psychological symptoms.

==== Physical health ====
Meta-analyses published between 2013 and 2017 show that exercise is associated with reductions in depressive symptoms, fatigue and QoL plus improvements in attention, hyperactivity, impulsivity, social functioning, schizophrenic symptoms, and verbal fluency in various special populations. However, aerobic exercise has no significant effect on anxiety disorders.

In 2005 a study conducted by Andrew Steptow and Michael Marmot at University College London, found that happiness is related to biological markers that play an important role in health. The researchers aimed to analyze whether there was any association between well-being and three biological markers: heart rate, cortisol levels, and plasma fibrinogen levels. The participants who rated themselves the least happy had cortisol levels that were 48% higher than those who rated themselves as the most happy. The least happy subjects also had a large plasma fibrinogen response to two stress-inducing tasks: the Stroop test, and tracing a star seen in a mirror image. Repeating their studies three years later Steptow and Marmot found that participants who scored high in positive emotion continued to have lower levels of cortisol and fibrinogen, as well as a lower heart rate.

In Happy People Live Longer (2011), Bruno Frey reported that happy people live 14% longer, increasing longevity 7.5 to 10 years and Richard Davidson's bestseller (2012) The Emotional Life of Your Brain argues that positive emotion and happiness benefit long-term health.

However, in 2015 a study building on earlier research found that happiness has no effect on mortality. "This "basic belief that if you're happier you're going to live longer. That's just not true." Consistent results are that "apart from good health, happy people were more likely to be older, not smoke, have fewer educational qualifications, do strenuous exercise, live with a partner, do religious or group activities and sleep for eight hours a night."

Happiness does however seem to have a protective impact on immunity. The tendency to experience positive emotions was associated with greater resistance to colds and flu in interventional studies irrespective of other factors such as smoking, drinking, exercise, and sleep.

Positive emotional states have a favorable effect on mortality and survival in both healthy and diseased populations. Even at the same level of smoking, drinking, exercise, and sleep, happier people seem to live longer. Interventional trials conducted to establish a cause-effect relationship indicate positive emotions to be associated with greater resistance to objectively verifiable colds and flu.

==== Alternative medicine ====
Health consumers sometimes confuse the terms "wellness" and "well-being". Wellness is a term more commonly associated with alternative medicine which may or may not coincide with gains in subjective well-being. In 2014, the Australian Government reviewed the effectiveness of numerous complementary therapies: they found low-moderate quality evidence that the Alexander technique, Buteyko, massage therapy (remedial massage), tai chi and yoga are helpful for certain health conditions. On the other hand, the balance of evidence indicates that homeopathy, aromatherapy, bowen therapy, Feldenkrais, herbalism, iridology, kinesiology, pilates, reflexology and rolfing shiatsu were classed as ineffective.

==== Fruit and vegetable consumption ====
There is growing evidence that a diet rich in fruits and vegetables is related to greater happiness, life satisfaction, and positive mood as well. This evidence cannot be entirely explained by demographic or health variables including socio-economic status, exercise, smoking, and body mass index, suggesting a causal link. Further studies have found that fruit and vegetable consumption predicted improvements in positive mood the next day, not vice versa. On days when people ate more fruits and vegetables, they reported feeling calmer, happier, and more energetic than normal, and they also felt more positive the next day.

Cross-sectional studies worldwide support a relationship between happiness and fruit and vegetable intake. Those eating fruits and vegetables each day have a higher likelihood of being classified as "very happy," suggesting a strong and positive correlation between fruit and vegetable consumption and happiness. Whether it be in South Korea, Iran, Chile, USA, or UK, greater fruit and vegetable consumption had a positive association with greater happiness, independent of factors such as smoking, exercise, body mass index, and socio-economic factors. This could be due to the protective benefits from chronic diseases and a greater intake of nutrients important for psychological health.

Other food and drink practices associated with well-being are probiotics, alcohol, and binge drinking. Gluten and FODMAPs can negatively impact mood in some people. Bupa recommends oily fish, food with tryptophan such as milk, nuts, lentils, whole grain breads, cereals, pasta, soy and chocolate, dark chocolate, the Mediterranean diet overall including vegetables, fruits, whole grains, nuts and olive oil for wellbeing.

The documentary 'food matters' includes claims of well-being benefits of raw foods, which has been disputed as pseudoscience.

=== Hedonic well-being ===
Eudaimonic well-being has been found to be empirically distinguishable from hedonic well-being.

=== Identity ===
Individual roles play a part in cognitive well-being. Not only does having social ties improve cognitive well-being, it also improves psychological health.

Having multiple identities and roles helps individuals to relate to their society and provide the opportunity for each to contribute more as they increase their roles, therefore creating enhanced levels of cognitive well-being. Each individual role is ranked internally within a hierarchy of salience. Salience is "...the subjective importance that a person attaches to each identity".

Different roles an individual has have a different impact on their well-being. Within this hierarchy, higher roles offer more of a source to their well-being and define more meaningfulness to their overall role as a human being.

Ethnic identity may play a role in an individual's cognitive well-being. Studies have shown that "...both social psychological and developmental perspectives suggest that a strong, secure ethnic identity makes a positive contribution to cognitive well-being". Those in an acculturated society may feel more equal as a human being within their culture, therefore experiencing increased well-being.

=== Optimism and helplessness ===
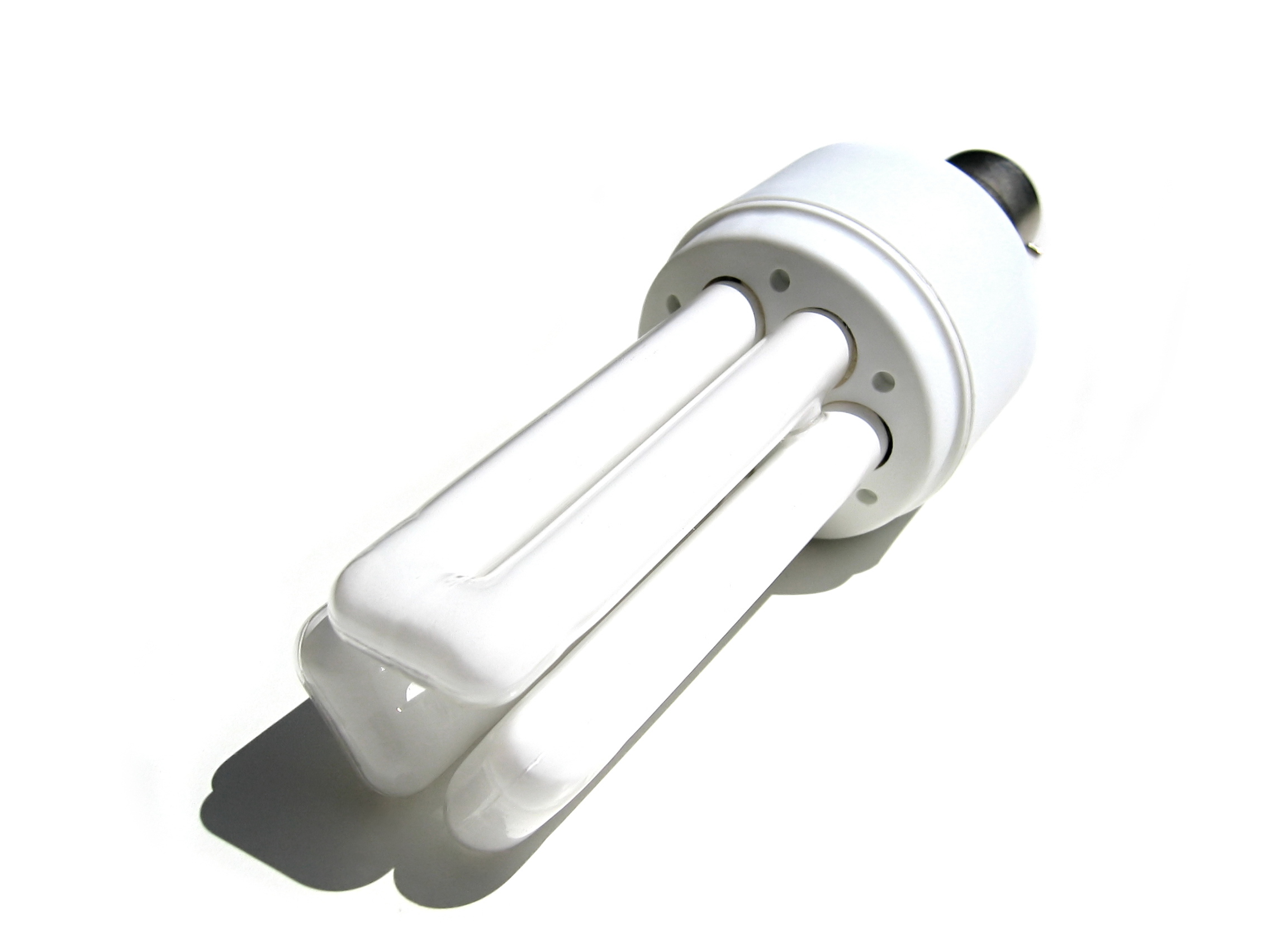
J.B. MacKinnon recommended taking full responsibility for one small, but clear improvement for the world (the way energy-saving activists did by promoting a new kind of lamp). Inspired by sociological research, MacKinnon said "vertical agitation" helps reduce feelings of helplessness.

Learned optimism refers to development of one's potential for a sanguine outlook. Optimism is learned as personal efforts and abilities are linked to personally desired outcomes. In short, it is the belief one can influence the future in tangible and meaningful ways. Learned optimism contrasts with learned helplessness, which consists of a belief, or beliefs, one has no control over what occurs, and that something external dictates outcomes, e.g., success. Optimism is learned by consciously challenging negative self talk. This includes self talk on any event viewed as a personal failure that permanently affects all areas of the person's life.

Intrapersonal, or internal, dialogues influence one's feelings. In fact, reports of happiness are correlated with the general ability to "rationalize or explain" social and economic inequalities. Hope is a powerful positive feeling, linked to a learned style of goal-directed thinking. Hope is fostered when a person utilizes both pathways thinking (the perceived capacity to find routes to desired goals) and agency thinking (the requisite motivations to use those routes).

Author and journalist J.B. MacKinnon suggested the cognitive tool of "Vertical Agitation" can assist in avoiding helplessness (e.g., paralysis in the face of Earth's many problems). The concept stemmed from research on denial by sociologist Stanley Cohen. Cohen explained: in the face of massive problems people tend towards learned helplessness rather than confronting the dissonant facts of the matter. Vertical Agitation involves focusing on one part of a problem at a time, while holding oneself accountable for solving the problem – all the way to the highest level of government, business and society (such as advocating strongly for something: eco-friendly lightbulbs). This allows each individual in society to make vital "trivial" (read: small) changes, without being intimidated by the work needed to be done as a whole. Mackinnon added: a piecemeal approach also keeps individuals from becoming too 'holier than thou' (harassing friends and family about every possible improvement), where widespread practice of Vertical Agitation would lead to much improvement.

=== Personal finance ===
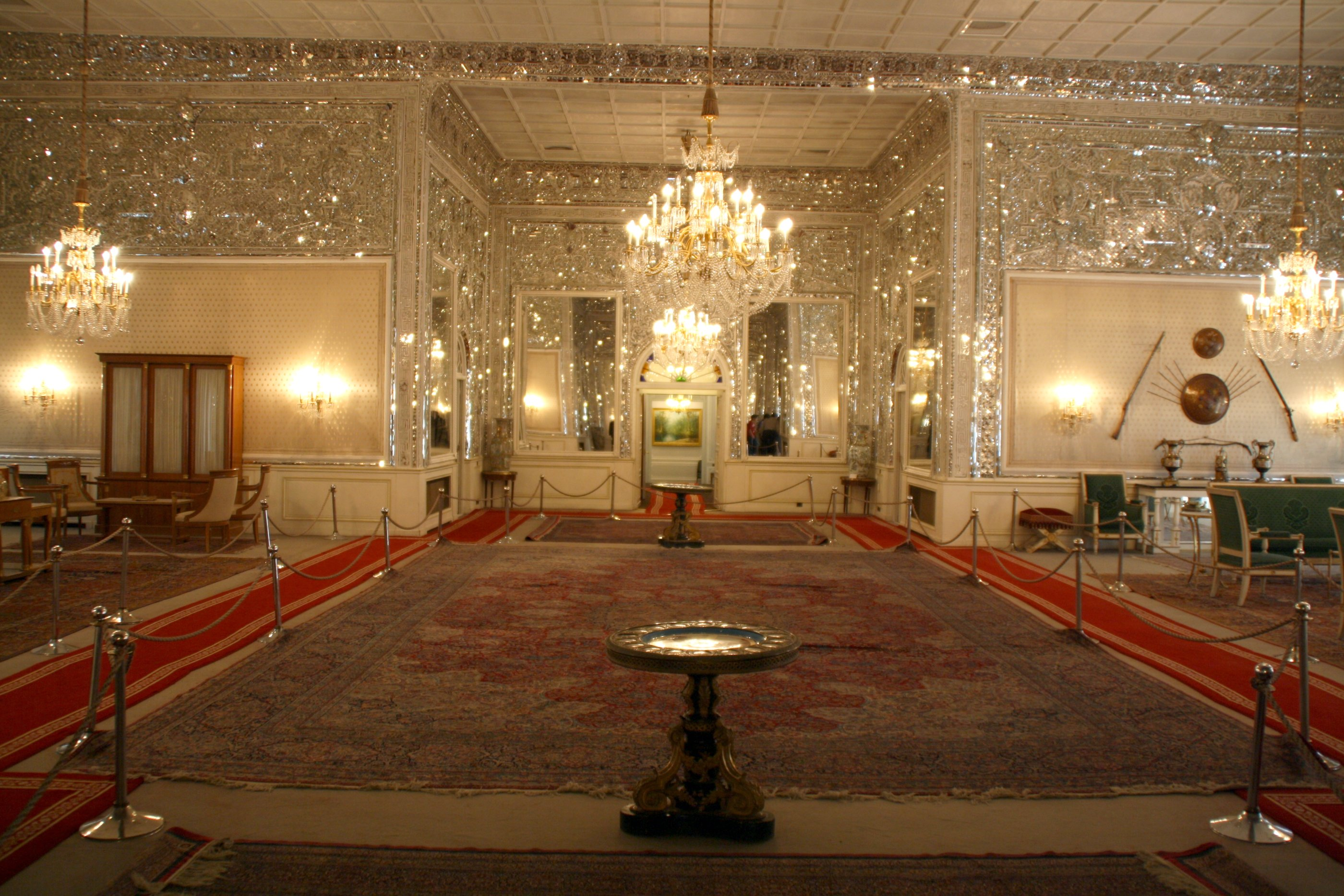
Money, once one reaches middle class, may be best spent ensuring one's job and social ties.

Well-being has traditionally focused on improving physical, emotional and mental quality of life with little understanding of how dependent they all are on financial health. However, financial stress often manifests itself in physical and emotional difficulties that lead to increased healthcare costs and reduced productivity. A more inclusive paradigm for well-being would acknowledge money as a source of empowerment that maximizes physical and emotional health by reducing financial stress. Such a model would provide individuals with the financial knowledge they need, as well as enable them to gain valuable insight and understanding regarding their financial habits, as well as their thoughts, feelings, fears and attitudes about money. Through this work, individuals would be better equipped to manage their money and achieve the financial wellness that is essential for their overall well-being.

It has been argued that money cannot effectively "buy" much happiness unless it is used in certain ways, and that "Beyond the point at which people have enough to comfortably feed, clothe, and house themselves, having more money – even a lot more money – makes them only a little bit happier." In his book Stumbling on Happiness, psychologist Daniel Gilbert described research suggesting money makes a significant difference to the poor (where basic needs are not yet met), but has a greatly diminished effect once one reaches middle class (i.e. the Easterlin paradox). Every dollar earned is just as valuable to happiness up to a $75,000 annual income, thereafter, the value of each additional dollar earns a diminishing amount of happiness. According to the latest systematic review of the economic literature on life satisfaction, one's perception of their financial circumstances fully mediates the effects of objective circumstances on one's well-being. People overestimate the influence of wealth by 100%.

Professor of Economics Richard Easterlin noted that job satisfaction does not depend on salary. In other words, having extra money for luxuries does not increase happiness as much as enjoying one's job or social network. Gilbert is thus adamant, people should go to great lengths to figure out which jobs they would enjoy, and to find a way to do one of those jobs for a living (that is, provided one is also attentive to social ties).

Unemployment is detrimental to individual well-being. However, that does not hold true in countries where unemployment is widespread. Psychology Today reports that the impact of unemployment is dampened in those for whom work is less central to their identity, those who receive less criticism and less negative judgments from others, those who can meet their immediate financial obligations and those who do not see their unemployment as high stress and negative. Other protective factors include the expectation of reemployment, routines that structure one's time and evaluating oneself as worthy, competent and successful. According to the latest systematic review of the economic literature on life satisfaction, unemployment is worse for wellbeing for those that are right wing or live in high income countries. Not all unemployment is bad, however: international data from sixteen Western countries indicates that retirement at any age yields large increases in subjective well-being that returns to trend by age 70.

Executive coaching, a workplace intervention for well-being and performance, is proven to work in certain contexts, according to a 2013 independent quantitative scientific summary synthesising high quality scientific research on coaching. It tells us that standard effect sizes for the outcomes of performance/skills, well-being, coping, goal-attainment and work/career attitudes range from 0.43 to 0.74.

A more recent study has challenged the Easterlin paradox. Using recent data from a broader collection of countries, a positive link was found between GDP and well-being; and there was no point at which wealthier countries' subjective well-being ceased to increase. It was concluded economic growth does indeed increase happiness.

Wealth is strongly correlated with life satisfaction but the correlation between money and emotional well-being is weak. The pursuit of money may lead people to ignore leisure time and relationships, both of which may cause and contribute to happiness. The pursuit of money at the risk of jeopardizing one's personal relationships and sacrificing enjoyment from one's leisure activities seems an unwise approach to finding happiness.

Money, or its hectic pursuit, has been shown to hinder people's savoring ability, or the act of enjoying everyday positive experiences and emotions. In a study looking at working adults, wealthy individuals reported lower levels of savoring ability (the ability to prolong positive emotion) relative to their poorer peers.

Studies have routinely shown that nations are happier when people's needs are met. Some studies suggest, however, that people are happier after spending money on experiences, rather than physical things, and after spending money on others, rather than themselves. However, purchases that buy 'time', for instance, cleaners or cooks typically increase individual well-being.

Lottery winners report higher levels of happiness immediately following the event. But research shows winner's happiness levels drop and return to normal baseline rates within months to years. This finding suggests money does not cause long-term happiness (1978). However, in a more recent British study on lottery prizes between £1,000 and £120,000, a positive effect even two years after the event was found, the return to normal being only partial and varying.

One 600 women strong 2011 study shows that house owners are no happier than renters. Degree of ownership also matter: "...housing property rights matter for subjective well-being. Specifically, using subjective well-being data from China, the authors find that homeownership is associated with higher levels of life satisfaction, although this happiness premium is larger for people who have full ownership compared to those who have only a minor ownership stake in their home." According to the latest systematic review of the economic literature on life satisfaction, living in rural areas seems to have some association with well-being, because the included studies tend to control for income and rural areas tend to be poor. Income has a high effect on happiness and incomes are higher in urban areas, so chasing a rural lifestyle at the expense of income may be a 'grass is always greener' move.

Adults who live with parents also tend to have poorer levels of well-being.

=== Mindfulness ===
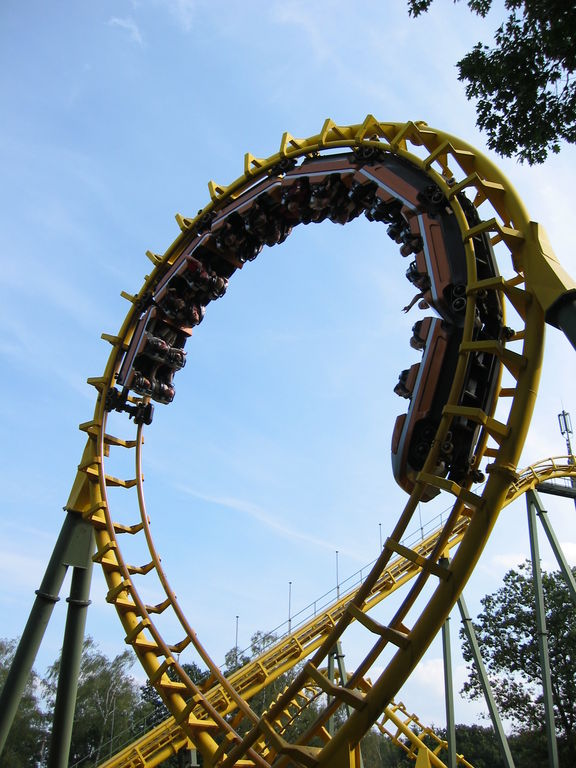
Researchers recommend attending to the past to find fond memories, and the future to find hope, but ultimately focussing mostly on the present. Daydreaming usually precedes drops in happiness. Mindfulness and activities that bring focus to the present (like roller coasters) may bring happiness partly by shifting people's focus away from the slightly saddening question "Am I happy?".

Mindfulness is an intentionally focused awareness of one's immediate experience. "Focused awareness" is a conscious moment-by-moment attention to situational elements of an experience: i.e., thoughts, emotions, physical sensations, and surroundings. An aim of mindfulness is to become grounded in the present moment; one learns to observe the arising and passing of experience. One does not judge the experiences and thoughts, nor do they try to "figure things out" and draw conclusions, or change anything – the challenge during mindfulness is to simply observe. Benefits of mindfulness practice include reduction of stress, anxiety, depression, and chronic pain. See also Reverence (emotion).

Ellen J. Langer argued people slip into a state of "mindlessness" by engaging in rote behavior, performing familiar, scripted actions without much cognition, as if on autopilot.

Advocates of focusing on present experiences also mention research by Psychologist Daniel Gilbert, who suggested daydreaming, instead of a focus on the present, may impede happiness. Fellow researcher, Matt Killingsworth, found evidence to support the harm of daydreaming. Fifteen thousand participants from around the world provided over 650 000 reports (using an online application on their phones that requested data at random times). Killingsworth found people who reported daydreaming soon reported less happiness; daydreaming is extremely common. Zimbardo (see "Time Perspectives" above) bestowed the merits of a present-focus, and recommended occasional recall of past positive experiences. Reflecting on past positive experiences can influence current mood, and assist in building positive expectations for the future.

There is research that suggests a person's focus influences level of happiness, where thinking too much about happiness can be counter-productive. Rather than asking: "Am I happy?" – which when posed just 4 times a day, starts to decrease happiness, it might well be better to reflect on one's values (e.g., "Can I muster any hope?"). Asking different questions can assist in redirecting personal thoughts, and perhaps, lead to taking steps to better apply one's energies. The personal answer to any particular question can lead to positive actions, and hopefulness, which is a very powerful, and positive feeling. Hopefulness is more likely to foster happiness, while feelings of hopelessness tend to undermine happiness.

Todd Kashdan, researcher and author of "Designing Positive Psychology", explained early science's findings should not be overgeneralized or adopted too uncritically. Mindfulness to Kashdan is very resource-intensive processing; he warned it is not simply better at all times. To illustrate, when a task is best performed with very little conscious thought (e.g., a paramedic performing practiced, emergency maneuvers). Nevertheless, development of the skill lends to its application at certain times, which can be useful for the reasons just described; Professor of Psychology and Psychiatry Richard J. Davidson highly recommends "mindfulness meditation" for use in the accurate identification and management of emotions.

=== Personality ===
The modifiable personality traits which might cause greater well-being have yet to be critically synthesised. However, there is evidence that certain traits are beneficial for individual happiness or performance: locus of control, curiosity, religiousness, spirituality, spiritual striving, sense of urgency, self-compassion, authenticity, growth mindset, positive mental attitudes, grit, goal orientation with a meta-analysis concluding that approach rather than avoidance goals are superior for performance; as well as prosocial rather than zero-sum goals.

Researchers who have reported on the character traits of people with high and low life satisfaction found that character strengths which predict life satisfaction are zest, curiosity, hope, and humour. Character strengths that do not predict life satisfaction include appreciation of beauty and excellence, creativity, kindness, love of learning, and perspective. Meanwhile, research on character strengths that is separated by gender indicates the character strengths that predict life satisfaction in men are humour, fairness, perspective, and creativity, while the character strengths that predict life satisfaction in women are zest, gratitude, hope, appreciation of beauty, and love.

Certain traits are specifically beneficial to those with certain health issues. Believing in yourself (high self efficacy) matters for eating disorders, immune response, stress management, pain management and healthy living.

In literature the positive psychological approach to personality is correlated often with the concepts of personal/psychosocial development and human development, balanced, strong, mature and proactive personality, character strengths and virtues, evidenced by traits like optimism and energy, pragmatism, active consciousness, assertiveness, free and powerful will, self-determination and self-realization, personal and social autonomy, social adaptability, personal and social efficiency, interpersonal development and professional development, proactive and positive thinking, humanity, empathy and love, emotional intelligence, subjective/psychological well-being, extraversion, happiness, positive emotions.

Many tools for psychological wellness have entered popular culture via the personal development and self help industry. Positive music, will lower distress and pain, but news media consumption is detrimental for happiness. One exception is motivational media, for it has been found that inspiration helps with creativity, productivity and happiness. Reading self help books is associated with higher well-being, however, there is poor evidence on life coaching. Proactive laughter as in laughter yoga increases mood and improves pain tolerance. Smiling increases attractiveness, calmness in stressful situations, retrieval of positive memories, likeability, happiness, perceived happiness (by others), perceived politeness/relaxedness/carefreeness, and perceived honesty but also perceived stupidity. However, proactively smiling only increases happiness among those who believe smiling is a reaction to feeling happy, rather than a positive intervention.

Ed Diener et al. (1999) suggested this equation: positive emotion – negative emotion = subjective well-being. Since tendency to positive emotion has a correlation of 0.8 with extroversion and tendency towards negative emotion is indistinguishable from neuroticism, the above equation could also be written as extroversion – neuroticism = happiness. These two traits could account for between 50% and 75% of happiness. These are all referring to the Big Five personality traits model of personality.

An emotionally stable (the opposite of Neurotic) personality correlates well with happiness. Not only does emotional stability make one less prone to negative emotions, it also predicts higher social intelligence – which helps to manage relationships with others (an important part of being happy, discussed below).

Cultivating an extroverted temperament may correlate with happiness for the same reason: it builds relationships and support groups. Some people may be fortunate, from the standpoint of personality theories that suggest individuals have control over their long-term behaviors and cognitions. Genetic studies indicate genes for personality (specifically extroversion, neuroticism and conscientiousness), and a general factor linking all 5 traits, account for the heritability of subjective well-being. Recent research suggests there is a happiness gene, the 5-HTT gene.

=== Purpose in life ===
Purpose in life refers broadly to the pursuit of life satisfaction. It has also been found that those with high purpose in life scores have strong goals and sense of direction. They feel there is meaning to their past and present life, and hold beliefs that continue to give their life purpose. Research in the past has focused on purpose in the face of adversity (what is awful, difficult, or absurd in life). Recently, research has shifted to include a focus on the role of purpose in personal fulfillment and self-actualization.

The self-control approach, as expounded by C. R. Snyder, focusses on exercising self-control to achieve self-esteem by fulfilling goals and feeling in control of our own success. This is further reinforced by a sense of intentionality in both efforts and outcomes.

The intrinsic motivation approach of Viktor Frankl emphasized finding value in three main areas: creative, experiential, and attitudinal. Creative values are expressed in acts of creating or producing something. Experiential values are actualized through the senses, and may overlap the hedonistic view of happiness. Attitudinal values are prominent for individuals who are unable to pursue the preceding two classes of values. Attitudinal values are believed to be primarily responsible for allowing individuals to endure suffering with dignity.

A personal sense of responsibility is required for the pursuit of the values that give life meaning, but it is the realization that one holds sole responsibility for rendering life meaningful that allows the values to be actualized and life to be given true purpose. Determining what is meaningful for one's self provides a sense of autonomy and control which promotes self-esteem.

Purpose in life is positively correlated with education level and volunteerism. However, it has also been found to decrease with age. Purpose in life is both highly individual, and what specifically provides purpose will change over the course of one's lifetime.

All three of the above theories have self-esteem at their core. Self-esteem is often viewed as the most significant measure of psychological well-being, and highly correlated with many life-regulating skills. Purpose in life promotes and is a source of self-esteem; it is not a by-product of self-esteem.

=== Self-efficacy ===
Self-efficacy refers to a belief that one's ability to accomplish a task is a function of personal effort. Low self-efficacy, or a disconnect between ability and personal effort, is associated with depression; by comparison, high self-efficacy is associated with positive change, including overcoming abuse, overcoming eating disorders, and maintaining a healthy lifestyle. High self-efficacy also has positive benefits for one's immune system, aids in stress management, and decreases pain. A related concept, Personal effectiveness, is primarily concerned with planning and the implementation of methods of accomplishment.

=== Sports ===
According to Bloodworth and McNamee sports and physical activities are a key contributor to the development of people's well-being. The influence of sports on well-being is conceptualized within a framework which includes impermanence, its hedonistic shallowness and its epistemological inadequacy. Researching the effect of sport on well-being is difficult as some societies are unable to access sports, a deficiency in studying this phenomenon.

=== Suffering ===
Research has shown it is possible to help suffering people by building their strengths. In addition, prevention researchers have discovered strengths act as buffers against mental illness. The strengths that represent major strides in prevention include: courage, future mindedness, optimism, faith, work ethic, hope, honesty, perseverance, and the capacity for flow and insight.

Suffering can indicate behavior worthy of change, as well as ideas that require a person's careful attention and consideration. Generally, psychology acknowledges suffering can not be eliminated, but it is possible to successfully manage and reduce suffering. The University of Pennsylvania's Positive Psychology Center explains: "Psychology's concern with remedying human problems is understandable and should certainly not be abandoned. Human suffering demands scientifically informed solutions. Suffering and well being, however, are both part of the human condition, and psychologists should be concerned with both." Positive psychology, inspired by empirical evidence, focuses on productive approaches to pain and suffering, as well the importance of cultivating strengths and virtues to keep suffering to a minimum (see also Character strengths and virtues (book)).

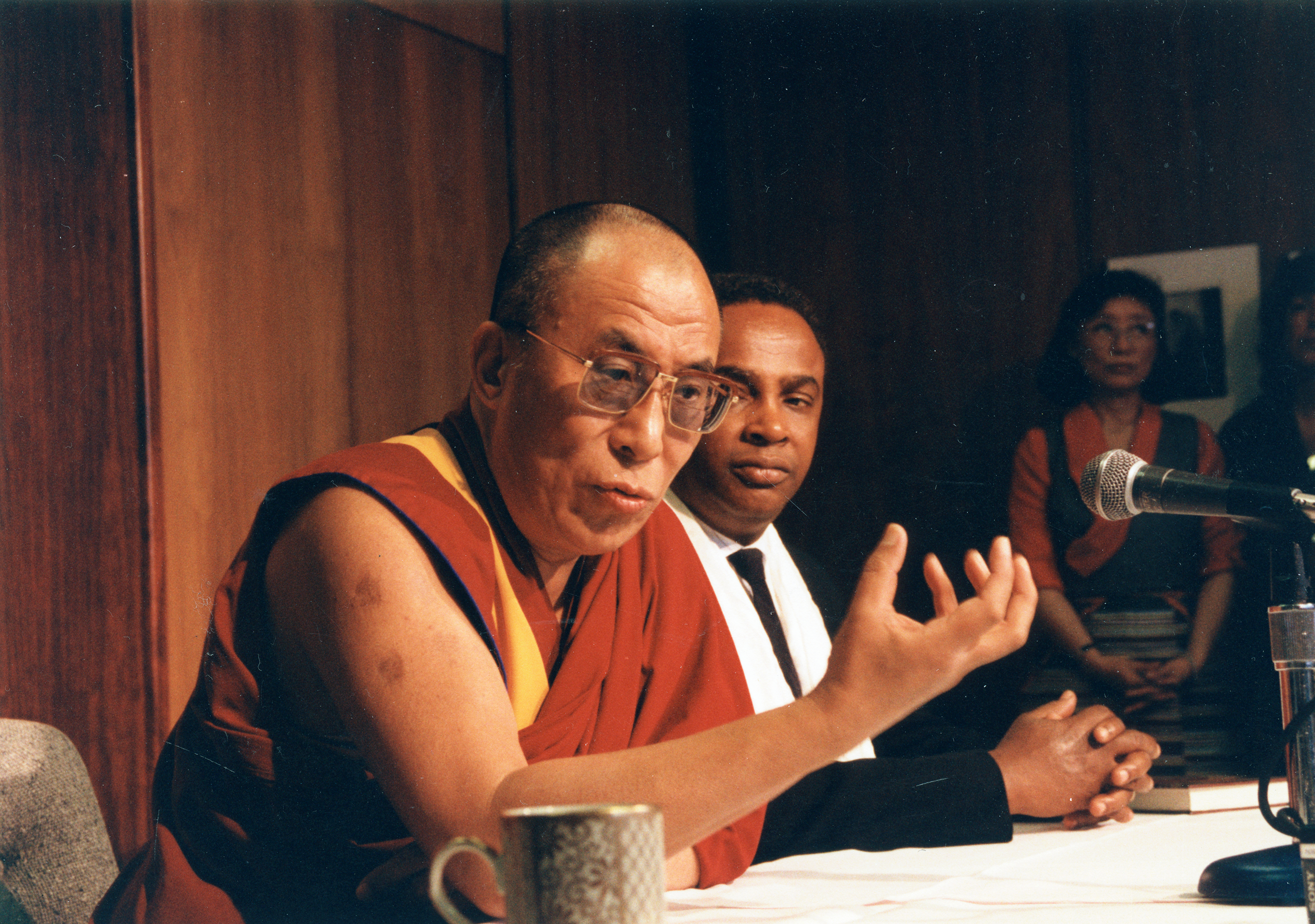
According to Peterson, the Buddhist saying that "life is suffering" can be understood as a reality that humans must accept, as well as a call to cultivate virtues.

In reference to the Buddhist saying "Life is suffering", researcher and clinical psychologist Jordan Peterson suggested this view as realistic, not pessimistic, where acceptance of the reality life is harsh, provides a freedom from the expectation one should always be happy. This realization can assist in the management of inevitable suffering. To Peterson, virtues are important because they provide people with essential tools to escape suffering (e.g., the strength to admit dissonant truths to themselves). Peterson maintained suffering is made worse by false philosophy (i.e., denial that natural suffering is inevitable).

Similarly, Seligman believes positive psychology is "not a luxury", saying "most of Positive Psychology is for all of us, troubled or untroubled, privileged or in privation, suffering or carefree. The pleasures of a good conversation, the strength of gratitude, the benefits of kindness or wisdom or spirituality or humility, the search for meaning and the antidote to "fidgeting until we die" are the birthrights of us all."

Positive coping is defined as "a response aimed at diminishing the physical, emotional, and psychological burden that is linked to stressful life events and daily hassles" It is found that proper coping strategies will reduce the burden of short-term stress and will help relieve long-term stress. Stress can be reduced by building resources that inhibit or buffer future challenges. For some people, these effective resources could be physiological, psychological or social.

=== Terror management ===
Terror management theory maintains that people suffer cognitive dissonance (anxiety) when they are reminded of their inevitable death. Through terror management, individuals are motivated to seek consonant elements – symbols which make sense of mortality and death in satisfactory ways (i.e. boosting self-esteem).

Research has found that strong belief in religious or secular meaning systems affords psychological security and hope. It is moderates (e.g. agnostics, slightly religious individuals) who likely suffer the most anxiety from their meaning systems. Religious meaning systems are especially adapted to manage anxiety about death or dying because they are unlikely to be disconfirmed (for various reasons), they are all encompassing, and they promise literal immortality.

Whether emotional effects are beneficial or adverse seems to vary with the nature of the belief. Belief in a benevolent God is associated with lower incidence of general anxiety, social anxiety, paranoia, obsession, and compulsion whereas belief in a punitive God is associated with greater symptoms. (An alternative explanation is that people seek out beliefs that fit their psychological and emotional states.)

Citizens of the world's poorest countries are the most likely to be religious, and researchers suggest this is because of religion's powerful coping abilities. Luke Galen also supports terror management theory as a partial explanation of the above findings. Galen describes evidence (including his own research) that the benefits of religion are due to strong convictions and membership in a social group.

== Relational factors ==
=== Love and caring ===
The capacity for loving attachments and relationships, especially with parents, is the strongest predictor of well-being later in life.

=== Marriage ===
Seligman writes: "Unlike money, which has at most a small effect, marriage is robustly related to happiness... In my opinion, the jury is still out on what causes the proven fact married people are happier than unmarried people." (pp. 55–56). Married persons report higher levels of happiness and well-being than single people. Other data has shown a spouse's happiness depends on the happiness of their partner. When asked, spouses reported similar happiness levels to each other. The data also shows the spouses' happiness level fluctuates similarly to one another. If the husband is having a bad week, the wife will similarly report she had a bad week.

There is little data on alternatives like polyamory, although one study stated wife order in polygyny did not have a substantial effect on life or marital satisfaction over all. This study also found younger wives were happier than older wives.

On the other hand, at least one large study in Germany found no difference in happiness between married and unmarried people.

Studies have shown that married couples are consistently happier and more satisfied with their life than those who are single. Some research findings have indicated that marriage is the only real significant bottom-up predictor of life satisfaction for men and women, and that those people who have a higher life satisfaction prior to marriage, tend to have a happier marriage.

Self-reported satisfaction typically drops as the years of marriage roll on, particularly for couples who have children compared to those who do not. The reasons for this decline include a drop in affectionate behaviour. One team of researcher from Northwestern University who summarised the literature in 2013, identifies that this trend does not reverse throughout the marital period.

Surprisingly, there has been a steady decline in the positive relationship between marriage and well-being in the United States since the 1970s. This decline is due to women reporting being less happy than previously and single men reporting being happier than previously. Research does exist, however, suggesting that compared to single people, married people have better physical and psychological health and tend to live longer.

With this, a two-factor theory of love was developed by Barnes and Sternberg. This theory is composed of two components: passionate love and companionate love. Passionate love is considered to be an intense longing for a loved one. This love is often experienced through joy and sexual fulfillment, or even through rejection. On the other hand, companionate love is associated with affection, friendship and commitment. Stutzer and Frey (2006) found that the absence of loneliness and the emotional support that promotes self-esteem are both important aspects that contribute to individual well-being within marriage. Both passionate and companionate love are the foundations for every variety of love that one may experience. When passionate and companionate love are compromised in a marital relationship, satisfaction is decreased and the likelihood of divorce increases. In other words, the lack of positive support and validation increases the risk for divorce.

Because of the expansive research done on the significance of social support within a marriage, it is important to understand that this research was inspired by a theory called the attachment theory perspective. Attachment theory stresses the importance of support and care giving in a relationship for the development of trust and security. Attachment theory, as conceptualized by Collins and Feeney (2000) is an interpersonal, transactional process that involves one partners caregiving responses.

=== Parenthood ===
While the mantle of parenting is sometimes held as the necessary path of adulthood, study findings are actually mixed as to whether parents report higher levels of happiness relative to non-parents. Folk wisdom suggests a child brings partners closer; research has found couples actually become less satisfied after the birth of the first child. The joys of having a child are overshadowed by the responsibilities of parenthood. Based on quantitative self-reports, researchers found parents prefer doing almost anything else to looking after their children. By contrast, parents' self-report levels of happiness are higher than those of non-parents. This may be due to already happy people having more children than unhappy people. In addition, it might also be that, in the long-term, having children gives more meaning to life. One study found having up to three children increased happiness among married couples, but not among other groups with children. Proponents of Childfreedom maintain this is because one can enjoy a happy, productive life without the trouble of ever being a parent. In a research study by Pollmann-Schult (2014) on 13,093 Germans, it was found that when finances and time costs are held constant, parents are happier and show increased life satisfaction than non-parents.

By contrast, many studies found having children makes parents less happy. Compared with non-parents, parents with children have lower levels of well-being and life satisfaction until children move out of the household, at which point parents have higher well-being and satisfaction. In addition, parents report more feelings of depression and anxiety than non-parents. However, when adults without children are compared to empty nest parents, parenthood is positively associated with emotional well-being. People found parenthood to be more stressful in the 1970s than they did in the 1950s. This is thought to be because of social changes in regards to employment and marital status.

Males apparently become less happy after the birth of a child due to added economic pressure and taking on the role of being a parent. A conflict between partners can arise when the couple does not desire traditional roles, or has an increasing number of roles. Unequal responsibilities of child-rearing between men and women account for this difference in satisfaction. Fathers who worked and shared an equal part in child-raising responsibilities were found to be the least satisfied. Research shows that single parents have higher levels of distress and report more mental health problems than married persons.

Researchers implemented the Huta & Ryan Scale: Four Eudaimonic Measurement Questionnaire to analyze the participants eudaimonic motives, through motivation towards activities. The investigation was conducted on Canadian university undergraduates. The four eudaimonic pursuits as described by Huta & Ryan are:

1. "Seeking to pursue excellence or a personal ideal"
2. "Seeking to use the best in yourself"
3. "Seeking to develop a skill, learn, or gain insight into something"
4. "Seeking to do what you believe in".

The study determined that participants derived well-being from eudaimonic pursuits only if their parents had role modeled eudaimonia, but not if their parents had merely verbally endorsed eudaimonia.

Studies were also conducted on responsiveness and demandingness. The studies participants were American university undergraduates. The terms are described as follows; responsiveness satisfies the basic psychological need for autonomy. This is relevant to eudaimonia because it supports and implements the values of initiative, effort, and persistence, and integration of one's behaviour's values, and true-self. Autonomy is an important psychological factor because it provides the individual with independence. Demandingness cultivates many of the qualities needed for eudaimonia, including structure, self-discipline, responsibility, and vision. Responsiveness and demandingness are reported to be good aspects of parenting. The studies report both of these qualities as important factors to well-being.

The study addressed parenting style by assessing and using adaptions of Baumrind's Parent Behaviour Rating Interview. Adaptions of this interview were made into a seventy-five question based survey; participants answered questions organized into fifteen subscales. The study determined that eudaimonically oriented participants reported their parents had been both demanding and responsive towards them. A multiple regression showed that demandingness and responsiveness together explained as much as twenty-eight percent of the variance in eudaimonia, this suggests parenting played a major role in the development of this pursuit. This supported the expectation that eudaimonia is cultivated when parents encourage internal structure, self-discipline, responsibility, and vision, and simultaneously fulfill a child's needs for autonomy. The research concludes that parents who want their children to experience eudaimonia must firstly themselves "mentor" their children in the approaches to attain eudaimonia. To encourage eudaimonia verbally is not sufficient to suffice eudaimonia into adulthood. Parents must clearly role model eudaimonia for it to truly be present in the child's life.

=== Social ties ===
In the article "Finding Happiness after Harvard", George Vaillant concluded a study on what aspects of life are important for "successful living". In the 1940s, Arlie Bock, while in charge of the Harvard Health Services, started a study, selecting 268 Harvard students from graduating classes of 1942, '43, and '44. He sought to identify the aspects of life contributing to "successful living". In 1967, the psychiatrist George Vaillant continued the study, undertaking follow-up interviews to gauge the lives of many of the students. In 2000, Vaillant again interviewed these students as to their progress in life. Vaillant observed: health, close relationships, and how participants dealt with their troubles. Vaillant found a key aspect to successful living is healthy and strong relationships.

A widely publicized study from 2008 in the British Medical Journal reported happiness in social networks may spread from person to person. Researchers followed nearly 5000 individuals for 20 years in the long-standing Framingham Heart Study and found clusters of happiness and unhappiness that spread up to 3 degrees of separation on average. Happiness tended to spread through close relationships like friends, siblings, spouses, and next-door neighbors; researchers reported happiness spread more consistently than unhappiness through the network. Moreover, the structure of the social network appeared to affect happiness, as people who were very central (with many friends, and friends of friends) were significantly happier than those on the network periphery. People closer with others are more likely to be happy themselves. Overall, the results suggest happiness can spread through a population like a virus. Having a best friend buffers one's negative life experiences. When one's best friend is present Cortisol levels are decreased and feelings of self-worth increase.

Neuroeconomist Paul Zak studies morality, oxytocin, and trust, among other variables. Based on research findings, Zak recommends: people hug others more often to get into the habit of feeling trust. He explains "eight hugs a day, you'll be happier, and the world will be a better place".

Recently, Anderson et al. found that sociometric status (the amount of respect one has from face-to-face peer group) is significantly and causally related to happiness as measured by subjective well-being.

== Institutional factors ==
=== Education ===
==== Education and intelligence ====
Research suggests neither a good education nor a high IQ reliably increases happiness. Anders Ericsson argued an IQ above 120 has a decreasing influence on success. Presumably, IQs above 120 do not additionally cause other happiness indicators like success (with the exception of careers like Theoretical physics, where high IQs are more predictive of success). Above that IQ level, other factors, like social skills and a good mentor, matter more. As these relate to happiness, intelligence and education may simply allow one to reach a middle-class level of need satisfaction (as mentioned above, being richer than this seems to hardly affect happiness). According to the findings of the study, Using Theatrical Concepts for Role-plays with Educational Agents by Klesen, she expresses how role- playing embeds information and educational goals and causes people to learn unintentionally. Studies have shown that enjoyment in things as simple as role playing increases a person's IQ and their happiness.

Martin Seligman has said: "As a professor, I don't like this, but the cerebral virtues—curiosity, love of learning—are less strongly tied to happiness than interpersonal virtues like kindness, gratitude and capacity for love."

=== Educational goals ===
John White (2013) investigated the educational goals at public schools in Britain. School-education involves both cognitive and conceptual learning, but also the development social skills and personal development. Ideally, children develop self-confidence, and create purpose for themselves. According to White, in the past schools only focused on knowledge and education but now Britain has moved to a broader direction. White's Every Child Matters initiative seeks to enhance children's well-being across the range of children's services.

==== Physical education ====
Positive psychology aims to improve the quality of experiences. Within its framework, students could learn to become excited about physical activity. Playing comes naturally to children; positive psychology seeks to preserve this zest (a sense of excitement and motivation for life) for movement in growing and developing children. If offered in an interesting, challenging and pleasurable way, physical activity could internalize a feeling of happiness in students. Positive psychology's approach to physical activity could give students the means of acquiring an engaged, pleasant and meaningful life.

==== School education ====
Positive psychology is beneficial to schools and students because it encourages individuals to strive to do their best, whereas scolding has the opposite effect. Clifton and Rath discussed research conducted by Dr. Elizabeth Hurlock in 1925, where fourth, fifth and sixth graders were either praised, criticized or ignored, based on their work on math problems. Praised students improved by 71%, those criticized improved by 19%, and students provided with no feedback improved a mere 5%. Praise seems an effective method of fostering improvement.

According to Clifton and Rath ninety nine out of one hundred people prefer the influence of positive people. The benefits include: increased productivity, and contagious positive emotions, which assists one in working to the best of their abilities. Even a single negative person can ruin the entire positive vibe in an environment. Clifton and Rath cited 'positive emotions as an essential daily requirement for survival'.

In 2008, in conjunction with the Positive Psychology Center at the University of Pennsylvania, a whole-of-school implementation of Positive Psychology was undertaken by Geelong Grammar School (Victoria, Australia). This involved training of teaching staff in the principles and skills of positive psychology. Ongoing support was provided by The Positive Psychology Center staff, who remained in-residence for the entire year.

Staats, Hupp and Hagley (2008) used positive psychology to explore academic honesty. They identified positive traits displayed by heroes, then determined if the presence of these traits in students predicted future intent to cheat. The results of their research: 'an effective working model of heroism in the context of the academic environment' (Staats, Hupp & Hagley, 2008).

==== School grades of children ====
According to a study reported in the NY Post newspaper, 48% of parents reward their children's good grades with cash or something else of meaning. Among many families in the United States, this is controversial. Although psychology experts support the offer of reward for good behavior as a better alternative than the use of punishment for bad behavior, in some circumstances, families cannot afford to give their children an average of 16 dollars for every good grade earned. Alternatives for money include allowing a child extra time on a computer or staying up later than usual. Some psychology experts believe the best reward is praise and encouragement because material rewards can cause long-term negative effects for children.

A study, regarding rewards for children, conducted in 1971 by psychologist, Edward L. Deci, at the University of Rochester, is still referenced today. Featured in the New York Times, it focused on the short- and long-term effects of rewards for positive behavior. Deci suggested rewards for positive behavior is an effective incentive for only a short period. At the outset, rewards can support motivation to work hard and strive towards personal goals. However, once rewards cease, children showed less interest in the task relative to participants who never received rewards. Deci pointed out, at a young age, children's natural instinct is to resist people who try to control their behavior, which he cited as support for his conclusion rewards for good behavior have limited effectiveness.

In contrast, the New York Times featured research findings that supported the merits of offering rewards to children for good behavior. Expert economists argued children experiencing trouble with their behavior or schoolwork should have numerous helpful options, including rewards. Although children might well experience an initial attraction to financial or material, a love for learning could develop subsequently. Despite the controversy regarding the use of rewards, some experts believe the best way to motivate a child is to offer rewards at the beginning of the school year, but if unsuccessful they recommend teachers and parents stop using the reward system. Because of individual differences among children, no one method will work for everyone. Some children respond well to the use of rewards for positive behavior, while others evidence negative effects. The results seem to depend on the person.

==== Youth development ====
Positive youth development focuses on the promotion of healthy development rather than viewing youth as prone to problems needing to be addressed. This is accomplished through programs and efforts by communities, schools, and government agencies.

=== Work ===
It has been argued that happiness at work is one of the driving forces behind positive outcomes at work, rather than just being a resultant product.

Despite a large body of positive psychological research into the relationship between happiness and productivity, happiness at work has traditionally been seen as a potential by-product of positive outcomes at work, rather than a pathway to success in business. However a growing number of scholars, including Boehm and Lyubomirsky, argue that it should be viewed as one of the major sources of positive outcomes in the workplace.

==== Human Resource Management ====
A practical application of positive psychology is to assist individuals and organizations in identifying strengths so as to increase and sustain well-being. Therapists, counselors, coaches, various psychological professionals, HR departments, business strategists, and others, are using new methods and techniques to broaden and build upon the strengths of a wide population of individuals. This includes those not suffering from mental illness or disorder.

==== Workplace ====
Positive psychology has been implemented in business management practice, but has faced challenges. Wong & Davey (2007) noted managers can introduce positive psychology to a workplace, but they might struggle with positive ways to apply it to employees. Furthermore, for employees to welcome and commit to positive psychology, its application within an organization must be transparent. Managers must also understand the implementation of positive psychology will not necessarily combat any commitment challenges that exist. However, with its implementation employees might become more optimistic and open to new concepts or management practices.

In their article "The Benefits of Frequent Positive Affect: Does Happiness Lead to Success?", S. Lyubomirsky et al. report: "Study after study shows that happiness precedes important outcomes and indicators of thriving, including fulfilling and productive work".

Positive psychology, when applied correctly, can provide employees with a greater opportunity to use skills and vary work duties. However, changing work conditions and roles can lead to stress among employees if they are improperly supported by management. This is particularly true for employees who must meet the expectations of organizations with unrealistic goals and targets. Thomas and Tasker (2010) showed less worker autonomy, fewer opportunities for development, less-enriched work roles, and lower levels of supervisor support reflected the effect of industry growth on job satisfaction.

Can an organization implement positive change? Lewis et al. (2007) developed appreciative inquiry (AI), which is an integrated, organizational-level methodology for approaching organizational development. Appreciative inquiry is based on the generation of organizational resourcefulness, which is accomplished by accessing a variety of human psychological processes, such as: positive emotional states, imagination, social cohesion, and the social construction of reality.

A relatively new practice in the workplace is recruiting and developing people based on their strengths (what they love to do, are naturally good at and energises them). Standard Chartered Bank pioneered this approach in the early 2000s. More and more organisations are realising the benefit of recruiting people who are in their element in the job as opposed to simply having the right competencies for the job. Aviva, Morrisons (a large UK supermarket) and Starbucks have all adopted this approach.

Psychologist Howard Gardner has extensively researched the merit of undertaking good work at one's job. He suggested young generations (particularly in the United States) are taught to focus on the selfish pursuit of money for its own sake, although having money does not engender happiness, and psychological studies show that there is a strong correlation between the wealthy and experience of intensively negative emotions. Gardner's proposed alternatives loosely follow the pleasant/good/meaningful life classifications outlined above; he believes young people should be trained to pursue excellence in their field, as well as engagement (see flow, above) in accordance with their moral belief systems.

== Societal factors ==
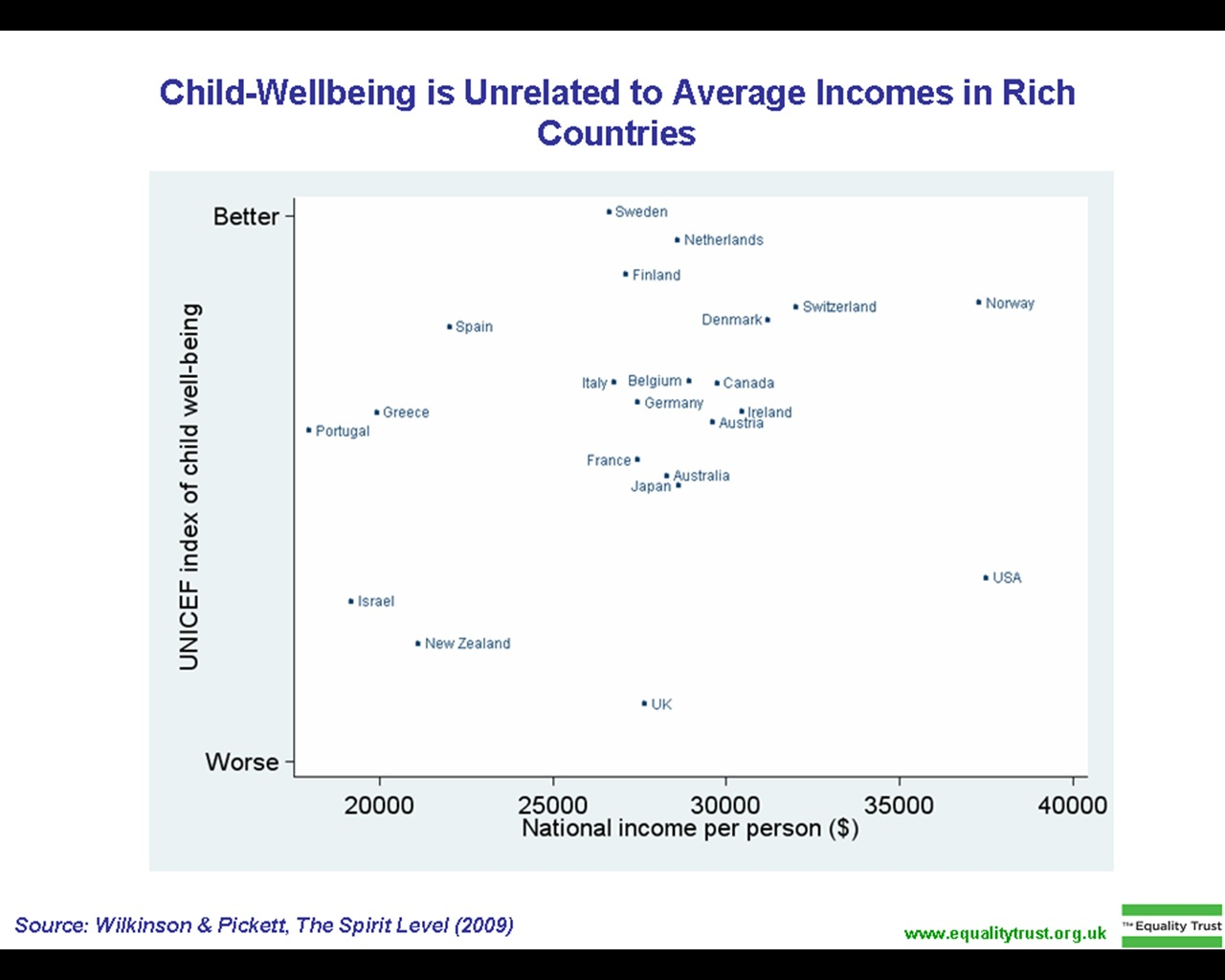
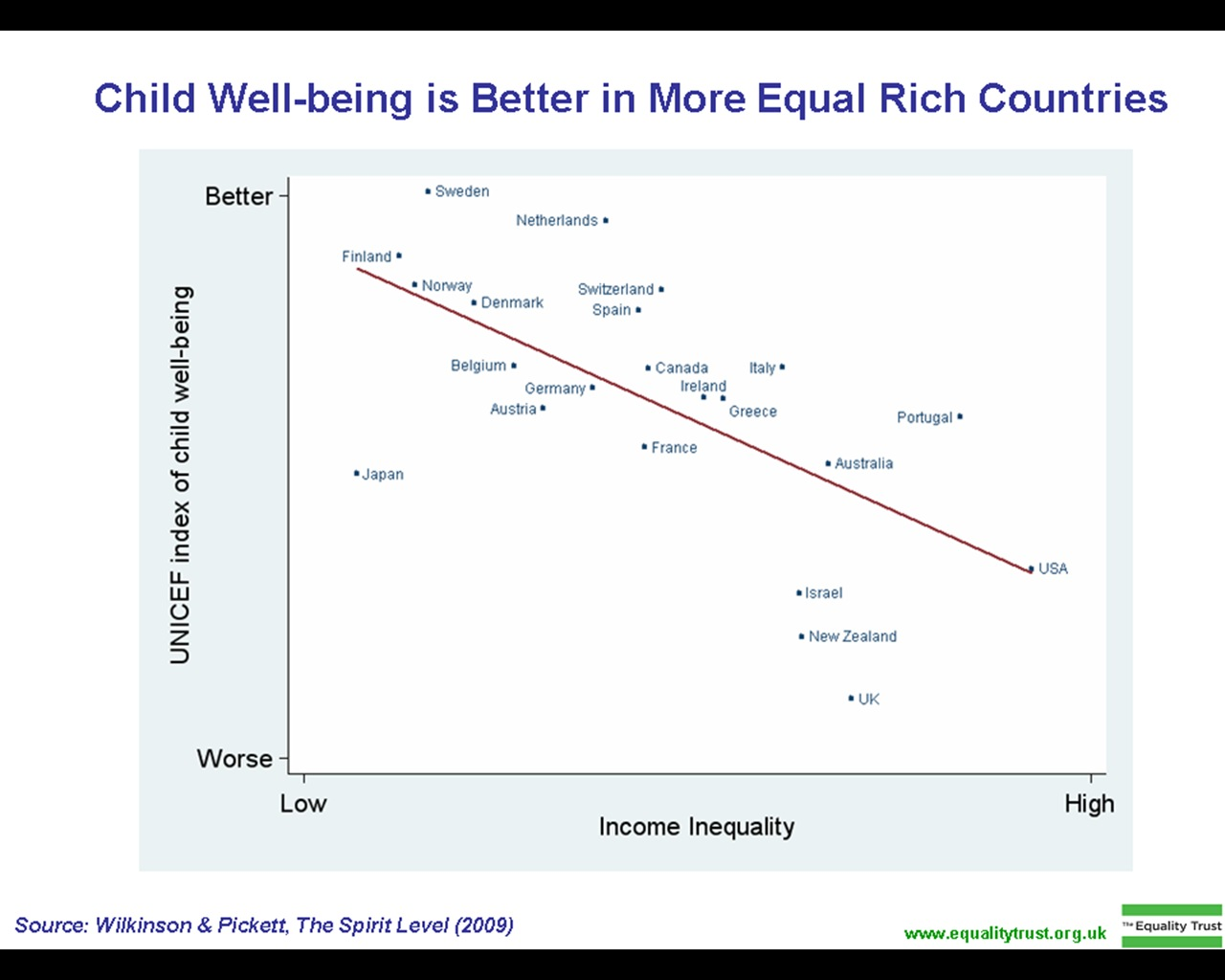
Child well-being is unrelated to the average income in rich countries, but is better in the countries with low economic inequality.

=== Criminology ===
==== Offender rehabilitation ====
Traditional work with offenders has focused on their deficits (e.g., with respect to socialization, and schooling) and other "criminogenic" risk-factors. Rehabilitation more often than not has taken the form of forced treatment or training, ostensibly for the good of the offender, and the community. Arguably, this approach has shortcomings, suggesting a need to make available additional positive options to treatment staff so they can best assist offenders, and so that offenders can better find their way forward. Positive psychology has made recent inroads with the advent of the "Good Lives Model", developed by Tony Ward, Shadd Maruna, and others. With respect to rehabilitation: "Individuals take part ... because they think that such activities might either improve the quality of their life (an intrinsic goal) or at least look good to judges, parole boards and family members (an extrinsic goal)."

==== Positive criminology and positive victimology ====
Positive criminology and positive victimology are conceptual approaches, developed by the Israeli criminologist Natti Ronel and his research team, that follow principles of positive psychology and apply them into the fields of criminology and victimology, respectively. Positive criminology and victimology both place an emphasis on social inclusion and on unifying and integrating forces at individual, group, social and spiritual levels that are associated with the limiting of crime and recovery from victimization. In traditional approaches, the study of crime, violence and related behaviors emphasizes the negative aspects in people's lives that are associated with deviance, criminality and victimization. A common understanding is that human relationships are affected more by destructive encounters than by constructive or positive ones. Positive criminology and victimology argue that a different approach is viable, based on three dimensions – social integration, emotional healing and spirituality – that constitute positive direction indicators.

=== Economics ===
In economics, the term well-being is used for one or more quantitative measures intended to assess the quality of life of a group, for example, in the capabilities approach and the economics of happiness. As with the related cognate terms 'wealth' and 'welfare', economics sources often contrast the state with its opposite. The study of well-being is divided into subjective well-being and objective well-being.

=== Political views ===
Psychologists in the happiness community feel politics should promote population happiness. Politics should also consider level of human happiness among future generations, concern itself with life expectancy, and focus on the reduction of suffering. Based on political affiliation, some studies argue conservatives, on average, are happier than liberals. A potential explanation is greater acceptance of income inequalities in society leads to a less worried nature. Luke Galen, Associate Professor of Psychology at Grand Valley State University, mentioned political commitments as important because they are a sort of secular world view that, like religion, can be generally beneficial to coping with death anxiety (see also Terror management theory and religion and happiness).

== Environmental factors ==
Living in an environment with more green spaces is associated with higher well-being, partly due to the beneficial effects on psychological relaxation, stress alleviation, increased physical activity, and reduced exposure to air pollutants and noise, among others. According to the latest systematic review of the economic literature on life satisfaction, pollution is bad for one's well-being. Exposure to outdoor air pollution and chimney smoke fireplaces causes dementia and other-health risks. Climate change mitigation measures have mostly positive direct effects on human well-being.

== Cultural factors ==
=== Culture ===
People base their own well-being in relation to their environment and the lives of others around them. Well-being is also subject to how one feels other people in their environment perceive them, whether that positively or negatively. Whether or not other cultures are subject to internal culture appraisal is based on that culture's type. According to Diener and Suh,

Collectivistic cultures are more likely to use norms and the social appraisals of others in evaluating their subjective well-being, whereas those [individualistic] societies are more likely to heavily weight the internal [frame of reference] arising from one's own happiness.

=== Different views on well-being ===
Various cultures have various perspectives on the nature of positive human functioning. For example, studies on aversion to happiness, or fear of happiness, indicates that some individuals and cultures are averse to the experience of happiness, because they believe happiness may cause bad things to happen. Empirical evidence indicates that there are fundamental differences in the ways well-being is construed in Western and non-Western cultures, including the Islamic and East Asian cultures. Exploring various cultural perspectives on well-being, Joshanloo (2014) identifies and discusses six broad differences between Western and non-Western conceptions of well-being. For example, whereas Western cultures tend to emphasize the absence of negative emotions and autonomy in defining well-being, Eastern cultures tend to emphasize virtuous or religious activity, self-transcendence, and harmony.

Eunkook M. Suh (University of California) and Shigehiro Oishi (University of Chicago) examined the differences of happiness on an international level and different cultures' views on what creates well-being and happiness. In a study, of over 6,000 students from 43 nations, to identify mean life satisfaction, on a scale of 1–7, the Chinese ranked lowest at 3.3; and Dutch scored the highest at 5.4. When asked how much subjective well-being was ideal, Chinese ranked lowest at 4.5, and Brazilians highest at 6.2, on a scale of 1–7. The study had three main findings: (1) People living in individualistic, rather than collectivist, societies are happier; (2) Psychological attributes referencing the individual are more relevant to Westerners; (3) Self-evaluating happiness levels depend on different cues, and experiences, from one's culture.

The results of a study by Chang E. C. showed that Asian Americans and Caucasian Americans have similar levels of optimism but Asian Americans are far more pessimistic than Caucasian Americans. However, there were no major differences in depression across cultures. On the other hand, pessimism was positively linked to problem solving behaviors for Asian Americans, but was negatively linked for Caucasian Americans.

=== Religion and spirituality ===
Religiousness and spirituality are closely related but distinct topics. Religion is any organized, and often institutionalized, system of cultural practices and beliefs pertaining to the meaning of human existence. It occurs within a traditional context such as a formal religious institution. Spirituality, on the other hand, is a general term applied to the process of finding meaning and a better understanding of one's place in the universe. It is the individual or collective search for that which is sacred or meaningful in life. One may therefore be religious but not spiritual, and vice versa.

==== Religion ====
There have been some studies of how religion relates to happiness. Causal relationships remain unclear, but more religion is seen in happier people. Consistent with PERMA, religion may provide a sense of meaning and connection to something bigger, beyond the self. Religion may also provide community membership and hence relationships. Another component may have to do with ritual.

Religion and happiness have been studied by a number of researchers, and religion features many elements addressing the components of happiness, as identified by positive psychology. Its association with happiness is facilitated in part by the social connections of organized religion, and by the neuropsychological benefits of prayer and belief.

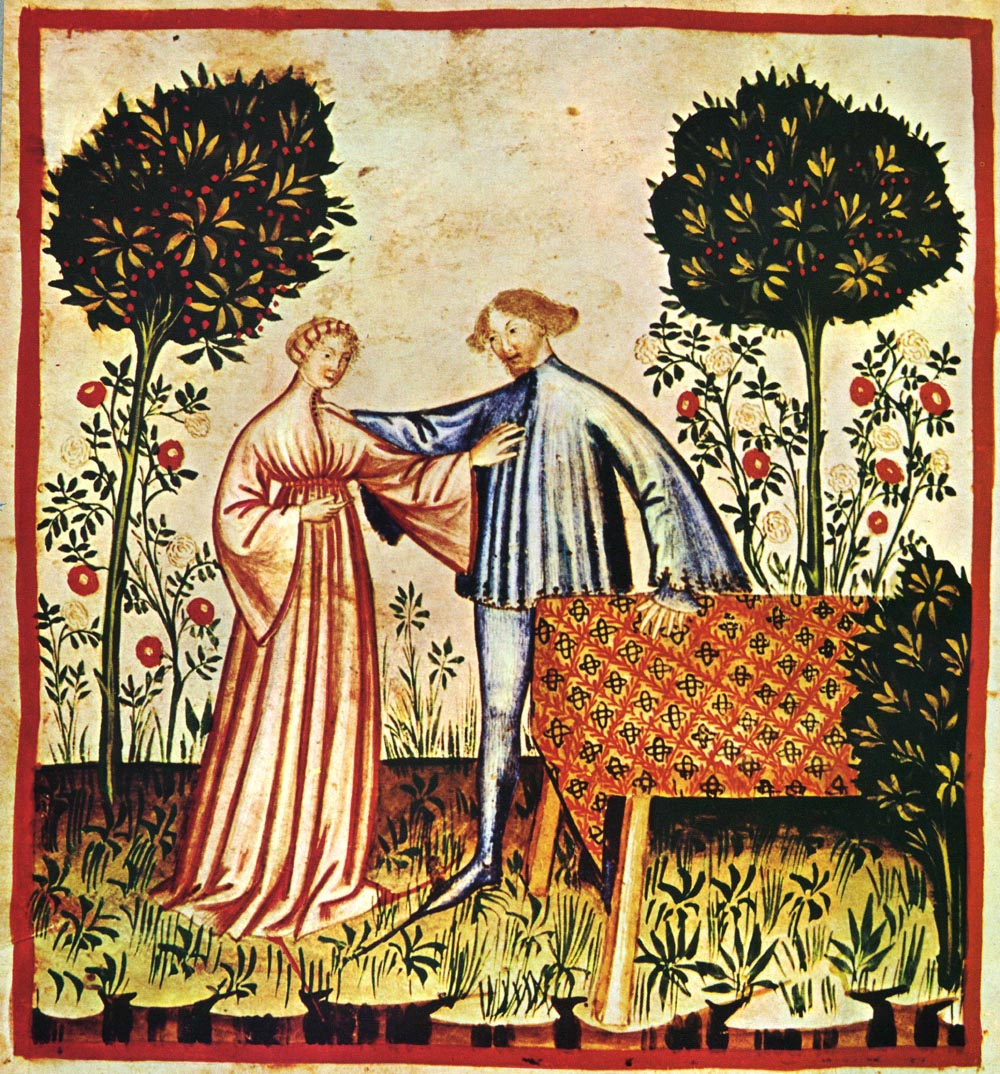
Joy, Tacuinum Sanitatis Casanatensis (14th century)

There are a number of mechanisms through which religion may make a person happier, including social contact and support that result from religious pursuits, the mental activity that comes with optimism and volunteering, learned coping strategies that enhance one's ability to deal with stress, and psychological factors such as "reason for being." It may also be that religious people engage in behaviors related to good health, such as less substance abuse, since the use of psychotropic substances is sometimes considered abuse.

The Handbook of Religion and Health describes a survey by Feigelman (1992) that examined happiness in Americans who have given up religion, in which it was found that there was little relationship between religious disaffiliation and unhappiness. A survey by Kosmin & Lachman (1993), also cited in this handbook, indicates that people with no religious affiliation appear to be at greater risk for depressive symptoms than those affiliated with a religion. A review of studies by 147 independent investigators found, "the correlation between religiousness and depressive symptoms was -.096, indicating that greater religiousness is mildly associated with fewer symptoms."

The Legatum Prosperity Index reflects the repeated finding of research on the science of happiness that there is a positive link between religious engagement and well-being: people who report that God is very important in their lives are on average more satisfied with their lives, after accounting for their income, age and other individual characteristics.

Surveys by Gallup, the National Opinion Research Centre and the Pew Organisation conclude that spiritually committed people are twice as likely to report being "very happy" than the least religiously committed people. An analysis of over 200 social studies contends that "high religiousness predicts a lower risk of depression and drug abuse and fewer suicide attempts, and more reports of satisfaction with sex life and a sense of well-being. However, the links between religion and happiness are always very broad in nature, highly reliant on scripture and small sample number. To that extent, there is a much larger connection between religion and suffering (Lincoln 1034)." And a review of 498 studies published in peer-reviewed journals concluded that a large majority of them showed a positive correlation between religious commitment and higher levels of perceived well-being and self-esteem and lower levels of hypertension, depression, and clinical delinquency. A meta-analysis of 34 recent studies published between 1990 and 2001 found that religiosity has a salutary relationship with psychological adjustment, being related to less psychological distress, more life satisfaction, and better self-actualization. Finally, a recent systematic review of 850 research papers on the topic concluded that "the majority of well-conducted studies found that higher levels of religious involvement are positively associated with indicators of psychological well-being (life satisfaction, happiness, positive affect, and higher morale) and with less depression, suicidal thoughts and behaviour, drug/alcohol use/abuse."

However, there remains strong disagreement among scholars about whether the effects of religious observance, particularly attending church or otherwise belonging to religious groups, is due to the spiritual or the social aspects—i.e. those who attend church or belong to similar religious organizations may well be receiving only the effects of the social connections involved. While these benefits are real enough, they may thus be the same one would gain by joining other, secular groups, clubs, or similar organizations.

Religiousness has often been found to correlate with positive health attributes. People who are more religious show better emotional well-being and lower rates of delinquency, alcoholism, drug abuse, and other social problems.

Six separate factors are cited as evidence for religion's effect on well-being: religion (1) provides social support, (2) supports healthy lifestyles, (3) promotes personality integration, (4) promotes generativity and altruism, (5) provides unique coping strategies, and (6) provides a sense of meaning and purpose. Many religious individuals experience emotions that create positive connections among people and allow them to express their values and potential. These four emotions are known as "sacred emotions," which are said to be (1) gratitude and appreciation, (2) forgiveness, (3) compassion and empathy, and (4) humility.

Social interaction is necessarily a part of the religious experience. Religiosity has been identified to correlate positively with prosocial behavior in trauma patients, and prosocial behavior is furthermore associated with well-being. It also has stronger associations with well-being in individuals genetically predisposed towards social sensitivity in environments where religion prioritizes social affiliation. It has also been linked to greater resilience against stress as well as higher measures of self-actualization and success in romantic relationships and parental responsibilities.

These benefits, while being correlational, may come about as a result of becoming more religiously involved. The benefit of having a secure social group likely plays a key part in religion's positive effects. One form of Christian counseling uses religion through talk therapy and assessments to promote mental health. In another instance, people who were not Buddhist, but were exposed to Buddhist concepts, scored higher on measures of outgroup acceptance and prosociality. This effect was found not only in Western countries, but also in places where Buddhism is prevalent, indicating a general association of Buddhism with acceptance. This finding seems to indicate that merely encountering a religious belief system such as Buddhism may allow some of its effects to be transferred to nonbelievers.

However, many disagree that the benefits the religious experience are due to their beliefs, and some find there to be no conclusive psychological benefits of belief at all. For example, the health benefit that the elderly gain from going to church may in fact be the reason they are able to go to church; the less healthy cannot leave their homes. Meta analysis has found that find studies purporting the beneficial results of religiosity often fail to fully represent data correctly due to a number of issues such as self-report bias, the use of inappropriate comparison groups, and the presence of criterion contamination. Other studies have disputed the efficacy of intercessory prayer positively affecting the health of those being prayed for. They have shown that, when scientifically rigorous studies are performed (by randomizing the patients and preventing them from knowing that they are being prayed for), there is no discernible effect.

Religion has power as a cohesive social force, and whether or not it is always beneficial is debated. Irrespective of a group's beliefs, many find that simply belonging to a tight social group reduces anxiety and mental health problems. In addition, there may be a degree of self-selectivity amongst the religious; the behavioral benefits they display may simply be common aspects of those who choose to or are able to practice religion. As a result, whether or not religion can be prescribed scientifically as a means of self-betterment is unclear.

==== Spirituality ====
While religion is often formalised and community-oriented, spirituality tends to be individually based and not as formalised. In a 2014 study, 320 children, ages 8–12, in both public and private schools, were given a Spiritual Well-Being Questionnaire assessing the correlation between spirituality and happiness. Spirituality – and not religious practices (praying, attending church services) – correlated positively with the child's happiness; the more spiritual the child was, the happier the child was. Spirituality accounted for about 3–26% of the variance in happiness.

Meditation has been found to lead to high activity in the brain's left prefrontal cortex, which in turn has been found to correlate with happiness.

A study using the Oxford happiness questionnaire on Brahma Kumaris Raja yoga meditators showed them having higher happiness than the control group. Yongey Mingyur Rinpoche has said that neuro scientists have found that with meditation, an individual's happiness baseline can change.

Many people describe themselves as both religious and spiritual, but spirituality represents just one particular function of religion. Spirituality as related to positive psychology can be defined as "a search for the sacred". What is defined as sacred can be related to God, life itself, or almost any other facet of existence. It is viewed as having spiritual implications which are transcendent of the individual. Spiritual well-being addresses this human need for transcendence and involves social as well as existential well-being. Spiritual well-being is associated with various positive outcomes such as better physical and psychological well-being, lower anxiety, less depression, self-actualization, positive relationships with parents, higher rates of positive personality traits and acceptance. Researchers have cautioned to differentiate between correlative and causal associations between spirituality and psychology.

Reaching the sacred as a personal goal, also called spiritual striving, has been found to correlate highest with well-being compared to other forms of striving. This type of striving can improve a sense of self and relationships and creates a connection to the transcendent Additionally, multiple studies have shown that self-reported spirituality is related to lower rates of mortality and depression and higher rates of happiness.

Currently, most research on spirituality examines ways in which spirituality can help in times of crisis. Spirituality has been found to remain constant when experiencing traumatic events and/or life stressors such as accidents, war, sickness, and death of a loved one. When confronted with an obstacle, people might turn to prayer or meditation. Coping mechanisms involving spirituality include meditative meditation, creating boundaries to preserve the sacred, spiritual purification to return to the righteous path, and spiritual reframing which focuses on maintaining belief. One clinical application of spirituality and positive psychology research is the "psychospiritual intervention," which represents the potential that spirituality has to increase well-being. These coping mechanisms that aim to preserve the sacred have been found by researchers to increase well-being and return the individual back to the sacred.

Overall, spirituality is a process that occurs over a lifetime and includes searching, conserving, and redefining what is sacred in an extremely individualized manner. It does not always have a positive effect and in fact, has been associated with very negative events and life changes. Research is lacking in spirituality but it is necessary because spirituality can assist in enhancing the experiences of the uncontrollable parts of life.

== Other factors ==
=== Modernity ===
Much research has pointed at the rising rates of depression, leading people to speculate that modernization may be a factor in the growing percentage of depressed people. One study found that women in urban America were much more likely to experience depression than those in rural Nigeria. Other studies have found a positive correlation between a country's GDP per capita, as quantitative measure of modernization, and lifetime risk of a mood disorder trended toward significance (p=0.06).

Many people believe it is the increased number of pressures and expectations, increased isolation, increased individualism, and increased inactivity that contribute to higher rates of depression in modern societies.

=== Weather ===
Some evidence suggests sunnier climates do not predict happiness. In one study, both Californians and Midwesterners expected the former's happiness ratings to be higher due to a sunnier environment. In fact, the Californian and Midwestern happiness ratings did not show a significant difference. Other research has found that temperature, wind power, sunlight, precipitation and air temperature has a small impact on mood, but some people appear to be affected in a large way (but it's not 5 factor personality). A study of Dutch teenagers identified that the effect of weather on mood depends on whether they were Summer lovers, summer haters, rain haters and unaffected by weather. Other researchers say the necessary minimum daily dose of sunlight is as little as 30 minutes.

That is not to say weather is never a factor for happiness. Perhaps the changing norms of sunlight cause seasonal affective disorder, which undermines level of happiness.

== Additional future research ==
Positive psychology research and practice is currently conducted and developed in various countries throughout the world. To illustrate, in Canada, Charles Hackney of Briercrest College applies positive psychology to the topic of personal growth through martial arts training; Paul Wong, president of the International Network on Personal Meaning, is developing an existential approach to positive psychology, which is framed in the second wave positive psychology (PP 2.0).

The research program 'Understanding Positive Emotions' at Human Science Lab, London, investigates how material well-being and perceptual well-being work as relative determinants in conditioning our mind for positive emotions.

Cognitive and behavioral change, although sometimes slight and complex, can produce an 'intense affect'.

Isen (2009) remarked that further progress requires suitable research methods, and appropriate theories on which to base contemporary research. Chang (2008) suggested that researchers have a number of paths to pursue regarding the enhancement of emotional intelligence, even though emotional intelligence does not guarantee the development of positive affect; in short, more study is required to track the gradient of positive affect in psychology.

== See also ==
- Better Life Index
- Broad measures of economic progress
- Gross National Happiness
- Gross National Well-being
- Happiness economics
- Human Development Index
- Humanistic economics
- Job satisfaction
- Social determinants of health
- Social determinants of health in poverty
- Social determinants of mental health
- World Values Survey

== Sources ==
- Seligman ME, Csikszentmihalyi M (January 2000). "Positive psychology. An introduction". The American Psychologist. 55 (1): 5–14. doi:10.1037/0003-066x.55.1.5. hdl:10983/26120. PMID 11392865. S2CID 14783574.
