= Timothy Wilson =

American social psychologist and writer

- Education: Hampshire College (BA); University of Michigan (MA, PhD)
- Scientific career
- Fields: Social psychology
- Workplaces: University of Virginia
- Thesis: Awareness and self-perception (1977)
- Doctoral advisor: Richard Nisbett

Timothy DeCamp Wilson is an American social psychologist and writer.

He is the Sherrell J. Aston Professor of Psychology at the University of Virginia and teaches public policy at the Frank Batten School of Leadership and Public Policy. He is known for his research on self-knowledge and the influence of the unconscious mind on decision-making, preferences and behavior. He is the author of two popular books on psychology, Strangers to Ourselves: Discovering the Adaptive Unconscious and Redirect: The Surprising New Science of Psychological Change.

== Education ==
Wilson received a Bachelor of Arts with a major in psychology from Hampshire College in 1973. He received a Master of Arts in 1975 and a Doctor of Philosophy in 1977, both in psychology from the University of Michigan.

== Career ==
Wilson is best known for his research on the adaptive unconscious, self-knowledge, and affective forecasting. With Richard Nisbett, Wilson authored one of psychology's most cited papers, "Telling more than we can know – verbal reports on mental processes," that demonstrated the difficulty humans have in introspecting on their own mental processes (Psychological Review, 1977, cited 2731 times as of May 22, 2007, according to ISI Web of Knowledge). His longtime collaborator is Daniel Gilbert of Harvard University.

Wilson has published two popular press books, Strangers to Ourselves and Redirect, and co-authored Social Psychology, an introductory textbook on social psychology. The textbook has been translated into Italian, Polish, Chinese, German, Russian, and Serbian; Strangers to Ourselves has been translated into Dutch and Japanese, with Chinese and German editions forthcoming.

Wilson received a Bachelor of Arts in psychology from Hampshire College in 1973 and a PhD in social psychology from the University of Michigan's Department of Psychology in 1977. From 1977 to 1979, he was a faculty member at Duke University. Since 1979, he has been a faculty member at the University of Virginia. His research has been supported by the National Institute of Mental Health, the National Science Foundation, and the Russell Sage Foundation. In 2009, he was named as a fellow to the American Academy of Arts and Sciences.

His work has received numerous awards, including an All-University Outstanding Teaching Award from the University of Virginia in 2001, as well as the Thomas Jefferson Award for Excellence in Scholarship in 2015. In 2013, he was the recipient of the Society for Personality and Social Psychology's Donald T. Campbell Award, and in 2015 he was named a William James Fellow by the Association for Psychological Science.

He lives in Charlottesville, Virginia, with his wife, Deirdre Smith. He has two children, Christopher and Leigh.

== Bibliography ==
- Wilson, Timothy (2002). Strangers to Ourselves: Discovering the Adaptive Unconscious. Cambridge: Belknap Press. ISBN 978-0-674-00936-3.
- Wilson, Timothy (2011). Redirect: The Surprising New Science of Psychological Change. Little, Brown and Company. ISBN 978-0-316-05188-0.

== Textbooks ==
Timothy D. Wilson also contributed as an author in co-writing Social Psychology (9th Edition)

== Articles in journals ==
- Wilson, Timothy D.; Reinhard, David A.; Westgate, Erin C.; Gilbert, Daniel T.; Ellerbeck, Nicole; Hahn, Cheryl; Brown, Casey L.; Shaked, Adi (July 4, 2014). "Just think: The challenges of the disengaged mind". Science. 345 (6192): 75–77. Bibcode:2014Sci...345...75W. doi:10.1126/science.1250830. PMC 4330241. PMID 24994650.
- Wilson, Timothy D.; Gilbert, Daniel T. (2003). Affective Forecasting. Vol. 35. pp. 345–411. doi:10.1016/S0065-2601(03)01006-2. ISBN 9780120152353.

== See also ==
- Cognitive bias
- Introspection illusion
- Region-beta paradox
