= Daniel Gilbert (psychologist) =

American social psychologist and writer

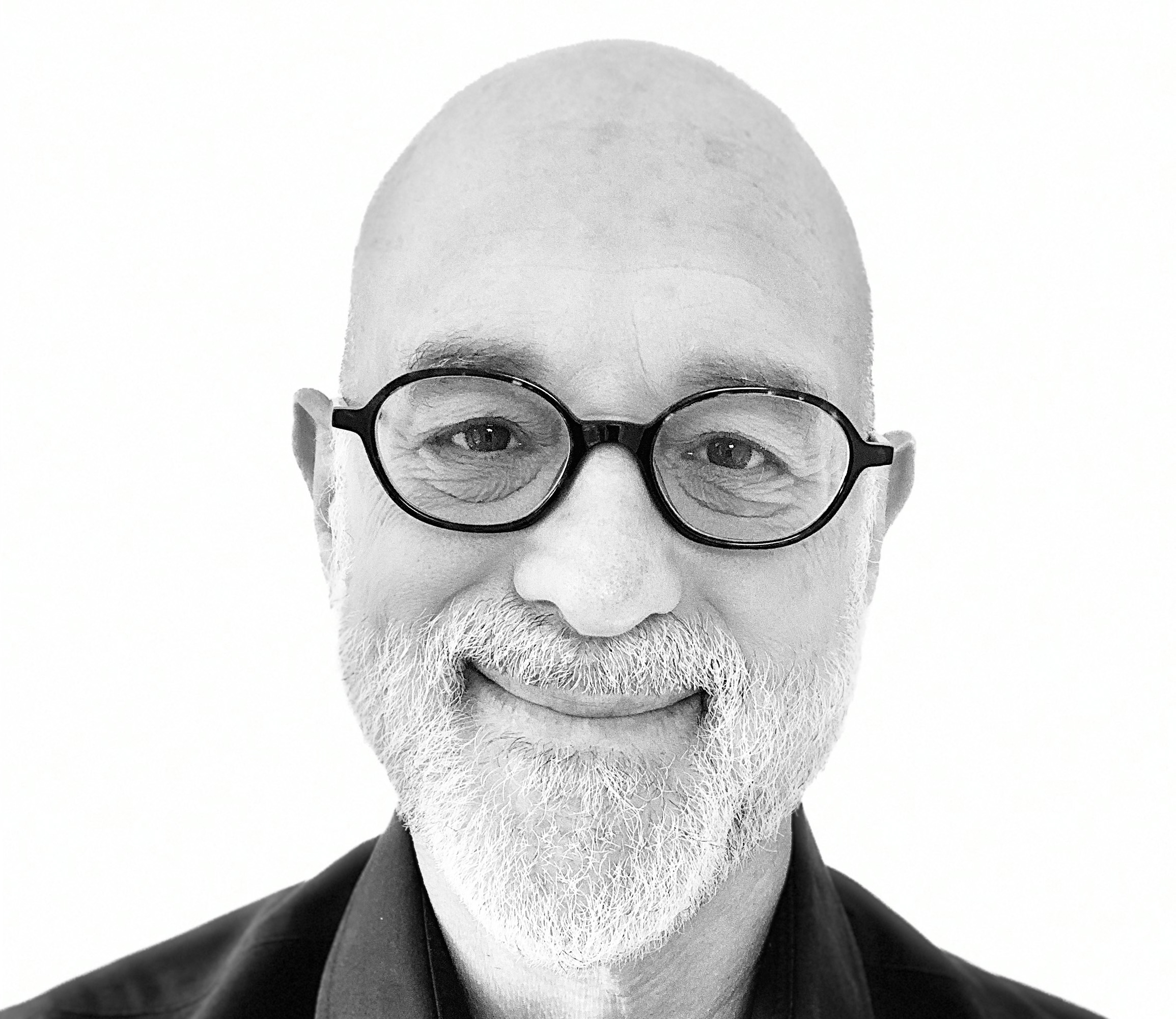
- Gilbert in 2020
- Born: Daniel Todd Gilbert; November 5, 1957 (age 68); Ithaca, New York
- Education: University of Colorado Denver (BA); Princeton University (PhD)
- Occupations: Edgar Pierce Professor of Psychology, Harvard University
- Spouse: Marilynn Oliphant
- Writing career
- Genre: Social psychology
- Notable work: Stumbling on Happiness (2006)
- Notable awards: Early Career Award (American Psychological Association); William James Award (Association for Psychological Science)
- Website: wjh-www.harvard.edu/~dtg/

Daniel Todd Gilbert (born November 5, 1957) is an American social psychologist and writer. He is the Edgar Pierce Professor of Psychology at Harvard University and is known for his research with Timothy Wilson of the University of Virginia on affective forecasting. He is the author of the international bestseller Stumbling on Happiness, which has been translated into more than 30 languages and won the 2007 Royal Society Prize for Science Books. He has also written essays for several newspapers and magazines, hosted a non-fiction television series on PBS, and given three popular TED talks.

== Life and career ==
Gilbert dropped out of high school at age 15, and spent a year hitchhiking across the United States. He later earned his GED and received a Bachelor of Arts in psychology from the University of Colorado Denver in 1981 and a Ph.D. in social psychology from Princeton University in 1985. From 1985 to 1996, he was a faculty member at the University of Texas at Austin. Since 1996, he has worked at Harvard University where he is currently the Edgar Pierce Professor of Psychology.

He and his wife, Marilynn Oliphant, live in Cambridge, Massachusetts. Gilbert has one son and four grandchildren.

== Works ==
Gilbert's 2006 book, Stumbling on Happiness was a New York Times bestseller and has been translated into more than 40 languages. It won the 2007 Royal Society Prizes for Science Books and was included as one of fifty key books in psychology in 50 Psychology Classics (2006) by Tom Butler-Bowdon.

Gilbert's non-fiction essays have appeared in The New York Times, Los Angeles Times, Forbes, Time, and others, and his short stories have appeared in Amazing Stories and Isaac Asimov's Science Fiction Magazine, as well as other magazines and anthologies. He has been a guest on numerous television shows including 20/20, The Today Show, Charlie Rose, and The Colbert Report. He is the co-writer and host of the 6-hour Nova television series "This Emotional Life" which aired on PBS in January, 2010, and won several Telly Awards.

He has given three popular TED talks, including one of the 25 most-viewed talks of all time (as of November 2022).

Beginning in 2013, Gilbert appeared in a series of Prudential Financial television commercials that used data visualization to get Americans to think about the importance of saving for their retirements. For example, in one advertisement, people were asked to put stickers on a time-line to indicate the age of the oldest person they knew to illustrate the recent increase in life expectancy. In another, Gilbert started a chain-reaction and set a Guinness World Record by toppling a 30-foot (9 m) domino to illustrate the power of compound interest. In a third, people put magnets on walls marked "Past" and "Future" to illustrate the optimism bias.

=== Books ===
- Gilbert, Daniel (2006). Stumbling on Happiness. New York, NY: Knopf. ISBN 1-400-04266-6.
- Fiske, Susan T.; Gilbert, Daniel T.; Lindzey, Gardner (2010). Handbook of Social Psychology (5th ed.). Hoboken, N.J: Wiley. ISBN 9780470137482.

=== Scholarly articles ===
Gilbert has also collaborated with other scientists (most notably, his long-time collaborator Timothy Wilson) on articles published in top scientific journals such as Science, Nature, and Psychological Science.

== Awards and honors ==
Gilbert has won numerous awards for his teaching, including the Harvard College Professorship and the Phi Beta Kappa Teaching Prize. He has also won awards for his research, including the American Psychological Association's Distinguished Scientific Award for an Early Career Contribution to Psychology. In 2008 he was elected to the American Academy of Arts and Sciences. Gilbert was awarded an honorary Doctor of Letters degree from Bates College, in Lewiston, Maine on May 29, 2016. and an honorary Doctor of Social Science degree from Yale University in 2021. In 2019, he received the William James Fellow Award from the Association for Psychological Science for his contributions to social psychology. In 2024, he was elected to the American Philosophical Society.

== See also ==
- Affective forecasting
- Region-beta paradox
