= Region-beta paradox =

Psychological phenomenon

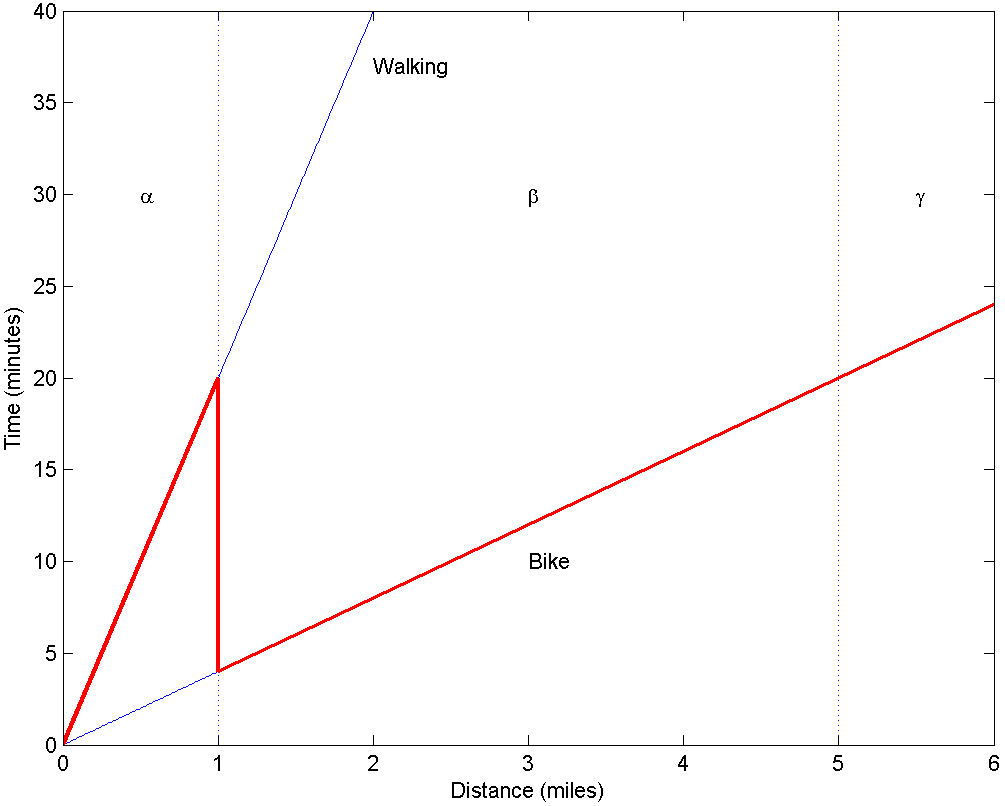
The region-beta paradox: a person prefers to walk (at 3 miles per hour) if distances are less than a mile, and to cycle (15 miles per hour) for longer distances. Despite the remoteness of points in region beta, they will be reached faster than most points in the nearby region alpha.

The region-beta paradox is the phenomenon that people can sometimes recover more quickly from more distressing experiences than from less distressing ones. The hypothesized reason is that intense states trigger psychological defense processes that reduce the distress, while less intense states do not trigger the same psychological defense processes and, therefore, less effective attenuation of the stress occurs. However, people typically predict intense states to last longer.

The paradox has been observed in the psychological effects of exposure to terrorist attacks. This is likely related to activation of coping, cognitive dissonance and other forms of mental mobilization.

It has been computationally modelled in an affective computing model.

== Examples ==
- If someone is currently in a non-ideal romantic relationship, they will be less likely to end it to find an ideal relationship than if their current relationship was further non-ideal, thus making their current overall situation worse.
- The same would be true if they were in a not-preferred job which is still acceptable, where the perceived strain in finding a new job makes them stuck in region alpha.
- Another useful example is if one prefers living in a tidy home, a small mess might not be enough to start cleaning up. A slightly bigger mess would cause enough discomfort to start cleaning up, thus reaching the end goal of a tidy house faster.

== Origin of name ==
The name originates from the illustration in the paper by Daniel Gilbert et al. that introduced the paradox. They consider a commuter who has the habit of walking to destinations within a mile of their origin, and biking to more distant destinations. Since the bike is faster the commuter will reach some distant locations more quickly than nearer destinations (region beta in their diagram), reversing the normal tendency to arrive later at more distant locations.

This non-monotonicity applies to states where interventions can be chosen, but are not chosen below certain thresholds (because of cost etc.). For example, injured people may be more likely to seek out effective means to speed their recovery (taking medicine, going to a doctor, undergoing surgery) when the injury is more severe than for mild injuries, making the lesser injuries last longer.

A trick knee hurts longer than a shattered patella because the latter injury exceeds the critical threshold for pain and thereby triggers the very processes that attenuate it.

— Gilbert et al. 2004

== See also ==
- Affective forecasting
- Sunk cost fallacy
- List of paradoxes: psychology
- Boiling frog
