= Stumbling on Happiness =

2006 book by Daniel Gilbert

- Softcover edition
- Author: Daniel Gilbert
- Language: English
- Subject: Psychology
- Genre: Nonfiction
- Publisher: Knopf
- Publication date: 2006
- Publication place: United States
- Media type: Print, e-book, audiobook
- ISBN: 1-4000-4266-6
- OCLC: 61362165
- Dewey Decimal: 158 22
- LC Class: BF575.H27 G55 2006

Stumbling on Happiness is a nonfiction book by Daniel Gilbert, published in the United States and Canada in 2006 by Knopf. It has been translated into more than thirty languages and is a New York Times bestseller.

== Theme ==
Gilbert's central thesis is that, through perception and cognitive biases, people imagine the future poorly, in particular what will make them happy. He argues that imagination fails in three ways:

1. Imagination tends to add and remove details, but people do not realize that key details may be fabricated or missing from the imagined scenario.
2. Imagined futures (and pasts) are more like the present than they actually will be (or were).
3. Imagination fails to realize that things will feel different once they actually happen—most notably, the psychological immune system will make bad things feel not so bad as they are imagined to feel.

Also, Gilbert covers the topic of 'filling in' or the frequent use of patterns, by the mind, to connect events which we do actually recall with other events we expect or anticipate fit into the expected experience. This 'filling in' is also used by our eyes and optic nerves to remove our blind spot or scotoma, and instead substitute what our mind expects to be present in the blind spot.

The book is written for the layperson, generally avoiding abstruse terminology and explaining common quirks of reasoning through simple experiments that exploited them.

== Summary ==
Stumbling on Happiness has six sections labeled Prospection, Subjectivity, Realism, Presentism, Rationalization, and Corrigibility. A summary of each follows.

In the Prospection section Gilbert contends that humans are most special because of their ability to imagine. Our large frontal lobes biologically distinguish us from other animals and the function of the frontal lobe is to help us imagine. However, our imagination often leads us astray, and the purpose of the book is to help the reader appreciate the shortcomings of imagination.

The Subjectivity section addresses the meaning of happiness and emphasizes that happiness is a subjective feeling. Gilbert says, “Evaluating people’s claims about their own happiness is an exceptionally thorny business.” No perfectly reliable tool exists to measure a person’s happiness. Instead researchers must rely primarily on the “honest, real-time report of the attentive individual”. Finally, given the imperfections in self-reported feelings of happiness, scientists must rely on the law of large numbers, namely, to ask many people the same question and compare their answers.

The Realism section explains that imagination suffers from shortcomings. The first shortcoming is a lack of accuracy or realism. Imagination relies on memory and perception, and both memory and perception are prone to omit important details and to add false details.

In the Presentism section, Gilbert addresses the second major shortcoming of imagination which is that it is biased toward the present. People project their current circumstance and values onto the future, but the future is often different enough from the present as to make such projections misleading. One phenomenon related to this problem is that wonderful experiences are most treasured on their first occurrence but typically less so on subsequent occurrences.

The third and final shortcoming is presented in the Rationalization section. People have a psychological immune system. They are prone to believe what benefits them and to disbelieve what does not benefit them. Gilbert says, “A healthy psychological immune system strikes a balance that allows us to feel good enough to cope with our situation but bad enough to do something about it”.

The Corrigibility section shows that illusions of foresight are best addressed when a person trying to anticipate a future experience turns to arbitrary, other people for insight about their related experience. Cultural values tend to be perpetuated as memes and sometimes falsify claims about what would make an individual happy.

== Reception ==
Reviews of the book include:

- The Guardian: "Gilbert's book is a witty, racy and readable study of expectation, anticipation, memory and perception: all bits of scaffolding within the structure of happiness."
- The Publishers Weekly: "a scientific explanation of the limitations of the human imagination and how it steers us wrong in our search for happiness, … commonplace examples render a potentially academic topic accessible and educational, even if his approach is at times overly prescriptive."
- Greater Good Magazine: "Although we imagine ourselves to be so unique as to be unable to use random people’s experience as a guide to personal fulfillment, Gilbert shows how this is actually a much better predictor of happiness than our own wishful thinking."

In 2007, the book was awarded the Royal Society Prizes for Science Books general prize for the best science writing for a non-specialist audience.

== See also ==
- Positive psychology
