= Well-being =

Measure of how well someone's life is going

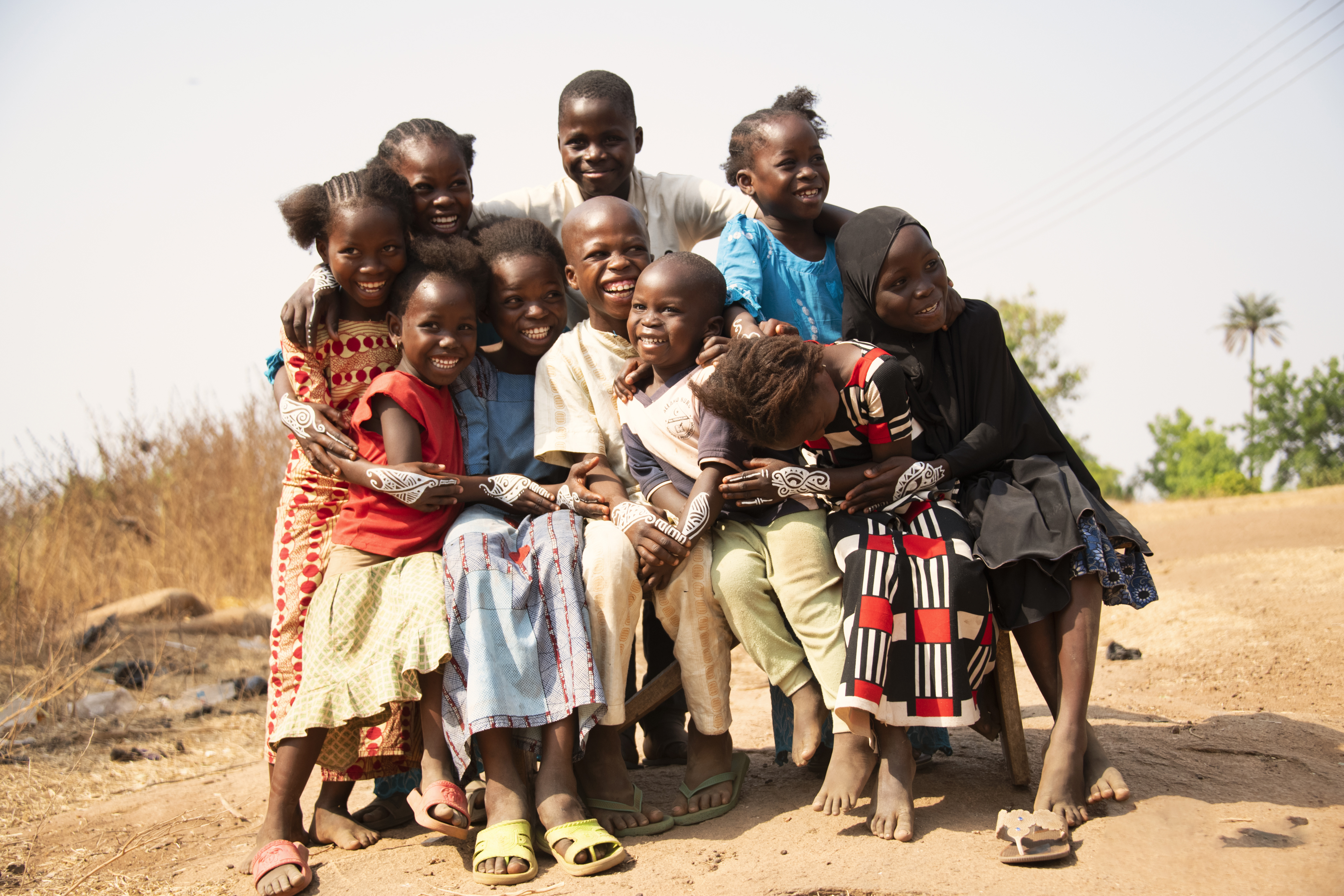
Positive interpersonal relationships contribute to well-being.

Well-being (Note: Also spelled wellbeing) is what is intrinsically good for a person. Also called welfare and quality of life, it is a measure of how well life is going for someone. In the broadest sense, it covers the balance of all positive and negative aspects of a person's life. More narrowly, it refers only to positive degrees and contrasts with ill-being, which denotes negative ones. In this sense, well-being is what egoists typically seek for themselves and altruists aim to enhance in others, serving as a central goal of many individual and societal endeavors.

Researchers discuss different types of well-being by how they are measured, who they belong to, and which domain of life they affect. Subjective well-being refers to how a person feels about and evaluates their life. Objective well-being encompasses factors that can be assessed from an external perspective, such as health, income, and security. Individual well-being concerns the quality of life of a particular person, whereas community well-being measures how well a group of people functions and thrives. Forms of well-being belonging to specific domains of life include physical, psychological, emotional, social, and economic well-being.

Theories of well-being aim to identify its essential features. Hedonism argues that well-being ultimately depends on the balance of pleasure over pain. Desire theories hold that the satisfaction of desires is the source of well-being. Objective list theories assert that a combination of diverse elements is responsible for well-being. Often-discussed contributing factors include feelings, emotions, life satisfaction, achievement, finding a sense of meaning, interpersonal relationships, and health.

Well-being is relevant to many fields of inquiry. Positive psychology studies the factors and conditions of optimal human functioning. Philosophy examines the nature and theoretical foundations of well-being and its role as a goal of human conduct. Other related disciplines include economics, sociology, anthropology, medicine, education, politics, and religion. Although the philosophical study of well-being dates back millennia, research in the empirical sciences has intensified only since the second half of the 20th century.

== Definition ==
Well-being is what is intrinsically or non-instrumentally good for a person or in their self-interest. It is a measure of how well a person's life is going for them. (Note: For example, Guy Fletcher characterizes well-being as "how well lives go for the person who lives them".) In the broadest sense, the term covers the whole spectrum of quality of life: the balance of all positive and negative aspects of a person's life. More narrowly, well-being refers only to positive degrees and contrasts with ill-being, which denotes negative ones. Its precise definition is disputed and varies across disciplines and cultures. Some characterizations focus on a single element, such as happiness, while others include multiple components, such as good physical and mental health, positive emotions, an engaged and flourishing lifestyle, inner harmony, and positive interpersonal relationships. Some definitions additionally include material conditions, such as income, safety, and environmental quality. Outside the academic context, the term well-being is used more loosely in diverse social and cultural settings, typically as a synonym of health and happiness. Although discussions of well-being usually focus on humans, the term can also refer to the quality of life of non-human animals.

As a person-specific (Note: In a slightly different sense, the term is also used to talk about the state of a group of people.) value, well-being contrasts with impersonal value, or value simpliciter. A thing has impersonal value if it is good for the world at large by making it a better place, without being restricted to one specific person. Well-being, by contrast, is what is good for or relative to someone. While personal and impersonal values often align, they can diverge, for example, if an individual seeks personal gain that is bad from a wider perspective. The exact relation between these two types of value is disputed. According to one proposal, impersonal value is the sum of all personal values.

Well-being is typically understood as an intrinsic or final value, meaning that it is good in itself, independent of external factors. Things with instrumental value, by contrast, are only good as means leading to other good things, like the value of money. Well-being is further distinguished from moral, religious, and aesthetic values, which describe what is ethically right, sacred, or beautiful. Well-being may or may not overlap with other values. For instance, donating money to a charity may be morally good, even if it does not increase the donor's well-being.

The terms quality of life, good life, welfare, prudential value, personal good, and individual utility are often used as synonyms for well-being. Similarly, the words pleasure, life satisfaction, and happiness are employed in overlapping ways with well-being. However, their precise meanings differ in technical contexts like philosophy and psychology: pleasure refers to individual feelings about what is attractive; life satisfaction is a positive attitude a person has towards their life as a whole; happiness is sometimes identified with life satisfaction or understood as a positive balance of pleasure over pain. (Note: Pleasure, life satisfaction, and happiness are central to the subjective side of well-being, and some theories assert that they are the only components of well-being.)

Well-being is a crucial goal of many human endeavors on both individual and societal levels. It is the object of various attitudes and emotions, such as concern for others as well as feelings of pity, envy, and ill will. Well-being is the state that egoists seek for themselves, and altruists aim to increase for others. Many disciplines examine or are guided by considerations of well-being, including ethics, psychology, sociology, economics, education, public policy, law, and medicine. The word well-being comes from the Italian term benessere. It entered the English language in the 16th century.

== Types ==
Since the definition of well-being spans several dimensions, researchers have proposed various frameworks to capture its different forms. Types of well-being can be categorized by how they are measured, to whom they apply, and which domain of life they affect. Some researchers limit their inquiry to one specific type, while others investigate the interrelations among them.

=== Subjective and objective well-being ===
Subjective well-being is the measure of how people feel about and evaluate their lives, encompassing both affective and cognitive components. A person has high affective well-being if they have many pleasant experiences and few unpleasant ones. High cognitive well-being occurs when a person evaluates their life positively, making a global assessment that things are going well.

Subjective well-being is measured using questionnaires in which individuals report the quality of their experiences. Single-item measures provide the simplest approach, focusing on a single scale, such as asking participants to rate how content they are with their lives on a scale from 1 to 10. Multi-item scales include questions for distinct aspects of subjective well-being, with the advantage of reducing the influence of the wording of any single question. They have separate questions for domains such as the presence of positive affect, the absence of negative affect, and overall life satisfaction, which they combine into a comprehensive index.

Objective well-being encompasses objective factors indicating that a person's life is going well. Unlike subjective well-being, these factors can be assessed and quantified from an external perspective. They include personal, social, economic, and environmental aspects such as health, level of education, income, housing, amount of leisure, and security.

By relying on objective data, measures of objective well-being are less affected by cultural and personal biases that can influence self-reports. However, it is not universally accepted that objective well-being is a form of well-being in the strictest sense. This doubt is based on the idea that well-being is essentially a subjective phenomenon tied to a person's experience. According to this view, objective factors influence and indicate well-being but are not themselves forms of well-being.

Some studies focus on either subjective or objective well-being. Others combine both perspectives to provide a more comprehensive picture and counterbalance their shortcomings. Although subjective and objective well-being often align, this is not necessarily the case. For example, a person scoring low on objective measures, such as low income and frail health, may nonetheless be subjectively happy.

=== Individual and community well-being ===
The distinction between individual and community well-being is central to understanding how societies flourish at different levels and for evaluating trade-offs in policy decisions. Individual well-being concerns the quality of life of a particular person and is the main focus of disciplines such as psychology and some schools of philosophy. Community well-being applies the concept of well-being to a group of people. It encompasses a broad range of economic, social, environmental, and cultural aspects that influence how the community functions and thrives while ensuring that the community's needs are fulfilled.

One view sees community well-being as the sum of the degrees of the well-being of each individual, while others emphasize that the relation between the two is more complex. Individual and community well-being often support each other. For instance, high individual well-being can lead a person to contribute more to their community, and a well-functioning community can make its members happy. However, there can also be tensions, like when changes necessary for community well-being conflict with the individual well-being of certain members.

Closely related to community well-being are categories defined for specific demographic groups. For instance, child well-being is about the quality of life of children, including factors such as health, education, material security, and social development in a loving and nurturing environment. Other examples include women's, elderly, student, and employee well-being.

=== Other types ===
Various types are distinguished by the domain of life to which they belong. Physical well-being concerns the domain of the body, including the capacity to engage in physical activity and the absence of illness and bodily pain. It includes general health considerations and the ability to perform one's social role without being hindered by physical limitations.

Psychological well-being, also called mental health, is a state of mind characterized by internal balance. (Note: In a slightly different sense, the term is also used as a synonym for subjective well-being.) It involves the absence or successful management of disorders and disturbances, together with the abilities to cope with challenging situations, maintain positive relationships, and cultivate personal growth. It is closely linked to intellectual, spiritual, and emotional well-being. Intellectual well-being encompasses well-functioning cognitive abilities and traits, such as critical thinking, problem-solving, and curiosity. Spiritual well-being is a state in which people find purpose in life and have inner peace, self-confidence, and a sense of identity. Emotional well-being involves the capacities to comprehend, articulate, and regulate emotions, together with an overall positive mood. (Note: There are various alternative definitions of emotional well-being and it is sometimes used as an umbrella term including many other types of well-being.)

Hedonic well-being refers to a life rich in pleasurable experiences and devoid of suffering. Eudaimonic well-being is a form of personal fulfillment in which an individual flourishes by striving for excellence and actualizing their innate potential.

Social well-being concerns the quality and number of interpersonal connections, including how well a person functions in their social environment and the level of social support available to them. Economic well-being refers to the economic situation of a person, such as their current employment situation, job opportunities, financial stability, and other relevant resources and skills. Further types of well-being include financial, cultural, political, and environmental well-being.

== Theories of well-being ==
Theories of well-being aim to identify the essential features or components that different forms of well-being have in common. They focus on the intrinsic nature of well-being, rather than external causes or conventional indicators used to measure it. For example, money and medicine can contribute to well-being as external causes but are not themselves forms of well-being. A traditionally influential approach categorizes theories of well-being into hedonism, desire theories, and objective list theories. This classification does not cover all theories, and the different categories are not always mutually exclusive. In some cases, distinct theories recommend different lifestyles, while in others, they advocate for the same lifestyle but provide different reasons why it is good.

=== Hedonism ===
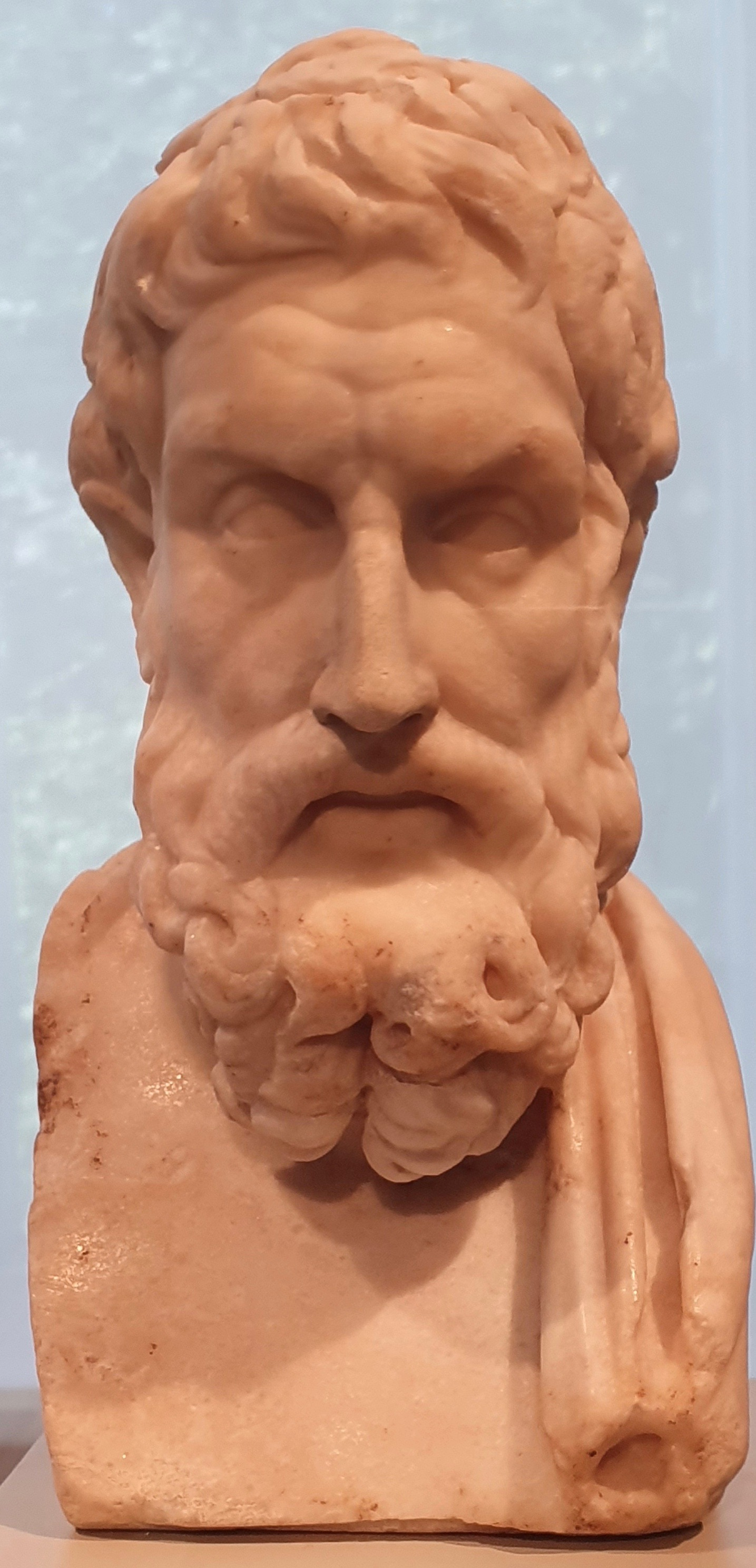
Epicurus (341–270 BCE) proposed a moderate hedonism, recommending the cultivation of well-being in the form of a tranquil state of mind through moderation.

Hedonism about well-being, also called prudential hedonism, holds that pleasure and pain are the only factors of well-being. (Note: As a technical term, hedonism describes a controversial but respectable philosophical position. It contrasts with the more negative meaning of the term found in everyday language, denoting an egoistic lifestyle seeking short-term gratification.) It states that how well a person's life goes depends entirely on how it feels to live it, expressed as the balance of pleasure over pain. According to this view, a person who experiences frequent joy and contentment has high well-being, whereas someone who is constantly in pain and suffering has low well-being. One view sees pleasure and pain as bodily sensations, like the pleasure of eating delicious food and the pain of injuring a leg. However, hedonists generally take a wider perspective, characterizing pleasure and pain broadly as any experience that feels good or bad. This broader understanding includes the intellectual pleasure of reading an engaging book and the sorrow of losing a loved one. According to quantitative hedonism, the value of each episode of pleasure and pain depends only on its intensity and duration. (Note: To quantify the amount of pleasure contained in an experience, the term hedon is sometimes used.) Qualitative hedonism, an alternative perspective, additionally considers non-quantitative factors, arguing that some pleasures are intrinsically superior to others because of their qualitative character, even if they have the same intensity and duration.

One criticism of hedonism acknowledges that some pleasures have value but rejects that this is the case for all of them. According to this view, certain pleasures have no value and may even be bad for a person, such as sadistic pleasures from torturing animals. Another objection questions whether pleasure is the only thing of value for individuals, citing things like virtue, achievement, friendship, and the satisfaction of desires as distinct sources. An influential counterexample to hedonism, proposed by philosopher Robert Nozick (1938–2002), imagines an experience machine that simulates a life filled with pleasures, which would be ideal from the perspective of hedonism. Pointing out that life in this virtual simulation lacks authenticity, Nozick argues that mere pleasure, by itself, is not the only source of value.

=== Desire theories ===
According to desire theories, the satisfaction of desires is the only source of well-being. This means that individuals have well-being when they get what they want. Desires are subjective attitudes directed at things or states, such as the desire to eat potato chips or become famous. Desires present conditions that are either fulfilled or frustrated depending on whether the desired state of affairs is actualized. (Note: Some versions of desire theories are only interested in whether a desire is objectively fulfilled or not, independent of whether the person subjectively knows about it. According to others, fulfilled desires are only valuable if the person believes that they are fulfilled.) Desire theories have some overlap with hedonism because people desire pleasure and the satisfaction of desires is typically pleasurable. However, desire theorists argue that people may desire other goods besides pleasures, emphasizing the diversity of desires and the individual differences from one person to another. For instance, some people prioritize family and health, while others primarily seek career success, wealth, knowledge, or spiritual enlightenment. As a result, the concrete path to well-being can vary greatly from person to person based on their subjective preferences.

Critics of desire theories point out that people sometimes desire things that are bad for them. For example, a child's desire to eat nothing but candy could lead to serious health problems and diminish rather than increase well-being. In response, some modified versions of desire theories have been proposed to avoid this counterexample. They argue that only the satisfaction of well-informed desires contributes to well-being, excluding desires in which individuals do not fully consider or understand negative consequences. Another objection holds that desire satisfaction is only good in a derivative sense. It asserts that a person desires something because they believe that it is good, meaning that the value primarily resides in the desired object rather than in the satisfaction of the desire.

=== Objective list theories ===
Objective list theories state that a person's well-being depends on several factors. These factors can include subjective components, like pleasure and desire-satisfaction, but also encompass objective factors that enhance a person's well-being independent of whether they subjectively care about them. Objective list theorists have proposed diverse lists of items to cover a wide variety of elements contributing to well-being, such as health, friendship, achievement, knowledge, and autonomy. Some versions argue that each element on the list is valuable by itself, while others hold that they complement each other and only promote well-being when combined.

One criticism of objective list theories asserts that they define an incoherent concept of well-being by including diverse elements that have little in common. Another objection challenges the proposed objectivity of objective list theories, arguing that well-being is essentially a subjective phenomenon. According to this view, what is good for a person depends on their subjective attitude, and imposing an external definition of what is good leads to alienation.

=== Others ===
One categorization distinguishes between subjectivist, objectivist, and hybrid theories. Subjectivist theories understand well-being as a purely subjective phenomenon characterized by the individual's own perspective, mental states, and attitudes. Objectivist theories rely only on objective factors in their definition, like health and achievement. Hybrid theories incorporate both subjective and objective components. For example, one version states that well-being consists in the subjective appreciation of objective goods. (Note: Another distinction is between substantive theories, which are about what things are good for someone, and explanatory theories, which provide an account of why they are good for someone.)

A further distinction is between monist and pluralist theories. Monist theories hold that a single good is responsible for well-being, meaning that all types of well-being share the same essential features. Pluralist theories see well-being as a diverse phenomenon that manifests in many forms without a single essence characteristic of all of them. For instance, objective list theories are pluralist views, whereas hedonism and desire theories are monist views.

Eudaimonism has its roots in ancient philosophy, with Aristotle (384–322 BCE) as one of its main proponents.

Perfectionism identifies well-being with excellence by fulfilling human nature. (Note: Theories promoting this goal are also sometimes termed nature-fulfillment theories.) It holds that one needs to exercise and master key human abilities, such as rationality, knowledge, health, and dignity, to live well. As an objectivist perspective, perfectionism asserts that the value of these goods does not depend on what a person thinks about them. Eudaimonism is a closely related view, asserting that someone has high well-being or flourishes in life by actualizing their inborn potential. This view emphasizes that well-being is not a passive state but an active process. It manifests in an engaged lifestyle where individuals exercise virtues and rely on practical rationality to guide their decision-making.

Value fulfillment theories see the satisfaction of evaluative attitudes as the basis of well-being. They are similar to desire theories, which focus on desire satisfaction. However, value fulfillment theories adopt a broader perspective that considers diverse evaluative attitudes in addition to desires, such as beliefs, feelings, and judgments about what is good.

Most theories assume that the definition of well-being applies equally to everyone. Variabilism rejects this assumption and argues that different conceptions of well-being apply to different individuals. One form of variabilism asserts that the nature of well-being in children differs from that of adults. Similarly, some theories of well-being are species-relative, proposing that the essential features of well-being vary across distinct species, for example, that the well-being of humans differs from the well-being of non-human animals.

== Components and contributing factors ==
To avoid the deep disagreements surrounding the theories of the essential features of well-being, some researchers examine components and contributing factors, independent of whether they are integral parts or external causes. For example, there is wide agreement that positive emotions, achievements, interpersonal relationships, and health typically contribute to well-being in some form, despite academic disagreement about their precise roles.

=== Feelings, emotions, and life satisfaction ===
Diagram of the percentage of people of the world population that reported different levels of life satisfaction in the Gallup World Poll 2015–2017. For example, 25.3% reported a neutral life satisfaction of 5 on a scale from 0 to 10.

Pleasure promotes well-being as a positive feeling about what is attractive. Pain, by contrast, diminishes well-being as a negative feeling about what is aversive. Pleasure and pain are closely tied to the brain's reward system, influencing motivation and behavior by reinforcing beneficial actions and discouraging harmful ones. They shape how individuals perceive their lives and interact with their social and physical environments. Pleasure and pain are commonly seen as opposites that counterbalance each other. This view suggests that the negative value of experiencing intense pain can be compensated by the positive value of experiencing intense pleasure. A different perspective argues that their relation is more complex because they influence experience, motivation, and well-being in distinct ways that are not always symmetrical. Following this idea, one view holds that avoiding pain is more important than seeking pleasure.

Pleasure and pain are often tied to emotions, which are temporary states of arousal, such as joy, hope, anger, and fear. Emotions include subjective experiences of pleasure and pain alongside other psychological phenomena, such as the evaluative assessment of a situation and a disposition to engage in certain types of behavior. For example, fear evaluates a situation as dangerous and is associated with a behavioral disposition to flee. Additionally, emotions are linked to physiological changes, like sweating, and bodily expressions that signal the emotional state to others. (Note: Although these elements are characteristic of most emotions, the precise definition of emotions is disputed and some emotions lack certain elements.) High well-being is associated with frequent positive emotions and infrequent negative ones. Despite their unpleasantness, negative emotions are nonetheless integral to healthy functioning by making people aware of problems and steering behavior away from harmful outcomes. Emotions are closely related to moods, which usually last longer and have a less specific origin and evaluative assessment, such as cheerfulness, serenity, boredom, and depression. Moods typically shape well-being in more subtle ways by coloring perception and motivation over time, often without becoming the primary focus of attention.

Life satisfaction is a person's subjective judgment about how well their life is going. As a comprehensive evaluation, it is not limited to one particular domain, like employment or financial status. Instead, it considers all relevant areas of life. Similarly, it is not restricted to how a person currently feels but encompasses a long-term assessment of one's life as a whole across time. For example, a person may be overall satisfied with their life even if they are experiencing intense stomach pain at the moment. Individuals vary in how they arrive at their judgment of life satisfaction. For instance, some rely on instinctive gut feelings while others engage in deliberate and systematic reflections. Sometimes, individuals make inaccurate assessments and deceive themselves about their true quality of life, like cases of false happiness.

=== Achievements and meaning ===
Researchers also examine how achievements promote well-being, often by focusing on the sustained effort involved in setting a goal considered to be valuable and striving to actualize it. Achievements take many forms, such as earning an educational degree, attaining athletic success, contributing to scientific research, writing a well-received novel, starting a successful company, and bringing up a happy family. The contribution of achievements to well-being depends not only on their quantity but also on their significance. For example, a difficult achievement that helps many people, like finding a cure for cancer, may contribute more to the achiever's well-being than a trivial and pointless achievement, like determining the exact number of crumbs in a cookie jar. High achievement typically has a positive influence on other factors of well-being. For example, it can help a person make more friends and improve their standard of living. In some cases, however, it has negative side effects, like when an obsession with success increases anxiety and alienates loved ones.

Finding meaning in life is a closely related factor of well-being. A sense of purpose can organize a person's life and daily activities, motivate them to keep striving in the face of hardship, and produce positive emotions as they progress toward goals they consider valuable. It involves a judgment about the role and value of one's life in a wider context, but its precise characterization is disputed. Subjectivists argue that meaning is a subjective phenomenon. They suggest that people actively create it and make their lives meaningful by dedicating themselves to what they love. Objectivists contend that meaning does not depend on subjective preferences but is grounded in objective features of reality. Some people seek meaning by promoting concrete general values, like truth, moral goodness, and beauty. Others pursue it in religious practice by trying to realize a supernatural purpose. Further suggested sources of meaning include altruism, creativity, and self-actualization. The inability to find meaning in life can lead to an existential crisis, associated with anxiety and spiritual confusion.

=== Friendship and other relationships ===
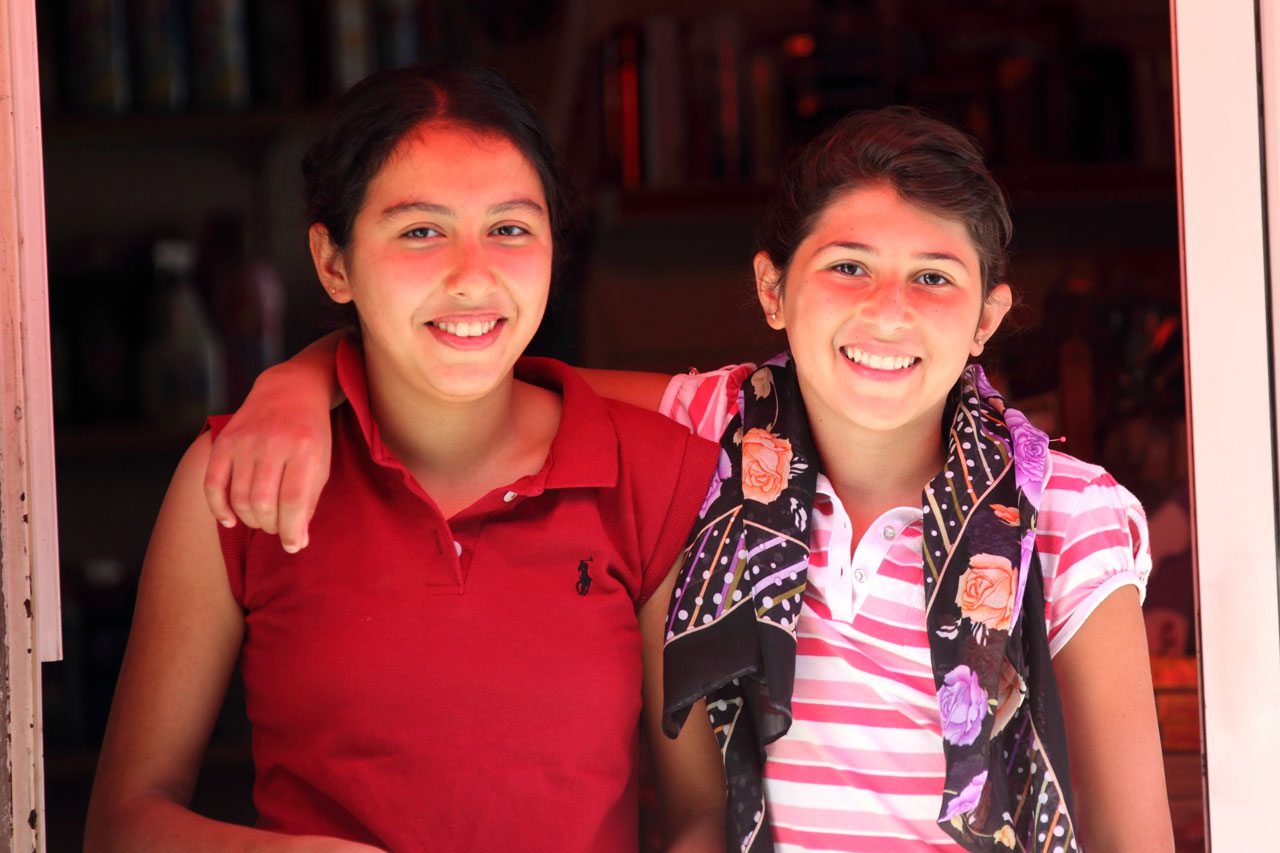
Friendship tends to promote well-being.

Positive social connections and interactions are further key elements of well-being. In addition to the intrinsic joy of engaging with others, social networks can offer material and emotional support during challenging times. They help people build trust, share values, promote the exchange of information, and provide access to new opportunities. Different types of social relationships may influence well-being in different ways, such as the contrasts between friends, family members, romantic partners, co-workers, and teammates. (Note: These categories are not exclusive. For example, a co-worker can be a friend at the same time.)

Researchers often focus specifically on the connection between friendship and well-being. Friendship is a voluntary social relationship between people characterized by mutual concern, trust, and support. Friends tend to spend time with each other, enjoy each other's company, and know personal facts about one another. Friendship can promote emotional support, a sense of belonging, self-esteem, practical guidance, and reduced stress. Different forms of friendship can influence well-being differently. A central aspect is the strength of the connection, distinguishing close friends from distant ones. Strength is determined by factors such as time spent together, trust, emotional intensity, and readiness to support each other in difficult times. (Note: Theorists also use other factors to distinguish types of friendship. For example, a friendship based on the enjoyment of each other's company is different from one based on achieving a common goal. An influential characterization by Aristotle holds that in the highest form of friendship, each friend cares about the other for the other's own sake.) The number of friends a person has is another relevant factor, and having many friends is usually beneficial. However, if a person already has numerous friends, making even more friends may not significantly impact their well-being. Some people prefer large friend networks with looser connections, while others have few but strong friendships.

=== Health and disabilities ===
Health can play a central role in how people live their lives, reflecting the overall condition in which an organism functions properly, both physically and mentally. Good physical health is associated with high energy and the ability to perform everyday activities. Physical illnesses and disabilities can negatively impact well-being by causing pain, limiting mobility, and reducing the capacity to engage in enjoyable or necessary activities. Good mental health is a state of internal equilibrium in which mental capacities function as they should. Mental disorders are associated with some form of psychological impairment: they typically disrupt the equilibrium by causing distress and may limit the activities a person can engage in. Discrimination can amplify the negative effects of socially stigmatized illnesses and disabilities.

Despite its general impact, health does not fully determine happiness, and some individuals affected by severe illnesses and disabilities report high levels of subjective well-being. The availability of healthcare services can mitigate negative effects by providing treatments to restore health or manage and alleviate symptoms. Similarly, adopting a healthy lifestyle, like regular physical activity and a balanced diet, is associated with long-term benefits to well-being.

=== Thought patterns and knowledge ===
Thought patterns can influence well-being positively or negatively by shaping how the world is interpreted and experienced. For example, frequent negative thoughts about past events can trigger anxiety and depressive moods. Accordingly, various psychotherapeutic and religious schools of thought propose methods and practices to promote thought patterns conducive to well-being. For example, a key element of cognitive behavior therapy is to identify and reframe automatic negative thoughts, while various Eastern religious traditions, such as Buddhism, recommend meditation and mindfulness. Related mental factors of well-being include tendencies that lead people to act against their own self-interest, such as impaired self-control in the form of addictions, and cognitive biases leading to irrational decisions. (Note: More broadly, well-being may also be influenced by a person's worldview as a set of basic beliefs and values that shape how people experience, understand, and interact with reality.)

Philosophers examine how knowledge affects well-being, like when knowledge helps people avoid dangers or solve problems. It is controversial whether all forms of knowledge contribute to well-being, such as the contrast between trivial knowledge of unimportant facts and practically relevant knowledge about oneself or deep insights into general truths of the world. In addition to knowledge, many related epistemic goods contribute to well-being, such as intelligence, problem-solving skills, creativity, open-mindedness, understanding, and wisdom. The value of epistemic goods is reflected in the emphasis given to education to foster the development of the minds of students. Education helps individuals understand and master their environment, promoting well-being by opening up new opportunities and increasing people's control over their lives.

=== Other components ===
Autonomy and freedom are often-discussed factors of well-being. They concern the possibility to choose, the ability to make informed decisions without coercion, and the capacity to act without being constrained by external forces. (Note: The exact definitions of these terms are disputed.) Individuals with a high level of autonomy and freedom tend to be more satisfied by having control over their lives. This enables them to decide between important options and choose a life that reflects their desires, preferences, and values. However, these conditions may not automatically lead to well-being and can sometimes have negative consequences. For example, a person lacking mental maturity and wisdom may freely engage in short-sighted pleasures with instant gratification while ignoring negative long-term consequences.

Eudaimonic conceptions of well-being stress the importance of character traits and virtues. Character traits are stable and consistent aspects of personality that influence how people think, feel, and act. Traits associated with well-being include wisdom, courage, kindness, justice, temperance, and gratitude. Virtues are character traits that promote ethical excellence, such as dispositions to act morally and follow ethical principles. Virtue-based theories of well-being argue that virtue can be its own reward, for example, because living a morally upright life can be a fulfilling experience. However, virtue and well-being may also conflict in some cases, for instance, when altruistic service to a greater good requires personal sacrifice.

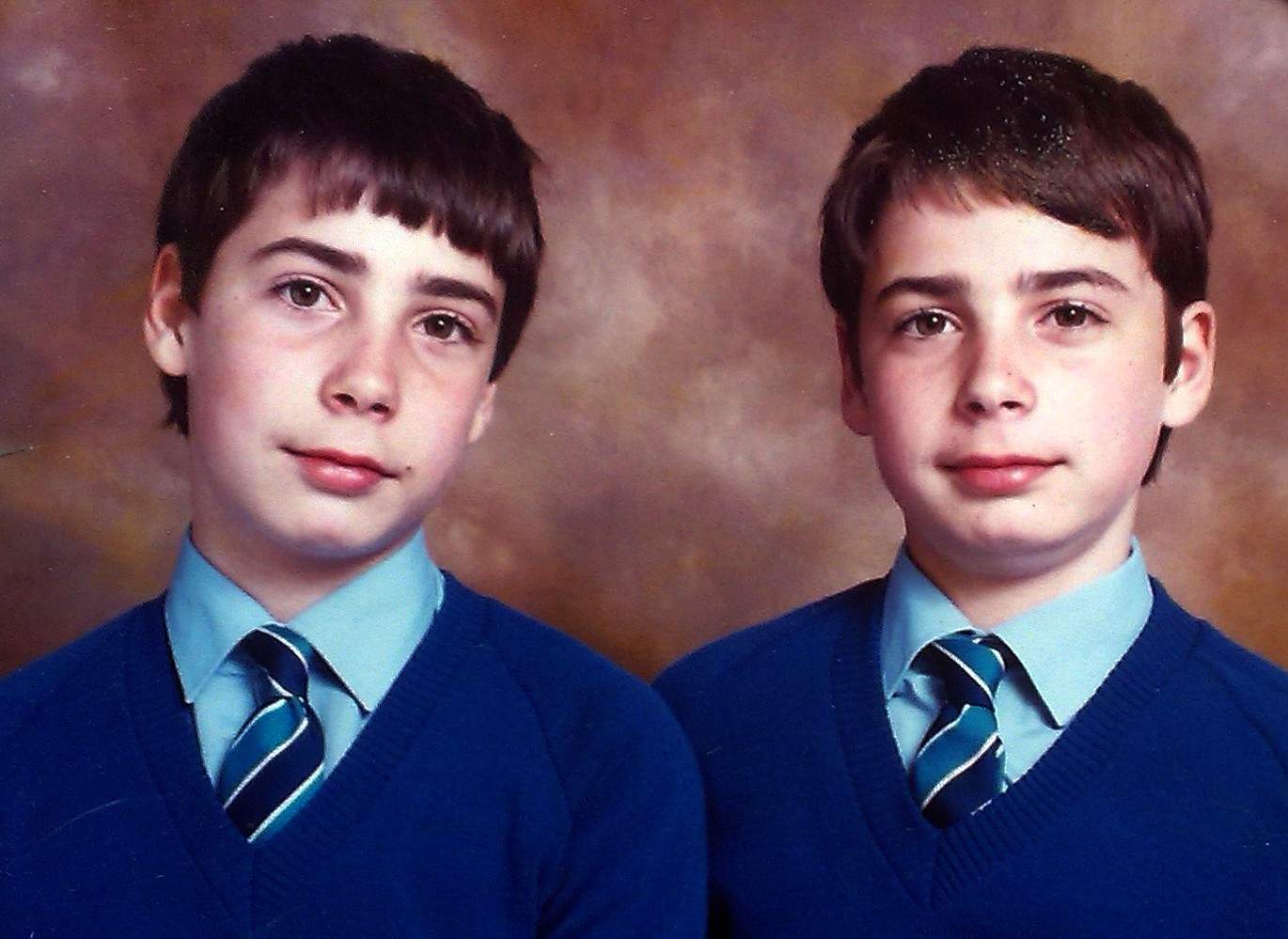
Genetic makeup can significantly impact the general level of well-being, as evidenced by findings that the life satisfaction of identical twins is more alike than that of non-identical twins.

Various work-related elements impact overall well-being, such as the character of the work performed, income, job security, work-life balance, and personal relationships to coworkers and superiors. (Note: Conversely, the well-being of workers also affects their productivity: unhappy workers tend to be less efficient and call in sick more often whereas happy workers are more motivated and tend to deliver higher-quality work.) Job loss and unemployment are associated with a decrease in well-being because of factors such as financial strain caused by lost wages, weakened social connections, and a reduced sense of purpose and social status. The government and political situation, another determinant, influences the happiness of the population by affecting security, equality, social services, and a general trust in society. Accordingly, governments that uphold the rule of law, provide good services, and control corruption tend to foster higher levels of well-being. Opportunities to democratically participate in political decision-making are also linked to increased well-being. Similarly, the physical environment plays a role, with factors like housing conditions, pollution, noise, and access to nature and recreational areas.

The genetic makeup can significantly impact the general level of a person's well-being, with some studies suggesting that genetic influences can explain up to one third of the differences in subjective well-being. For example, the life satisfaction of identical twins, who share genes, is more alike than the life satisfaction of non-identical twins. Other relevant biological factors include neurotransmitters and hormones.

Well-being changes throughout the lifespan as individuals transition from childhood through adolescence and adulthood to old age, reflecting factors such as educational and occupational responsibilities, family life, financial stability, and health. Well-being tends to decline from childhood until around age 40 globally. There are region-specific differences for the second part of life: some regions see a further decline towards old age, while the level remains stable in others and increases in some. There is little gender difference in well-being in most countries.

Digital technologies, such as the internet and artificial intelligence, influence the well-being of individuals in various areas, such as information access, social relationships, work-life balance, and health. The effects are mixed, including benefits, like new learning opportunities, and risks, like social media addiction. In many areas, a proper understanding of the uses and dangers of a technology is essential for avoiding its potential harmful effects.

=== Models ===
According to Ed Diener's tripartite model, subjective well-being consists of frequent positive affect, infrequent negative affect, and life satisfaction.

Models of well-being are frameworks for understanding and measuring well-being. They clarify its nature and seek to show how its different components and contributing factors interact. Psychologist Ed Diener's tripartite model identifies three essential components of subjective well-being: the presence of positive affect, the absence of negative affect, and a positive evaluation of one's life as a whole. Psychologist Carol Ryff proposed the six-factor model of psychological well-being. It states that the main elements are self-acceptance, personal growth, purpose in life, environmental mastery, autonomy, and positive relations with others. Focusing on social well-being, sociologist Corey Keyes developed a five-component model based on social integration, social contribution, social coherence, social actualization, and social acceptance.

According to Martin Seligman's PERMA theory, well-being has five elements: positive emotions, engagement by following one's interests, interpersonal relationships, finding meaning in life, and accomplishments in the pursuit of success and mastery. Psychologist Michael Bishop developed the network model of well-being, which includes components such as feelings, emotions, attitudes, traits, and interactions with one's environment. This model emphasizes that the different components form a causal network by influencing and reinforcing each other in complex ways.

== In various fields ==
As a central goal of many individual and societal endeavors, well-being is relevant to many fields of inquiry. Grouped under the umbrella term science of well-being, some disciplines investigate the nature and components of well-being directly, while others study its causes, effects, or correlates in specific domains of life. A central motivation of academic inquiry is the belief that well-being can be improved through appropriate measures. Some of these measures focus on individual lifestyle changes. Others take the form of societal interventions to alter how economic, medical, educational, workplace, and political institutions function.

=== Positive psychology ===
Positive psychology is the branch of psychology dedicated to the study of well-being and related phenomena, like happiness and flourishing. It examines the factors and conditions of optimal human functioning. This inquiry focuses both on individual factors, like the experience of pleasure and pain and the role of character traits, and on societal factors, such as the way social institutions influence human well-being.

At the emotional level, positive psychologists examine the different types of positive emotions, such as joy, amusement, and love. They seek to understand the conditions under which positive emotions arise, how they contribute to overall well-being, and how they differ from negative emotions. At the cognitive level, positive psychology studies how intelligence, wisdom, and creativity improve quality of life. It further explores the relation between cognitive and affective processes, for example, how cognitive interpretations evoke emotions and how emotions prompt thought processes.

Another central subfield concerns the role of personality, in particular, how individuals differ regarding personality traits and how these traits impact well-being. The VIA model, an influential framework in positive psychology, analyzes personality based on six main virtues: wisdom, courage, humanity, justice, temperance, and transcendence. A closely related topic focuses on the role of the self, which encompasses the way a person conceptualizes and imagines themselves. Important factors for well-being are self-esteem, or how a person evaluates themselves, and authenticity, or the degree to which a person's behavior is subjectively consistent with their sense of self. A further area explores the role of social and physical circumstances. This includes the effects of trust and cooperation on group well-being and dilemmas in which self-interest conflicts with group interest. Having close relationships and engaging in altruistic behavior are generally beneficial to a person's well-being.

In addition to the study of the different components and causes of well-being, positive psychologists seek to understand how well-being changes over time. For example, they examine the effects of major negative events, such as the death of a child or bankruptcy, and the psychological features that help some people maintain their level of well-being despite significant adversity, such as self-regulation and an optimistic outlook. Another key topic is the problem of interventions or how to design and implement methods to reliably increase well-being. Researchers explore a wide range of strategies, including cognitive reframing, cultivating gratitude, acts of kindness toward others, and different forms of meditation. The possibility of creating long-term gains in well-being is challenged by the set-point theory—the hypothesis that each person has a stable level of subjective well-being. It suggests that this level is mostly fixed by factors that are hereditary or determined early in life, implying that any change to well-being is only temporary and will eventually revert to the individual's baseline.

=== Philosophy ===
While positive psychologists focus on empirical research of specific factors, philosophers place more emphasis on the general nature, overall function, and conceptual foundations of well-being. They explore its essential features by developing and comparing theories of well-being, such as hedonistic theories, desire theories, and objective list theories. Philosophers also investigate the foundational principles of the scientific study of well-being. Considering that well-being has both subjective and evaluative aspects, they seek to determine whether scientific objectivity is possible and to what extent well-being can be quantified and compared between individuals. (Note: The topic of quantification also concerns problems of aggregation, like the questions of how individual components of well-being determine overall well-being, how the well-being of individuals is related to group well-being, and how well-being at different moments is combined into well-being over extended periods.)

Some philosophers challenge the concept of well-being, understood as what is ultimately good for someone. For instance, philosopher G. E. Moore (1873–1958) rejects the idea that something can be good relative to a person, asserting instead that all values are impersonal. Another criticism suggests that the concept of well-being is incoherent, arguing that it groups together diverse elements without a shared essence.

Despite these criticisms, well-being plays a central role in ethics and value theory. Welfarism is the view that well-being is the only basic source of value. It holds that everything else, like intelligence and health care, is only valuable to the extent that it promotes well-being and reduces ill-being. Pure welfarists argue that the raw sum of everyone's (Note: Some definitions are limited to the well-being of humans while others take the well-being of all sentient creatures into account.) well-being is all that matters. Impure welfarists consider additional factors, such as ensuring that well-being is distributed equally among people. This modification aims to avoid situations in which some people have abundantly good lives at the expense of others who experience severe deprivation. (Note: A closely related discussion is between atomists and holists about well-being. Their disagreements touch on questions like whether momentary well-being is more basic than well-being over extended periods of time and whether the temporal order of episodes of well-being matters.)

Another topic concerns the relation between moral virtue and well-being. According to one view, already considered in ancient Greek philosophy, the two always accompany each other, meaning it is in everyone's self-interest to act virtuously. An alternative perspective denies this close connection, stating that, at least in some cases, a virtuous person has to compromise their own well-being for the greater good. Philosophers further explore the relation between well-being and death. One position questions the common-sense idea that death is generally bad for a person. It argues that since death marks the end of a person's existence, there is nothing that can benefit or harm the person anymore. Animal ethicists apply the concept of well-being to non-human animals, examining what animal well-being consists in and how it affects the moral obligations of humans toward non-human animals. Commonly discussed factors of animal well-being include adequate food, shelter, and social interaction, and the fulfillment of species-specific needs. (Note: Welfare biology, a related field, examines whether all sentient beings are capable of well-being, under what conditions their welfare is positive or negative, and how this can be measured.)

=== Other fields ===
Welfare economics studies the influence of economic activity on well-being. One of its primary goals is to develop standards for evaluating and choosing between competing policy proposals based on their potential benefit to well-being. This field uses metrics such as distribution of income, gross domestic product, consumer surplus, and compensating variation. For example, distributing income more equally is usually beneficial for well-being but needs to be balanced against potential negative side effects, such as a decline in productivity. The economics of happiness, a closely related field, focuses specifically on the connection between economic phenomena and individual happiness. One of its findings is the Easterlin paradox: within a given country, people with higher incomes tend to be happier than those with lower income, yet overall happiness does not trend upward as the average income of everyone increases.

The World Happiness Index (2023) measures levels of happiness worldwide. (Note: The image shows mostly high happiness in Northern and Western Europe, North America, Australia, and New Zealand. Latin America and much of East Asia show moderate happiness levels, while Eastern Europe and the Middle East are mixed. Lower levels are found in various countries in Sub-Saharan Africa and South Asia.)

The growing academic interest in well-being is also reflected in the political sphere, challenging the gross domestic product as the main indicator of national success. As a result, indices to track, compare, and promote the well-being of populations have been established at both national and international levels. Examples include the World Happiness Report, the OECD Better Life Index, Bhutan's Gross National Happiness, and the UK Measures of National Well-being. Following this trend, policymakers are relying on well-being metrics and related factors to inform their decision-making processes. (Note: These efforts are often linked to welfare states, which aim to promote the social and economic well-being of their populations through measures such as affordable healthcare, social security, and universal access to education.) For instance, they may use the WELLBY scale to quantify how policy decisions influence the well-being of large populations. (Note: One WELLBY equals one point in a 10-point scale of self-reported life satisfaction over one year. Accordingly, researchers can evaluate different policy initiatives by comparing which one yields a higher total of WELLBYs.) The study of well-being also affects the field of law, where considerations about how to protect and promote well-being can influence legislation. (Note: For example, the UK's Care Act 2014 gives local authorities a general duty to promote the well-being of individuals.)

Sociologists examine the relation between well-being and social phenomena, such as race, socioeconomic status, and education. They use both subjective and objective metrics, with some studies dedicated to well-being in general, while others focus on specific domains, such as work, family, and housing, or on particular demographic groups, such as employees or the elderly.

Anthropologists are interested in the concept of well-being in different cultures. They seek to understand what people at different times and places associate with a good life, such as the culture-specific norms, values, and practices for achieving personal well-being. A key assumption in this field is that the concept of well-being involves a commitment to what is desirable, functioning as an evaluative framework for guiding behavior and assessing lifestyles. Anthropologists compare these commitments and frameworks across different cultures, like the differences between Western and non-Western conceptions of well-being. They describe the similarities and differences, typically without taking a position on which view is superior. (Note: Some researchers argue that standard measuring practices are biased toward Western perspectives and lead to results that are not globally representative. For example, several studies about the positive effects of spending time in nature were criticized for privileging the perspective of Western metropolitan dwellers while neglecting other groups, such as rural indigenous people.)

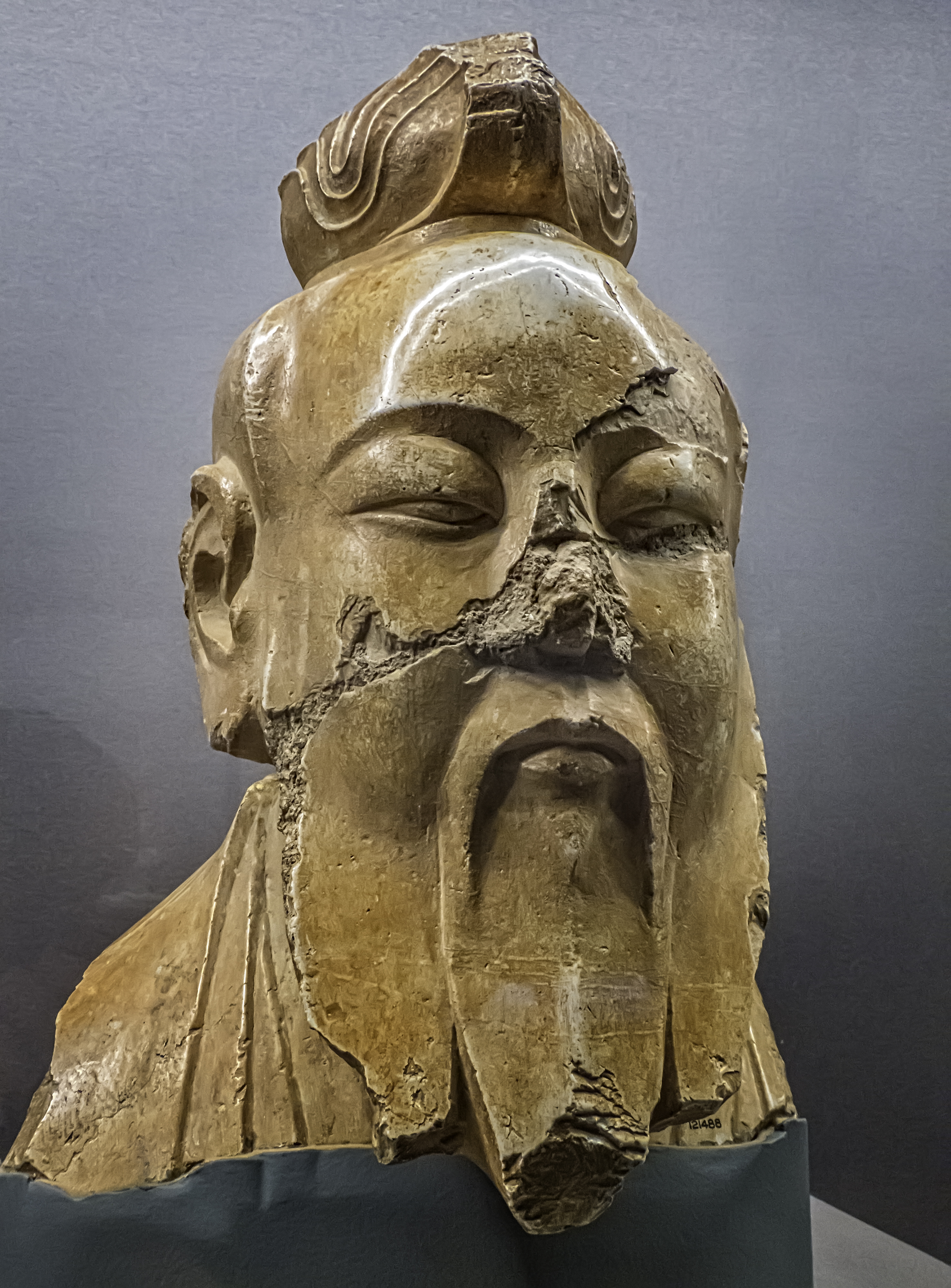
According to Laozi's Taoism, well-being is achieved by acting in harmony with nature.

Diverse perspectives on well-being are found in religious and other traditional belief systems, where well-being often serves as a goal of spiritual practice. In various traditional forms of Hinduism, the highest kind of well-being is not determined by objective external conditions. Instead, it depends primarily on experiential knowledge of the self, brought about through practices like self-inquiry and meditation. Buddhism identifies suffering as a central aspect of all existence. It aims to produce well-being by eliminating the causes of suffering, such as desire and ignorance, achieved through the practice of Buddhist virtues, like compassion, loving-kindness, and equanimity. From the perspective of Confucianism, well-being consists in virtuous activity as a process leading to sagehood and is associated with harmonious relationships and social responsibility. According to Taoism, a life high in well-being is characterized by effortless action that is in harmony with the Tao—the natural way of the universe—and guided by spontaneous dispositions. The Christian tradition holds that the personal connection to God is a central factor of well-being, which may manifest in virtuous activity or contemplation of God. According to the teachings of Islam, well-being is achieved by dedicating one's life as much as possible to worshiping Allah and fulfilling His will, as expressed in the Quran.

Well-being is also a topic in various biological sciences with a focus on physiological factors. Research from twin studies suggests that genetic composition is an impactful determinant. Other physiological factors include neurotransmitters and hormones that impact positive feelings, such as endorphin, dopamine, serotonin, oxytocin, and cortisol. Biologists are also interested in the evolutionary origins of subjective well-being. This perspective understands happiness and unhappiness not as ends but as tools to regulate behavior, guiding it toward fitness-enhancing outcomes. It holds that subjective well-being is a product of natural selection: its underlying hereditary traits are passed on to future generations if they promote survival and reproduction. In neuroscience, researchers try to uncover the neural correlates of well-being using neuroimaging techniques, such as functional magnetic resonance imaging.

The problem of well-being plays a central role in medicine since medical interventions typically aim to restore, secure, and enhance patient well-being. Considerations of well-being also affect the treatment of incurable diseases, like Parkinson's disease. In such cases, therapies aim to minimize negative effects, helping patients lead productive and fulfilling lives despite their illness. However, well-being is not the only consideration governing medical interventions, and the commitment to patient autonomy is another core principle. This can lead to conflicts when patients act against their self-interest and reject treatments that would improve their well-being.

== History ==
=== Ancient and medieval ===
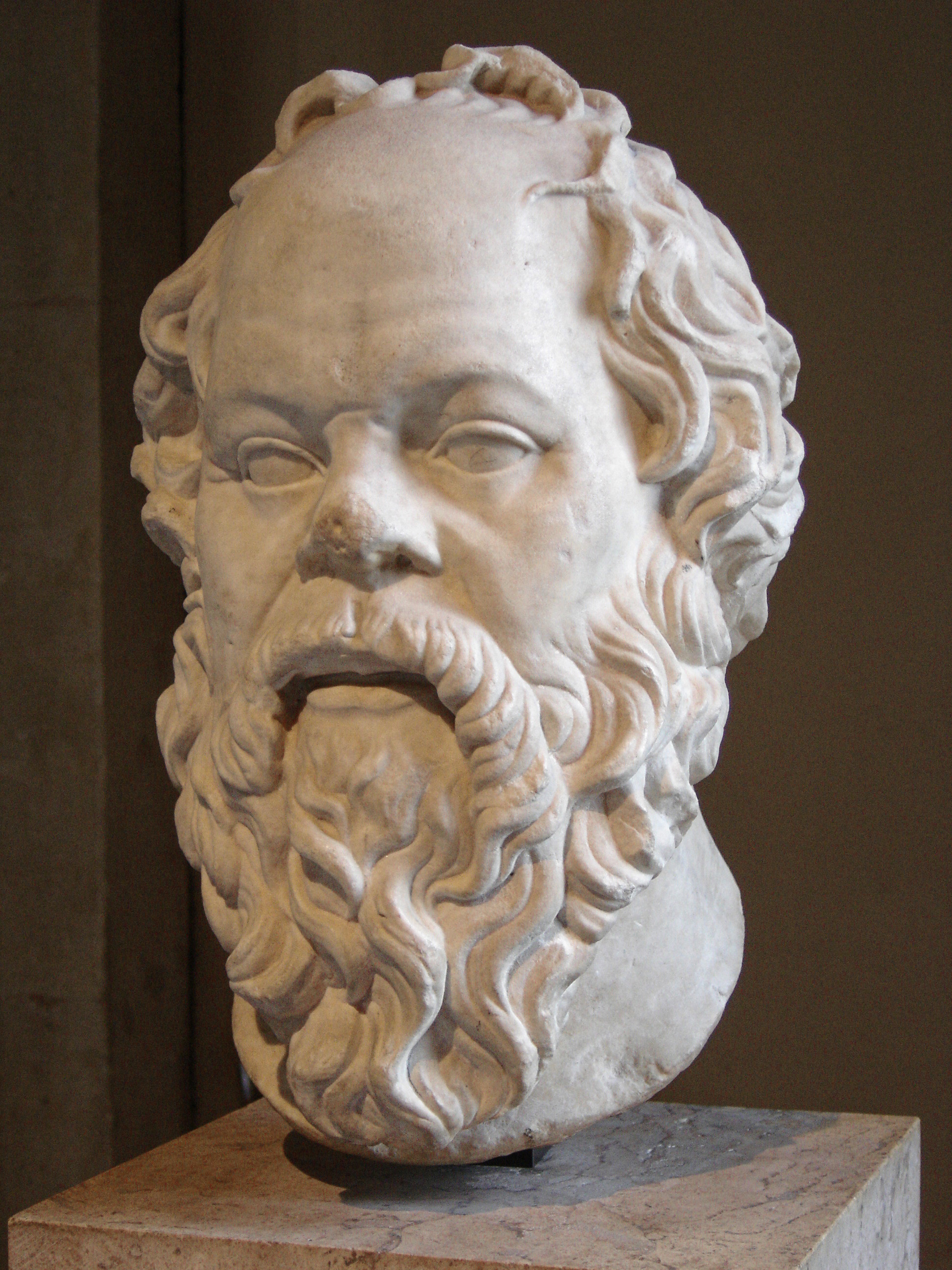
Socrates held that wisdom and virtue are key elements of well-being.

The study of well-being originated in antiquity, often in the form of discussions on how to lead a good life. Socrates (c. 470 – c. 399 BCE) rejected power, fame, wealth, and the hedonistic pursuit of pleasure as paths to lasting happiness, arguing instead that wisdom and virtue are key elements of well-being. He held that lifelong learning and philosophical reflection cultivate an examined life, promote moral excellence, and align with the good. Influenced by Socrates, Aristotle (384–322 BCE) developed a eudaimonic theory of well-being. He maintained that well-being is the purpose of life and is achieved primarily by practicing virtues, such as acting in accordance with reason, justice, courage, and temperance. Aristotle distinguished three general factors that contribute to well-being: goods of the soul, such as intellectual and moral virtues; goods of the body, such as health; and external goods, such as wealth and good relations to others. In Hellenistic philosophy, starting in the 4th century BCE, the Epicureans and the Stoics considered well-being an internal state independent of external conditions. The Epicureans argued that pleasure is the only source of well-being and that it is best achieved through moderation and the cultivation of a tranquil state of mind. The Stoics emphasized discipline and rational virtue as the key to well-being.

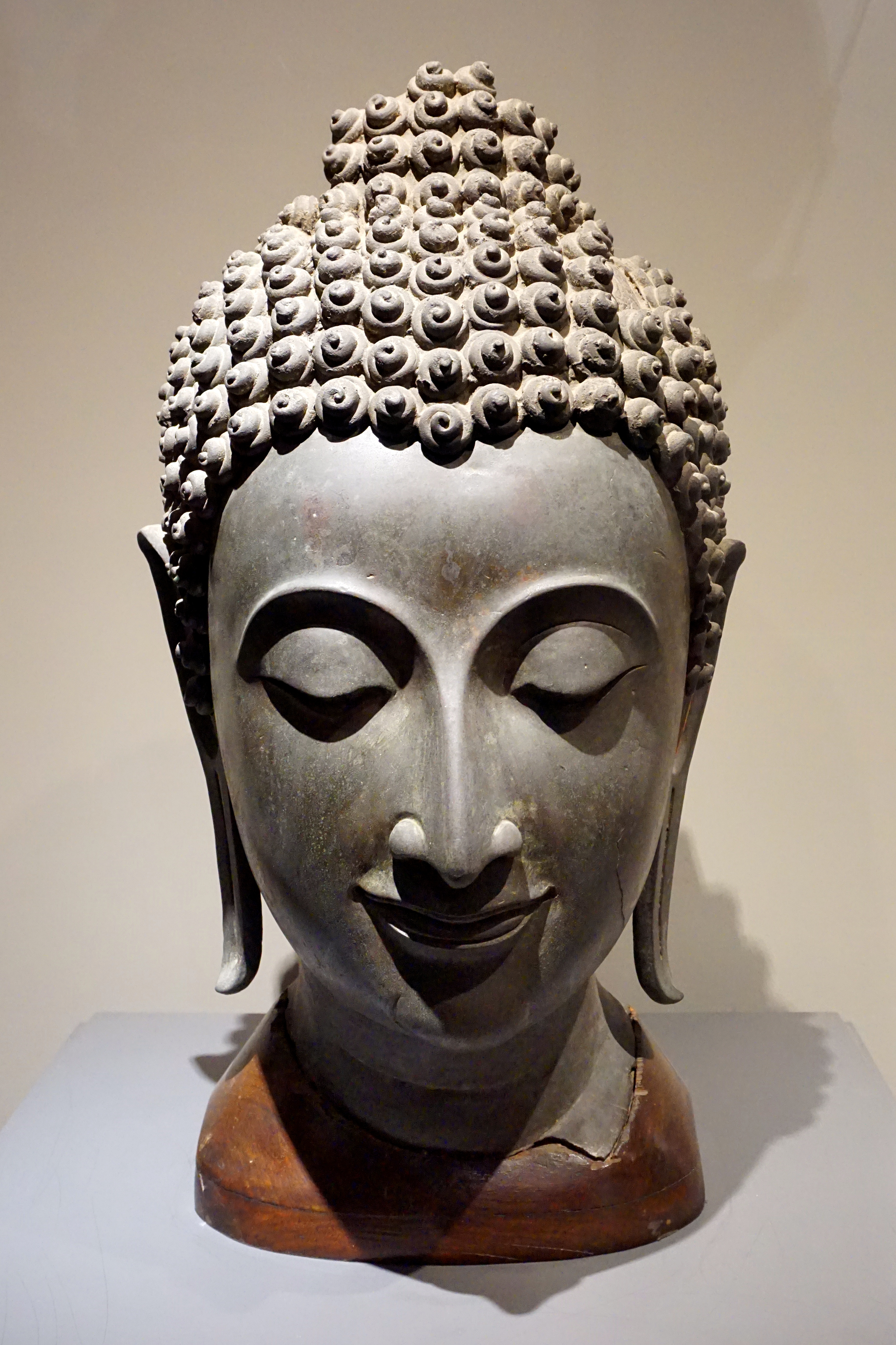
The avoidance of suffering is a central element of the Buddhist conception of well-being.

In ancient India, various teachings about well-being are found in the Hindu tradition, formulated in the first two millennia BCE in the Vedas, Upanishads, and the Smriti literature. They include the ideas that a person should fulfill their duty relative to their social role and stage of life, and that one should attain knowledge about how the self and the world are ultimately one. A central element of the Buddhist conception of well-being is the avoidance of suffering. The Buddha (roughly 6th century BCE) identified craving as the root cause of suffering, proposing a set of practical recommendations, such as right conduct and mindfulness, to overcome it. In ancient China, Confucius (6th to 5th century BCE) emphasized the role of social virtues in leading a good life, with a particular focus on benevolence or humaneness. In the Taoist tradition, Laozi (6th century BCE) (Note: It is controversial whether this period is accurate and some researchers suggest that Laozi was not a historical person but a mythological figure assembled from multiple Taoist sages.) saw living in harmony with the natural order of the universe through effortless, spontaneous action as the ideal form of life.

During the medieval period in the West, Christian thinkers associated well-being with spiritual salvation. Augustine (354–430 CE) argued that humans are not fully in control of their well-being and instead depend on divine grace. He maintained that true happiness is achievable only in the afterlife. Thomas Aquinas (1225–1274 CE) similarly emphasized the role of the divine, proposing that a beatific vision of God is the highest form of well-being. A religion-focused conception of well-being is also found in the Islamic tradition and the teachings of the Quran, which asserts that material pleasures are temporary and that genuine well-being depends on religious faith and complete dedication to Allah.

=== Modern and contemporary ===
In the modern period, secularization and scientific progress shifted the focus from religious theories to naturalistic explanations, particularly starting in the late 17th century with the Age of Enlightenment. Voltaire (1694–1778), Jean-Jacques Rousseau (1712–1778), Denis Diderot (1713–1784), Adam Smith (1723–1790), and François-Jean de Chastellux (1734–1788) rejected a religious focus on otherworldly well-being, emphasizing instead the pursuit of earthly happiness through reason, empirical inquiry, and social progress.

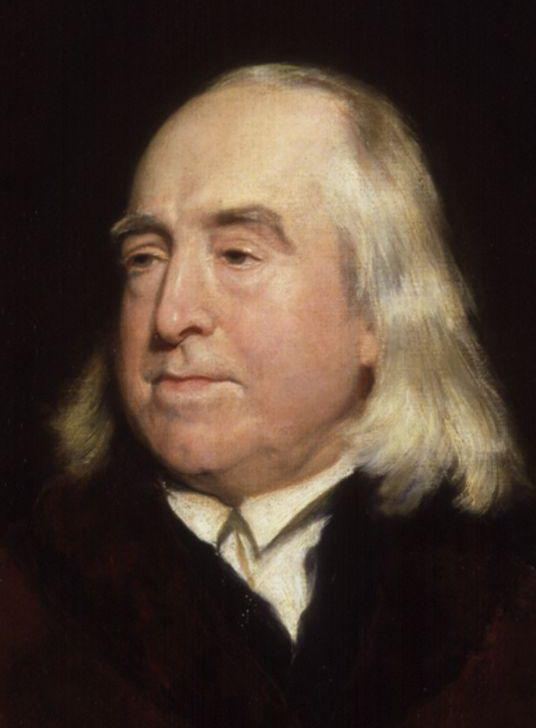
Jeremy Bentham proposed the felicific calculus as a method to measure, compare, and aggregate degrees of pleasure and pain.

As the father of classical utilitarianism, Jeremy Bentham (1748–1832) proposed the felicific calculus as a method to measure, compare, and aggregate degrees of pleasure and pain, considering factors such as their intensity and duration. He also suggested a direct link between well-being and right action, arguing that individuals and governments should promote "the greatest happiness of the greatest number". His student John Stuart Mill (1806–1873) modified Bentham's idea, proposing that the contribution to well-being depends on the quality of the pleasure. He held that higher pleasures of the mind are more valuable than lower pleasures of the body, even if they have the same intensity and duration. Thomas Carlyle (1795–1881) rejected the utilitarian pursuit of happiness and the individualist market economy associated with Adam Smith, arguing instead that a sense of community and meaningful work are essential to well-being.

The emergence of psychology as an empirical science prompted research into the internal factors of well-being, such as William James's (1842–1910) introspective research into the connection between happiness and religious experience. The psychoanalytic theory of Sigmund Freud (1856–1939) characterized the pursuit of pleasure and the reduction of tension as central aims of life. His early collaborator Carl Jung (1875–1961) explored how well-being depends on individuation as a form of psychological growth in which conscious and unconscious aspects are integrated.

After the Second World War, researchers began conducting large-scale surveys and proposing broad social indicators to track well-being within nations and in cross-national comparisons. Based on their results, Richard Easterlin (1926–2024) formulated the Easterlin paradox—the observation that richer individuals in a nation report higher happiness than poorer ones, although the average happiness of the population does not increase as the nation's average income rises.

Various models of well-being were proposed in the second half of the 20th century and the beginning of the 21st century, including Ed Diener's (1946–2021) tripartite model of subjective well-being, Carol Ryff's (born 1950) six-factor model of psychological well-being, and Martin Seligman's (born 1942) PERMA model. Derek Parfit (1942–2017) analyzed traditional theories of well-being and introduced the influential distinction between hedonism, desire theories, and objective list theories.

Another key development was the emergence of positive psychology in the late 1990s, focusing on human flourishing and optimal functioning in contrast to the traditional emphasis of psychological research on illness and dysfunction. The 20th and 21st centuries also saw growing interest in the relation between well-being, economy, and public policy, as governments and international organizations began integrating research on well-being into political decision-making.

== See also ==
- Comfort – Sense of physical or psychological ease
- Flourishing – Positive psychological and social functioning
- Gross National Well-being – Socioeconomic development and measurement framework
- Lived experience – Phenomenological concept
- Prosperity – Concept of economies regarding wealth, health, happiness, community and spirit
- Satisfaction paradox – Phenomenon where negative circumstances have little impact on well-being
- Welfare spending – Means-oriented social benefit
- Wellbeing economy – Public policy framework
- Workplace wellness – Healthy behavior in the workplace
