= Flourishing =

Positive psychological and social functioning

Flourishing, or human flourishing, is the complete goodness or well-being of humans in a developmental life-span, that includes positive psychological functioning and positive social functioning, along with other basic goods.

The term is rooted in ancient philosophical and theological usages. Aristotle's term eudaimonia is one source for understanding human flourishing. The Hebrew Scriptures, or the Old Testament, also speak of flourishing, as they compare the just person to a growing tree. Christian Scriptures, or the New Testament, build upon Jewish usage and speak of flourishing as it can exist in heaven. The medieval theologian Thomas Aquinas drew from Aristotle as well as the Bible, and utilized the notion of flourishing in his philosophical theology.

More recently, the positive psychology of Martin Seligman, Corey Keyes, Barbara Fredrickson, and others, have expanded and developed the notion of human flourishing. Empirical studies, such as those of the Harvard Human Flourishing Program, and practical applications, indicate the importance of the concept and the increasingly widespread use of the term in business, economics, and politics. In positive psychology, flourishing is "when people experience positive emotions, positive psychological functioning and positive social functioning, most of the time," living "within an optimal range of human functioning." It is a descriptor and measure of positive mental health and overall life well-being, and includes multiple components and concepts, such as cultivating strengths, subjective well-being, "goodness, generativity, growth, and resilience." In this view, flourishing is the opposite of both pathology and languishing, which are described as living a life that feels hollow and empty.

== Etymology and definition ==
Although "flourishing" could refer to the general healthy state of a plant as it grows, properly speaking it is the stage in a vascular plant's morphogenesis, specifically the stage of growth when it develops flowers.

=== Etymology ===
The English term "flourish" comes from the Latin florere, "to bloom, blossom, flower," from the Latin flos, "a flower." To contrast the term with a plant's lack of full development, "flourish" came to indicate growth or development with vigor. Around 1597, the term came to include the notion of prosperity, insofar as a to bear flowers is an indication of the fullness of life and productivity.

=== Definitions ===
As an obvious consequence of the widespread use of the term "flourishing" in different fields and by different authors, there is not a general consensus about a definition of flourishing.

For instance, there is also a lot of debate about the mutual relations between flourishing and some related concepts, as the Aristotelian concept of eudaimonia, and the concepts of happiness and well-being. According to a Neo-Aristotelian view, the concept of human flourishing offers an explanation of the human good that is objective, inclusive, individualized, agent-relative, self-directed and social. It views human flourishing objectively because it is desirable and appealing. Flourishing is a state of being rather than a feeling or experience. It comes from engaging in activities that both express and produce the actualization of one's potential.

According to some voices in Positive Psychology, flourishing is a "descriptor of positive mental health." According to Fredrickson and Losada, flourishing is living

...within an optimal range of human functioning, one that connotes goodness, generativity, growth, and resilience."

According to the Mental Health Foundation of New Zealand, flourishing

...is a state where people experience positive emotions, positive psychological functioning and positive social functioning, most of the time. In more philosophical terms this means access to the pleasant life, the engaged or good life and the meaningful life (Note: A reference to Seligman's Authentic Happiness; see Positive psychology#Initial theory: three paths to happiness.) [...] It requires the development of attributes and social and personal levels that exhibit character strengths and virtues that are commonly agreed across different cultures (Seligman, Steen, Park and Peterson, 2005). On the other hand languishing includes states of experience where people describe their lives as "hollow" or "empty" (Fredrickson & Lahoda, 2005).

According to Keyes, mental health does not imply an absence of mental illness. Rather, mental health is a "separate dimension of positive feelings and functioning." Individuals described as flourishing have a combination of high levels of emotional well-being, psychological well-being, and social well-being. Flourishing people are happy and satisfied; they tend to see their lives as having a purpose; they feel some degree of mastery and accept all parts of themselves; they have a sense of personal growth in the sense that they are always growing, evolving, and changing; finally, they have a sense of autonomy and an internal locus of control, they chose their fate in life instead of being victims of fate.

Psychologist Martin Seligman, one of the founding fathers of happiness research, wrote in his book, Flourish, a new model for happiness and well-being based on positive psychology. This book expounds on simple exercises that anyone can do to create a happier life and to flourish. Flourish, is a tool to understand happiness by emphasizing how the five pillars of Positive Psychology, also known as PERMA, increase the quality of life for people who apply it to their lives.

According to Fredrickson and Losada, flourishing is characterized by four main components: goodness, generative, growth, and resilience.

According to Keyes, only 18.1% of Americans are actually flourishing. The majority of Americans can be classified as mentally unhealthy (depressed) or not mentally healthy or flourishing (moderately mentally healthy/languishing).

Tyler J. VanderWeele, a prominent epidemiologist and expert in biostatistics who has extensively studied human flourishing, has proposed the following, quite different, definition:

Flourishing itself might be understood as a state in which all aspects of a person's life are good. We might also refer to such a state as complete human well-being, which is again arguably a broader concept than psychological well-being. Conceptions of what constitutes flourishing will be numerous and views on the concept will differ. However, I would argue that, regardless of the particulars of different understandings, most would concur that flourishing, however conceived, would, at the very least, require doing or being well in the following five broad domains of human life: (i) happiness and life satisfaction; (ii) health, both mental and physical; (iii) meaning and purpose; (iv) character and virtue; and (v) close social relationships. All are arguably at least a part of what we mean by flourishing. [...]If, however, we think about flourishing not only as a momentary state but also as something that is sustained over time, then one might also argue that a state of flourishing should be such that resources, financial and otherwise, are sufficiently stable so that what is going well in each of these five domains is likely to continue into the future for some time to come.[...] I would in no way claim that these domains above entirely characterize flourishing. [...] I would only argue here that, whatever else flourishing might consist in, these five domains above would also be included, and thus these five domains above may provide some common ground for discussion.

=== Summary ===
To summarize the definitions above: Human flourishing is the ongoing fulfillment of human capacities within given contexts by advancing one's own good and the common good.

In order to better understand this synthesis, one has to keep in mind that, in the view of Aristotle and Thomas Aquinas, a capacity of a being is a potential stemming from its nature to perform certain kinds of activities, or to undergo certain kinds of changes in accordance with its inner dynamism. For instance, the capacity to bear fruit or the capacity to grow are within a tree's natural potential. On the other hand, the common good is some good—whether material or non-material—that has four characteristics: it is specific, in the sense that it is not general good-in-itself; it is objective, that is, it exists outside of the individual and is independent from the existence of any particular person; it is collective, for it exists only within some community; it is shareable, that is, many people can participate, enjoy, or use it simultaneously.

== Aristotle and Flourishing ==
=== Aristotle and biology ===
The Greek philosopher, Aristotle, contributed greatly to a deeper understanding of flourishing as a model for human life. While better-known for his work in metaphysics and logic, he also made significant contributions as a biologist. His understanding of the development of flora and fauna, seen especially in his work Generation of Animals, provided a scientific background for recognizing a similar development in the human being.

=== Eudaimonia ===
Aristotle's term for the optimal state of the human being is eudaimonia (Greek: εὐδαίμονία). He gives various definitions and descriptions of eudaimonia, in the Nicomachean Ethics, the Eudemian Ethics, and in his Politics, among which:

- "The active exercise of his soul's faculties in conformity with excellence or virtue, or if there be several human excellences or virtues, in conformity with the best and most perfect among them. Moreover this activity must occupy a complete lifetime; for one swallow does not make spring, nor does one fine day; and similarly one day or a brief period of happiness does not make a man supremely blessed and happy."
- "Happiness therefore is co-extensive in its range with contemplation: the more a class of beings possesses the faculty of contemplation, the more it enjoys happiness, not as an accidental concomitant of contemplation but as inherent in it, since contemplation is valuable in itself. It follows that happiness is some form of contemplation."
- "So, as the function of the soul and of its excellence must be one and the same, the function of its excellence is a good life. This, then, is the final good, that we agreed to be happiness. It is evident from our assumptions (happiness was assumed to be the best thing, and ends-the best among goods-are in the soul; but things in the soul are states or activities), since the activity is better than the disposition, and the best activity is of the best state, and virtue is the best state, that the activity of the virtue of the soul must be the best thing. But happiness too was said to be the best thing: so happiness is the activity of a good soul. Now as happiness was agreed to be something complete, and life may be complete or incomplete-and this holds with excellence also (in the one case it is total, in the other partial)-and the activity of what is incomplete is itself incomplete, happiness must be activity of a complete life in accordance with complete virtue."
- "Happiness is the complete activity and employment of virtue, and this not conditionally but absolutely. When I say 'conditionally' I refer to things necessary, by 'absolutely' I mean nobly: for instance, to take the case of just actions, just acts of vengeance and of punishment spring it is true from virtue, but are necessary, and have the quality of nobility only in a limited manner (since it would be preferable that neither individual nor state should have any need of such things), whereas actions aiming at honours and resources are the noblest actions absolutely; for the former class of acts consist in the removal of something evil, but actions of the latter kind are the opposite – they are the foundation and the generation of things good."

Sometimes eudaimonia is translated as "happiness"; other times, as "welfare" or "well-being," showing that no translation is fully adequate to capture its meaning in Greek.

Philosopher Joe Sachs emphasizes the importance of the activity of eudaimonia, a "being-at-work" of the human soul. This indicates that "flourishing" can adequately translate eudaimonia, insofar as the term signifies the dynamism of the principle of life and growth within a human.

== Biblical theology ==
=== Old Testament ===
The Hebrew Bible, known by Christians as the Old Testament, contains many references to human flourishing that have influenced Western philosophy, indicating a cohesive theology whereby God in creative fruitfulness calls human beings to imitate the divine plenitude and life-giving creativity.

The Book of Genesis, particularly in its first chapter, presents God as creating the world and calling for the interior principle for bearing life from plants: "And God said, 'Let the earth put forth vegetation, plants yielding seed, and fruit trees bearing fruit in which is their seed, each according to its kind, upon the earth.'" The vegetation then responds to this divine initiative, which is recognized by God as good. A parallel act occurs with respect to animals, which are called to bear forth life "according to their kind." Finally, God creates the human being, and gives them the command: "Be fruitful and multiply," with a greater specification: "fill the earth and subdue it; and have dominion over the fish of the sea and over the birds of the air and over every living thing that moves upon the earth." This indicates that human beings, from the beginning, were called to flourish so as to bear fruit, which is not only biological offspring, but also a relation to the rest of creation.

Flourishing of the "just man". The imagery that compares the just or righteous person to a flourishing tree can be found in many places in the Hebrew Scriptures: Psalm 1:3, "He is like a tree planted by streams of water, that yields its fruit in its season, and its leaf does not wither." Psalm 92:12-14, "The righteous flourish like the palm tree, and grow like a cedar in Lebanon." Jeremiah 17:8, "Blessed is the man who trusts in the LORD, whose trust is the LORD. He is like a tree planted by water, that sends out its roots by the stream, and does not fear when heat comes, for its leaves remain green, and is not anxious in the year of drought, for it does not cease to bear fruit." See also, Isaiah 44:4.

Flourishing of the collective/people/city. At times, Israel is compared to a "vine" that has been planted by the hand of God. Ezekiel 19:10.

Hebrew Scripture also expounds on what could be called "anti-flourishing," that is, the counterpart to flourishing on account of righteousness and Torah meditation: "The wicked are not so, but are like chaff which the wind drives away." Also: Ps 35:5, Job 21:18. Here, too, a prophetic vision is combined with the image of the wicked who commit idolatry do not live and flourish, but instead are like dead bits of straw. This imagery is also utilized by John the Baptist to describe the eschatological work of the Messiah, who will judge the wicked and consign them to everlasting burning: "His winnowing fork is in his hand, and he will clear his threshing floor and gather his wheat into the granary, but the chaff he will burn with unquenchable fire."

=== New Testament ===
As befitted his traditional education and upbringing, Jesus Christ utilized Hebrew flourishing imagery a number of times. It may be inferred that his motivation for doing so was he found it suitable for his purposes, for he was reputed to be the son of a carpenter and therefore was not drawing upon immediate personal experience but a wider tradition.

In one place, he compares different ways of receiving "the word" and responding with different kinds of flourishing: some receive it with joy but like plants with a shallow root system fall away in difficult times; others are like "good soil" that "brought forth grain, some a hundredfold, some sixty, some thirty."

Jesus Christ also compares union with him to be the source of flourishing: "As the branch cannot bear fruit by itself, unless it abides in the vine, neither can you, unless you abide in me. I am the vine, you are the branches. He who abides in me, and I in him, he it is that bears much fruit." In contrast, the one who does not "abide" in him experiences "anti-flourishing": "If a man does not abide in me, he is cast forth as a branch and withers; and the branches are gathered, thrown into the fire and burned."

Christ stated that the fruit one bears is a sign of moral goodness, comparing people to trees as in his oft-quoted contention that "you will know them by their fruits."

It seems that, for Christ, bare life was insufficient for the developmental stage he expected people to reach, for he drew upon (anti-)flourishing imagery in a parable about a tree that does not bear fruit, and will be cut down within a year if it continues to be barren. This was manifested in a miracle in which Christ saw a fig tree "and found nothing on it but leaves only," and so cursed it, such that it "withered at once."

== Thomas Aquinas ==
=== Theological use ===
Thomas Aquinas, the Dominican Medieval theologian, uses "flourishing" language in metaphorical and analogical senses. For instance, he asserts that "as therefore we say that a tree flowers by its flower, so do we say that the Father, by the Word or the Son, speaks Himself, and His creatures; and that the Father and the Son love each other and us, by the Holy Ghost, or by Love proceeding;" he writes also that "Christ wished "to flower" by His holy life, not in His carnal birth." He says also that virtues "are also called "flowers," namely, in relation to future happiness; because just as from flowers hope of fruit is taken, so from works of the virtues is obtained hope of eternal life and happiness. And as in the flower there is a beginning of the fruit, so in the works of the virtues is a beginning of happiness, which will exist when knowledge and charity are made perfect." Commenting on Psalm 28 (27 according to the Vulgate), he uses the verb reflorere (to reflower) to the Resurrection of Christ, by applying to it the Vulgate 9th vers, in which it is said, in particular, that refloruit caro mea (lit.: my flesh reflowered).

=== Connection to felicitas (happiness) and beatitudo (beatitude) ===
In spite of this mainly metaphorical use of "flourishing" language, Aquinas deals widely with the notion nowadays expressed by "flourishing". The terms he employs in this context are felicitas (happiness) and beatitudo (beatitude, blessedness). In previous Christian Latin authors, as Boethius, felicitas was used to mean an earthly temporal good in opposition to beatitudo, the highest human good, attainable only in Heaven. Nevertheless, St. Thomas, probably influenced by Grosseteste's choice to translate Aristotle's eudaimonia in Latin as felicitas, and tended to use them as synonyms, though he more frequently used beatitudo, in order to mean the last end of human life, as it is explicit, for instance, in ST I-II, q. 2, a. 2, arg. 1; this end, for him, consists in the fruition or enjoyment of God, which is perfect only in Heaven. He identifies perfect beatitudo (perfect in relation to man, who is its subject, since fully perfect beatitude, according to Aquinas, belongs only to God, see, e.g., ST I-II, q. 3, a. 2, ad 4). There is also an imperfect beatitudo, which consists in the contemplation of God by natural reason is a participation of the perfect one and is attainable also in this life, and is the happiness of which Aristotle spoke. It is also relevant to note that, though identifying felicitas with natural contemplation of the divine, Aquinas acknowledges, following Aristotle, that some material goods are necessary aids for its attainment.

=== Full human flourishing not possible in this life due to sin ===
Felicitas, or imperfect beatitudo, is full human flourishing at the natural level and, as just seen, according to Aquinas, it is in principle attainable, since it is proportionate to human nature. In the state of innocence, humans were able to operate in their full powers and therefore to operate natural goods also without the help of divine grace, though the latter was already necessary to operate at the supernatural level and to reach perfect union with God. On the other hand, actual human nature is partially corrupted by the original sin, and, therefore, humans do not have the possibilities to fully use their natural powers and, therefore, they cannot fully flourish, not even on the natural level. Nevertheless, human nature is not totally corrupt; therefore, according to St. Thomas, it is still possible to naturally perform some good. Therefore, a full human natural flourishing, which requires the harmonious and excellent development of all moral virtues, is impossible by human natural forces in our current condition, and God's grace is necessary for full human flourishing.

=== Perfect human flourishing in next life through grace ===
Perfect human flourishing, according to Aquinas, consists in the direct contemplation of God and in loving Him, participating in His Trinitarian life. This highly exceeds human powers (as just seen, even in the state prior to sin); theological virtues, faith, hope, and charity, which are gratuitous gifts of God, are necessary to allow man to reach such an end, for which its powers are not proportionate. Also, the connection and full development of moral virtues, so full human flourishing in this life, require charity. Therefore, it is only a gratuitous gift of God which allows humans to know and love Him in a supernatural way already in this life. But a perfect knowledge and love of God, that is perfect beatitudo or perfect human flourishing is possible only in the next life by divine grace.

=== Flourishing as a habit and ongoing activity ===
According to Aquinas, habits, especially properly human habits, acquired through voluntary repeated actions, constitute a sort of second nature for us. Habits are extremely difficult to change, and, therefore, have an extremely significant part in shaping human behavior and in contributing or impeding true human flourishing. The possession of good habits, virtues, is an essential part of human flourishing. In order to flourish, one needs a habitual knowledge of both his/her condition and the final end he/she is pursuing, true happiness. But this is not sufficient, since knowledge of the good is not sufficient to cause our good acting. Human perfection also requires a continuous effort to attain deep changes on the personal level, cooperating with divine grace in destroying the old man, with his wrong habits, and in building up the new man, full of virtues (this is true also on the natural level of acquired virtues). In order to do that, a "readiness to change," or rather a "readiness to flourish," to take up any occasion to flourish, fighting against our bad habits and developing good ones, is needed to really flourish. An occasional readiness and a momentary intention is insufficient, for they could never attain stable results. What is needed is a stable readiness to flourish, that is a "habitual readiness," similar to the state of a healthy plant that is always ready to absorb necessary nutrients or grow or bear fruit when the conditions are right. A "flourishing habit" consists in a meta-habit that underlies all other habit development, as well as the ongoing activity of flourishing. It is a habitual readiness to develop habits as needed, and to continue the activity of flourishing within various contexts. In this way, a habitual readiness to flourish and the ongoing activity of flourishing can be considered as the moral correlates to a habitual intellectual attitude of openness to truth, one that keeps a person's mind open to learning in any realm that he encounters.

== Other religious interpretations ==
=== Daoism ===
According to Daoism, the most crucial characteristic which distinguishes human beings from other living beings is the ability to recognize, follow and identify with the dao, or tao, (Way) (D 23), a mysterious, and ineffable source that holds sway over all things. And this ability presupposes a capacity for self-cultivation, and, if necessary, self-transformation. Through self-cultivation a person is enabled to discharge a responsibility which is uniquely human: to help keep the world in good order. The Daoist conception of a flourishing life is enrooted in this vision of the human being: it is a virtuous life in which, through self-cultivation on the bodily, mental and spiritual sides, a person comes to identify with the dao, the mysterious source and sustainer of the cosmos. This brief and vague presentation should be acceptable by exponents of all Daoist schools. Nevertheless, there are huge differences among them about what precisely means to harmonize life with the dao and how to achieve it. For instance, in organized religious movements as the Ways of Great Clarity and of Complete Perfection, the attainment of immortality, based on the idea a person can emulate the eternal dao by never exhausting one's qi (vital energy), is particularly emphasized. Or in other later Daoist religious dispensations, like that of the Way of the Celestial Masters, the religious worship of a sage, seen as able to intercede with Heaven (in this example Laozi), is stressed. But in ancient Daoist philosophers these aspects are absent, or not so relevant. For them, a fundamental aspect of living in harmony with the dao is to live in harmony with nature. Moreover, Daoist de, usually translated as virtue, has not a moral dimension; in the case of human beings it indicates the qualities or dispositions that allow people to live a flourishing life. De is strictly related to ziran, another key Daoist concept usually translated as spontaneity or naturalness. In synthesis, to flourish is to live in harmony with the dao, that is to live spontaneously, so comply one's life with the nature of the dao.

== Positive psychology ==
=== History ===
"Flourishing" as a psychological concept has been developed by Corey Keyes and Barbara Fredrickson.

Keyes collaborated with Carol Ryff in testing her Six-factor Model of Psychological Well-being, and in 2002 published his theoretical considerations in an article on The Mental Health Continuum: From Languishing to Flourishing. qualified by Fredrickson as "path-breaking work that measures mental health in positive terms rather than by the absence of mental illness."

Barbara Fredrickson developed the broaden-and-build theory of positive emotions. According to Fredrickson there is a wide variety of positive effects that positive emotions and experiences have on human lives. Fredrickson notes two characteristics of positive emotions that differ from negative emotions:

1. Positive emotions do not seem to elicit specific action tendencies the same way that negative emotions do. Instead, they seem to cause some general, non-direction oriented activation.
2. Positive emotions do not necessarily facilitate physical action, but do spark significant cognitive action. For this reason, Fredrickson conceptualizes two new concepts: thought-action tendencies, or what a person normally does in a particular situation, and thought-action repertoires, rather an inventory of skills of what a person is able to do.

Previous theories of emotion stated that all emotions are associated with urges to act in particular ways, called action-tendencies. (Note: For instance, anger creates the urge to seek retribution or to attack, fear creates the urge to escape, guilt creates the urge to make amends for actions, etc. People do not necessarily act on these urges when they experience these particular emotions, but rather people's ideas about possible courses of action narrow to reflect these specific urges. These action-tendencies are not merely thoughts, but also manifest physiologically. For example, when someone is afraid, blood flow increases to major muscle groups and pupils dilate, preparing the body to flee. Emotions have adaptive value, such as mobilizing and preparing our minds and bodies during times of danger. The reflexive action-tendencies that are associated with emotions probably developed over the course of humankind's evolution.) According to Fredrickson, most positive emotions do not follow this model of action-tendencies, since they do not usually occur in life-threatening circumstances and thus do not generally elicit specific urges. Fredrickson proposes that instead of one general theory of emotions, psychologists should develop theories for each emotion or for subsets of emotions.

The broaden-and-build theory of positive emotions proposed by Fredrickson states that while negative emotions narrow thought-action tendencies to time tested strategies as handed down by evolution, positive emotions broaden thought-action repertoires. Positive emotions often cause people to discard time-tested or automatic action tendencies and pursue novel, creative, and often unscripted courses of thought and action. These positive emotions and thought-action repertoires can be seen as applicable to the concept of flourishing because flourishing children and adults have a much wider array of cognitive, physical, and social possibilities, which results in the empirical and actual successes of a flourishing life.

The concept has also been used by Martin E.P. Seligman in his 2011 publication Flourish. Seligman, usually considered the father of positive psychology, characterizes human flourishing as excellence in 5 fields: positive emotion, engagement, relationships, meaning, and achievement. Consequently, his model of human flourishing is usually called the PERMA model. He claims also that health is an essential element of flourishing, but he presents a quite vast notion of health, including biological assets (e.g., the hormone oxytocin, longer DNA telomeres), subjective assets (e.g., optimism, vitality), and functional assets (good marriage, rich friendships, engaging work) (See Seligman, Flourish, 209). Although Seligman's PERMA model is certainly useful for psychological studies on flourishing, it doesn't capture the essence of human flourishing, since it may allow us to consider as flourishing evidently evil people, as brutal dictators, if they test good in these five fields. To avoid this misunderstanding of human flourishing, Seligman himself, and also other thinkers as Christopher Peterson, have also discussed what they call "character strengths" or "virtues.".

=== Measurement and diagnostic criteria ===
With the concept of flourishing, psychologists can study and measure fulfillment, purpose, meaning, and happiness. Flourishing can be measured through self-report measures. Individuals are asked to respond to structured scales measuring the presence of positive affect, absence of negative affect, and perceived satisfaction with life. Participants are specifically asked about their emotions and feelings because scientists theorize that flourishing is something that manifests itself internally rather than externally.

==== Mental health continuum ====
Keyes has operationalized the definition of what it means to be flourishing by establishing diagnostic criteria, resulting in the development of the "Mental Health Continuum-Short Form" (MHC-SF) in 2002, which is derived from the original long form (MHC-LF). The MHC-SF consists of 14 items, the answers range from 0 ("never") to 5 ("every day"), measuring the frequency of experiences over the past four weeks:

1. Individual must have had no episodes of major depression in the past year
2. Individual must possess a high level of well-being as indicated by the individuals meeting all three of the following criteria
  1. High emotional well-being, defined by 2 of 3 scale scores on appropriate measures falling in the upper tertile.
    1. Positive affect
    2. Negative affect (low)
    3. Life satisfaction
  2. High psychological well-being, defined by 4 of 6 scale scores on appropriate measures falling in the upper tertile.
    1. Self-acceptance
    2. Personal growth
    3. Purpose in life
    4. Environmental mastery
    5. Autonomy
    6. Positive relations with others
  3. High social well-being, defined by 3 of 5 scale scores on appropriate measures falling in the upper tertile.
    1. Social acceptance
    2. Social actualization
    3. Social contribution
    4. Social coherence
    5. Social integration

==== Flourishing Scale ====
In 2009, Diener developed the Flourishing Scale, an 8-item summary measure of the respondent's self-perceived success in areas such as relationships, self-esteem, purpose, and optimism. Each item is rated on a 7-point Likert scale, with scores ranging from 1 ("strongly disagree") to 7 ("strongly agree").

==== PERMA-Profiler ====
In 2011, Seligman developed the PERMA-model, this model defines well-being in terms of five pillars: Positive emotion, Engagement, Relationships, Meaning, and Accomplishment (PERMA). In 2016, Butler and Kern developed the PERMA-profiler, to rate each of these five components. The profiler uses a set of 15 questions (three items per PERMA domain). In the second phase of research eight additional items were added, which assess overall wellbeing, negative emotion, loneliness, and physical health, resulting in a final 23-item measure. The answers range from 0 ("never") to 10 ("always").

=== Interventions to improve flourishing ===
Lyubomirsky, Sheldon, and Schkade identified three major factors influencing an individual's happiness level: a genetically determined set point for happiness, happiness-relevant circumstantial factors, and happiness-relevant activities and practices. Positive psychological interventions (PPIs) are the general term for a series of practical applications and activities designed to strengthen "positive resources". In a 2015 study of a PPI and its impact on flourishing, researchers observed a 5% to 28% increase in flourishing among participants who engaged in a guided self-help Acceptance and Commitment Therapy (ACT) program. In addition, the effects on flourishing were maintained at the three-month follow-up. In 2016, an intervention focused on acts of kindness was carried out. Participants were asked to engage in five acts of kindness on one day each week, either for others or for the world, over a six-week period. Results showed that prosocial behaviors led to significantly greater increases in psychological flourishing compared to self-focused or neutral behaviors.

=== Major empirical findings ===
Positive emotional feelings such as moods, and sentiments such as happiness, carry more personal and psychological benefits than just a pleasant, personal subjective experience. Flourishing widens attention, broaden behavioral repertoires, which means to broaden one's skills or regularly performed actions, increase intuition, and increase creativity. Secondly, good feelings can have physiological manifestations, such as significant and positive cardiovascular effects, such as a reduction in blood pressure. Third, good feelings predict healthy mental and physical outcomes. Also, positive affect and flourishing is related to longevity. In a 2022 study of intrusive thoughts and flourishing, Jesse Omoregie and Jerome Carson found that people who experience flourishing would usually experience minimal intrusive thoughts. Omoregie and Carson further concluded that flourishing is a variable that helps in the reduction of psychological problems such as anxiety, depression, and intrusive thoughts.

The many components of flourishing elicit more tangible outcomes than simply mental or physiological results. For example, components such as self-efficacy, likability, and prosocial behavior encourage active involvement with goal pursuits and with the environment. This promotes people to pursue and approach new and different situations. Therefore, flourishing adults have higher levels of motivation to work actively to pursue new goals and are in possession of more past skills and resources. This helps people to satisfy life and societal goals, such as creating opportunities, performing well in the workplace, and producing goods, work and careers that are highly valued in American society. Authors, Robert Kegan and Lisa Laskow Lahey, in their book, An Everyone Culture, "argues that organizations do best when they build an environment that encourages constant personal development among their employees." This success results in higher satisfaction and reinforces Frederickson's Broaden and Build model, for more positive adults reap more benefits and, are more positive, which creates an upward spiral.

Studies have shown that people who are flourishing are more likely to graduate from college, secure "better" jobs, and are more likely to succeed in that job. One reason for this success can be seen in the evidence offered above when discussing languishing: those that flourish have less work absenteeism, cited by Lyubomirsky as "job withdrawal." Finally, those that are flourishing have more support and assistance from coworkers and supervisors in their workplace.

Flourishing has been found to impact more areas than simply the workplace. In particular community involvement and social relationships have been cited as something that flourishing influences directly. For example, those that flourish have been found to volunteer at higher levels across cultures. Moreover, in terms of social support and relationships, studies have shown that there is an association between flourishing and actual number of friends, overall social support, and perceived companionship.

=== Applications ===
The definition or conceptualization of mental health under the framework of flourishing and languishing describes symptoms that can cooperate with intervention techniques aimed at increasing levels of emotional, social, and psychological well-being. Furthermore, as Keyes implies, in a world full of flourishing people, all would be able to reap the benefits that this positive mental state and life condition offers.

==== Education ====
Keyes mentions children as well as adults. He says that children are directly affected by maternal depression, and points out that the flourishing or languishing of teachers and the effect on students have not been studied. Keyes also speculates that teacher retention may be associated with the students' frames of mind. Furthermore, if students can be made to flourish, the benefits to the education process are greater, as flourishing can increase attention and thought-action repertoires.

==== Engagement ====
Flourishing also has many applications to civic duty and social engagement. Keyes believes that most people do not focus enough on those aspects of life and focus instead on personal achievement. Keyes suggests that people should provide encouragement to children, and adults, to participate socially. People that exhibit flourishing are engaged in social participation and people that are engaged in social participation exhibit flourishing. Therefore, he suggests that people should give their kids a purpose, which creates a sense of contribution and environmental mastery that enhances feelings of well-being and fulfilment.

=== Criticisms ===
This psychological concept of flourishing is built on Fredrickson's broaden-and-build theory of positive emotions, but some researchers have suggested that there are other functions of positive emotions. Mackie and Worth propose that positive emotions diminish cognitive capabilities. They showed that when exposed to a persuasive message for a limited amount of time, subjects experiencing a positive mood showed reduced processing as compared with subjects in a neutral mood. Others have suggested that positive emotions diminish the motivation but not the capacity for cognitive processing. Flourishing is still a newly developing subject of study and, more tests need to be done to fully define, operationalize, and apply the concept of flourishing; this lack of research is also one criticism of the concept of flourishing.

== Contemporary Flourishing Research ==
=== Global Flourishing Study ===
It is a longitudinal study about human flourishing, involving data collection of individuals of 22 countries all around the world. It is carried out by scholars at the Human Flourishing Program at Harvard and Baylor's Institute for Studies of Religion, in partnership with Gallup and the Center for Open Science. Its preparation began in 2018 and the first wave of results was published in April 2025.

=== Johns Hopkins: Paul McHugh Program for Human Flourishing ===
This program based at Johns Hopkins University, founded in 2015, and directed by Margaret S. Chisolm, aims at bringing the results of interdisciplinary research on health and human flourishing to an audience of both clinicians and clinicians-in-training.

=== Harvard Human Flourishing Program ===
This program was founded in 2016 at Harvard's Institute for Quantitative Social Science and directed by Tyler J. VanderWeele. Its aim is to study and promote human flourishing.

=== University of Pennsylvania: Positive Psychology Center and Flourishing and Humanities Project ===
This interdisciplinary research project, based at the University of Pennsylvania's Positive Psychology Center, directed by James Pawelski and founded in 2014, studies the relations of the arts and humanities with human flourishing.

=== Humanity 2.0 ===
The Humanity 2.0 Foundation mission is to identify impediments to human flourishing and then work collaboratively across sectors to remove them by sourcing and scaling bold and innovative solutions. To support this mission, the Humanity 2.0 Institute integrates global research on key questions: What is human flourishing? What are the pathways to achieve human flourishing? What obstacles block these pathways? What are practical solutions to remove these obstacles? Research partners include the Human Flourishing Program at Harvard University, the Pontifical Gregorian University and the University of Pennsylvania Positive Psychology Center and Flourishing Humanities Project.

== See also ==
- Circles of Sustainability
- Eudaimonia
- Ennui
- Negative affect
- Positive affect
- Well-being
