= Youth First Texas =

LGBTQ+ non-profit youth organization

Youth First Texas is a non-profit organization that provides programs and resources for LGBTQ+ youth empowerment and self-acceptance. It is located at Resource Center Dallas in Dallas, Texas. It is the only LGBTQ+ youth program in North Texas that addresses challenges faced at home, school, and in the community. Youth First Texas has served more than 1,200 teens since 1999. Their mission statement is, "Youth First Texas is the only non-profit organization in North Texas exclusively committed to providing social services, educational opportunities, and recreational activities for Gay, Lesbian, Bisexual, Transgender[ed] and Questioning youth through the age of 22." The goal of Youth First Texas is to empower youth with knowledge essential to making safe and informed decisions before and throughout adulthood. Youth First Texas provides educational, financial, and mental health resources to LGBTQ+ teenagers in North Texas, easing their entry into adulthood.

== History ==
After volunteering at LGBTQ+ youth camps in the 1990s, Bob Miskinis, Daryl Parker, Bob Ivancic, and Emilia Menthe recognized the need for an LGBTQ+ youth organization to support troubled LGBTQ+ youth. As a result, Youth First Texas was founded by Bob Miskinis, Daryl Parker, Bob Ivancic, and Emilia Menthe in November 1999. In 2001, Youth First Texas registered as a non-profit organization, and the first center was opened in Dallas, Texas. Following its opening, Youth First Texas relocated several times before settling an agreement to merge with Resource Center Dallas, a center that houses several LGTBQ+ programs, including Youth First Texas, in Dallas, Texas.

== Services ==
Youth First Texas provides social services, educational opportunities, and recreational activities. It is a space for LGBTQ+ youth to receive acceptance and support during their transition into adulthood. Recreational activities, such as dances, choirs, or movie nights, enable LGBTQ+ teens to connect. Youth can participate in leadership seminars or receive academic tutoring. Weekly Queer Identify Nights allow teens to receive mentorship from older LGBTQ+ adults. Furthermore, Youth First Texas provides Q Chat Space and Zoom "Queer Sex Ed", allowing for live online discussion between LGBTQ+ youth.

== Impact ==
According to Dallas Morning News, "a survey of 100 youths who visited Youth First Texas, or YFT, last year showed that more than half had tried to commit suicide, while about a quarter had been kicked out of their homes because of their sexual orientation." Youth First Texas serves as a resource for LGBTQ+ teens to turn to for a safe space and support, thus creating a community and encouraging one another to be productive contributors to society through the empowerment of life skills, peer support, and educational advancement.
