= Human flourishing =

Human flourishing may refer to:

- Eudaimonia, human flourishing in Ancient Greek philosophy
- Flourishing, a broader concept, belonging to both philosophy and positive psychology.
