= Perma =

Perma or PERMA may refer to:

- Perma (Benin), a town and arrondissement
- Perma, Montana, a place in Sanders County, Montana, United States
- PERMA model, a model of psychological well-being developed by Martin Seligman

== See also ==
- Perma.cc, a web archiving service for legal and academic citations
