= Six-factor model of psychological well-being =

Psychological theory

The six-factor model of psychological well-being is a theory developed by Carol Ryff that determines six factors that contribute to an individual's psychological well-being, contentment, and happiness. Psychological well-being consists of self-acceptance, positive relationships with others, autonomy, environmental mastery, a feeling of purpose and meaning in life, and personal growth and development. Psychological well-being is attained by achieving a state of balance affected by both challenging and rewarding life events.

== Measurement ==
The Ryff Scale of Measurement is a psychometric inventory consisting of two forms (either 54 or 84 items) in which respondents rate statements on a scale of 1 to 6, where 1 indicates strong disagreement and 6 indicates strong agreement. Ryff's model is not based on merely feeling happy, but is based on Aristotle's Nicomachean Ethics, "where the goal of life isn't feeling good, but is instead about living virtuously".

The Ryff Scale is based on six factors: autonomy, environmental mastery, personal growth, positive relations with others, purpose in life, and self-acceptance. Higher total scores indicate higher psychological well-being. Following are explanations of each criterion, and an example statement from the Ryff Inventory to measure each criterion.

1. Autonomy: High scores indicate that the respondent is independent and regulates his or her behavior independent of social pressures. An example statement for this criterion is "I have confidence in my opinions, even if they are contrary to the general consensus".
2. Environmental Mastery: High scores indicate that the respondent makes effective use of opportunities and has a sense of mastery in managing environmental factors and activities, including managing everyday affairs and creating situations to benefit personal needs. An example statement for this criterion is "In general, I feel I am in charge of the situation in which I live".
3. Personal Growth: High scores indicate that the respondent continues to develop, is welcoming to new experiences, and recognizes improvement in behavior and self over time. An example statement for this criterion is "I think it is important to have new experiences that challenge how you think about yourself and the world".
4. Positive Relations with Others: High scores reflect the respondent's engagement in meaningful relationships with others that include reciprocal empathy, intimacy, and affection. An example statement for this criterion is "People would describe me as a giving person, willing to share my time with others".
5. Purpose in Life: High scores reflect the respondent's strong goal orientation and conviction that life holds meaning. An example statement for this criterion is "Some people wander aimlessly through life, but I am not one of them".
6. Self-Acceptance: High scores reflect the respondent's positive attitude about his or her self. An example statement for this criterion is "I like most aspects of my personality".

== Applications and research-findings ==
=== Contributing factors ===
==== Positive contributing factors ====
Positive psychological well-being may emerge from numerous sources. A happy marriage is contributive, for example, as is a satisfying job or a meaningful relationship with another person. When marriages include forgiveness, optimistic expectations, positive thoughts about one's spouse, and kindness, a marriage significantly improves psychological well-being. A propensity to unrealistic optimism and over-exaggerated self-evaluations can be useful. These positive illusions are especially important when an individual receives threatening negative feedback, as the illusions allow for adaptation in these circumstances to protect psychological well-being and self-confidence (Taylor & Brown, 1988). Optimism also can help an individual cope with stresses to their well-being.

==== Negative contributing factors ====
Psychological well-being can also be affected negatively, as is the case with a degrading and unrewarding work environment, unfulfilling obligations and unsatisfying relationships. Social interaction has a strong effect on well-being as negative social outcomes are more strongly related to well-being than are positive social outcomes. Childhood traumatic experiences diminish psychological well-being throughout adult life, and can damage psychological resilience in children, adolescents, and adults. Perceived stigma also diminished psychological well-being, particularly stigma in relation to obesity and other physical ailments or disabilities.

=== Extrinsic and intrinsic psychological needs ===
A study conducted in the early 1990s exploring the relationship between well-being and those aspects of positive functioning that were put forth in Ryff's model indicates that persons who aspired more for financial success relative to affiliation with others or their community scored lower on various measures of well-being.

Individuals that strive for a life defined by affiliation, intimacy, and contributing to one's community can be described as aspiring to fulfil their intrinsic psychological needs. In contrast, those individuals who aspire for wealth and material, social recognition, fame, image, or attractiveness can be described as aiming to fulfil their extrinsic psychological needs. The strength of an individual's intrinsic (relative to extrinsic) aspirations as indicated by rankings of importance correlates with an array of psychological outcomes. Positive correlations have been found with indications of psychological well-being: positive affect, vitality, and self-actualization. Negative correlations have been found with indicators of psychological ill-being: negative affect, depression, and anxiety.

=== Relations with others ===
A more recent study confirming Ryff's notion of maintaining positive relations with others as a way of leading a meaningful life involved comparing levels of self-reported life satisfaction and subjective well-being (positive/negative affect). Results suggested that individuals whose actions had underlying eudaimonic tendencies as indicated by their self-reports (e.g., "I seek out situations that challenge my skills and abilities") were found to possess higher subjective well-being and life satisfaction scores compared to participants who did not. Individuals were grouped according to their chosen paths/strategies to happiness as identified by their answers on an Orientation to Happiness Questionnaire. The questionnaire describes and differentiates individuals on the basis of three orientations to happiness which can be pursued, though some individuals do not pursue any. The "pleasure" orientation describes a path to happiness that is associated with adopting hedonistic life goals to satisfy only one's extrinsic needs. Engagement and meaning orientations describe a pursuit of happiness that integrates two positive psychology constructs "flow/engagement" and "eudaimonia/meaning". Both of the latter orientations are also associated with aspiring to meet intrinsic needs for affiliation and community and were amalgamated by Anić and Tončić into a single "eudaimonic" path to happiness that elicited high scores on all measures of well-being and life satisfaction. Importantly, she also produced scales for assessing mental health. This factor structure has been debated, but has generated much research in wellbeing, health, and successful aging.

=== Personality ===
Meta-analytic research shows that psychological well-being scales correlate strongly with all of the Big Five personality traits. Neuroticism is the strongest Big Five predictor of psychological well-being, correlating negatively with psychological well-being. In particular, openness has strong connections with personal growth, agreeableness and extraversion are notably related to positive relations, and conscientiousness is notably related to environmental mastery and purpose in life.

=== Heritability ===
Individual differences in both overall Eudaimonia, identified loosely with self-control and in the facets of eudaimonia are heritable. Evidence from one study supports 5 independent genetic mechanisms underlying the Ryff facets of this trait, leading to a genetic construct of eudaimonia in terms of general self-control, and four subsidiary biological mechanisms enabling the psychological capabilities of purpose, agency, growth, and positive social relations.

=== Well-being therapy ===
A therapy based on Ryff's six elements was developed by Fava and others.

== See also ==
- Flourishing
- Subjective vitality
