= Corey Keyes =

American sociologist and psychologist

- Education: University of Wisconsin-Eau Claire; University of Wisconsin-Madison
- Occupations: Professor, Sociologist
- Website: hip.emory.edu/faculty/bios/keyes_corey.html

Corey Keyes is an American sociologist. He is known for his work with positive psychology. Keyes currently teaches at Emory University in Georgia.

== Work ==
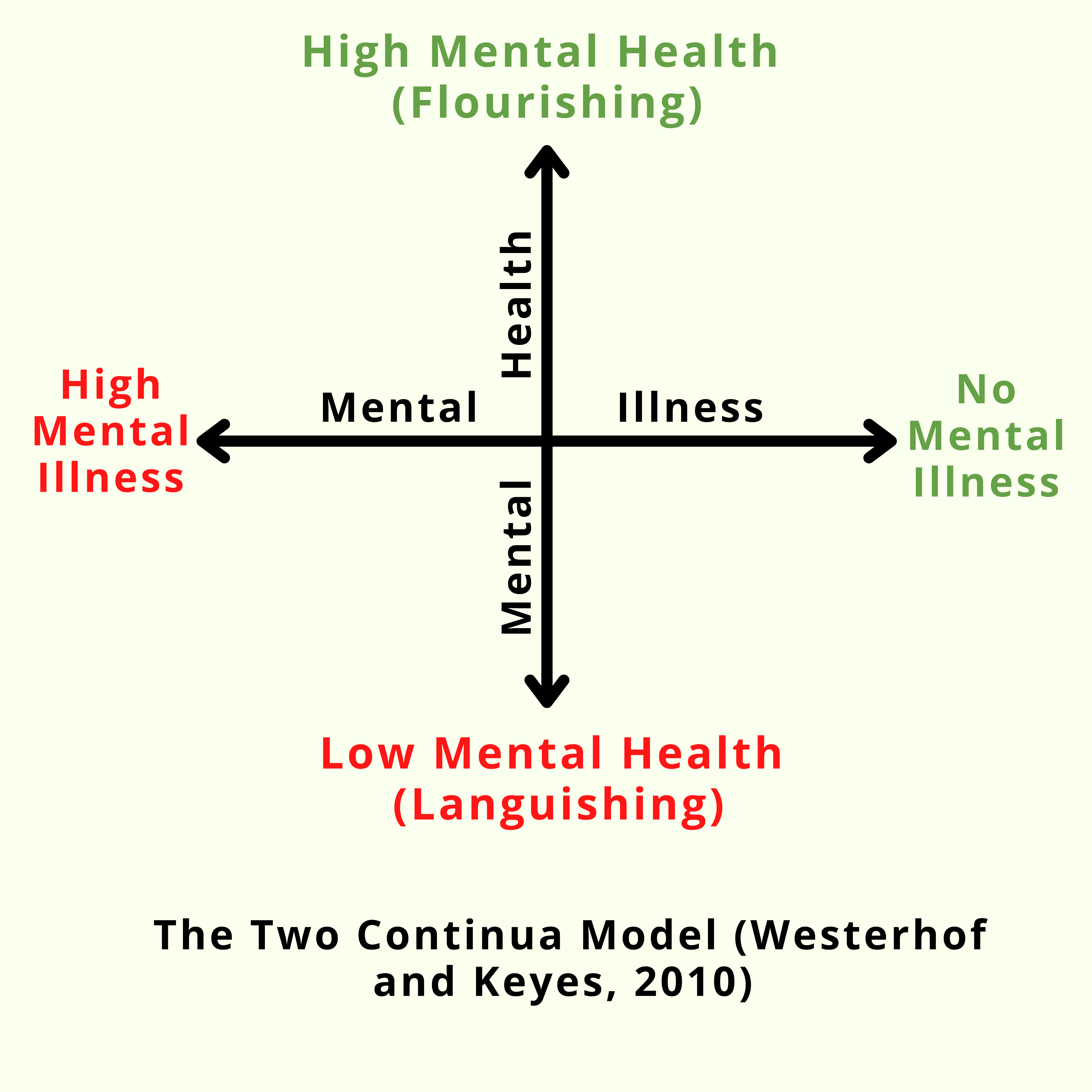
The Two Continua Model of Mental Health and Mental Illness

Keyes works in the areas of complete mental health and methods for attaining positive social relationships. He also studies the psychology of aging. Keyes is known for coining the psychological terms flourishing and languishing, which describe a person's level of mental health, and has published widely in this field. He is considered a pioneer in the field of positive psychology. Keyes is a member of an advisory board for the World Happiness Forum and a member of the Positive Psychology Network. His work has had wide-reaching policy implications. He has worked with the Centers for Disease Control and Prevention and his model of mental health as a complete state has been used by the Public Health Agency of Canada in a national surveillance program.

== Quotes ==
- We are living longer — on average 30 years longer than at the start of the 20th century — yet we are not living healthier. The question is: Are we just living dependent and sick, or are we living healthy and able to contribute?
- I think we set up an impossible task, because our hedonistic version of happiness is impossible to sustain. But it is quite possible to feel fulfilled and content and that the world is meaningful by aligning yourself with some ideals, something that is bigger and better than you, and trying to live up to it.

== Books ==
- Languishing: How to Feel Alive Again in a World That Wears Us Down. 2024, Corey Keyes, Crown, 978–0593444627
- Women and Depression: A Handbook for the Social, Behavioral, and Biomedical Sciences. 2006, Corey L. M. Keyes (Editor), Sherryl H. Goodman (Editor) CUP, 978–0521831574
- Keyes, CLM and Haidt, J (Editors). (2003). Flourishing: positive psychology and the life well-lived. American Psychological Association, Washington, DC.
- Risk and Resilience in Human Development
- Social Functioning and Social Well-Being

== Education ==
- B.A. University of Wisconsin-Eau Claire
- M.S. University of Wisconsin-Madison
- Ph.D. University of Wisconsin-Madison
