= PERMA model =

Psychology framework

PERMA is a model of psychological well-being developed by Martin Seligman. The mnemonic acronym stands for the five core elements of well-being that Seligman distinguishes: Positive Emotion, Engagement, Relationships, Meaning, and Accomplishment. The model was introduced in Seligman's book Flourish (2011), and is now widely used in positive psychology interventions, organizational psychology, and development programs.

== Definition and context ==
According to Seligman, for an element to be considered part of a well-being theory, it must possess three essential properties: it must contribute to well-being, be pursued by many people for its own sake rather than merely as a means to obtain other elements, and be defined and measured independently of the other elements, ensuring its exclusivity. Based on these criteria, Seligman developed the PERMA model, which consists of five elements:

- Positive emotions include a wide range of feelings, not just happiness and joy. Included are emotions like excitement, satisfaction, pride and awe, amongst others. These emotions are frequently seen as connected to positive outcomes, such as longer life and healthier social relationships.
- Engagement refers to involvement in activities that draws and builds upon one's interests. Mihaly Csikszentmihalyi explains true engagement as flow, a feeling of intensity that leads to a sense of ecstasy and clarity. The task being done needs to call upon higher skill and be a bit difficult and challenging yet still possible. Engagement involves passion for and concentration on the task at hand and is assessed subjectively as to whether the person engaged was completely absorbed, losing self-consciousness.
- Relationships are all important in fueling positive emotions, whether they are work-related, familial, romantic, or platonic. As Christopher Peterson puts it simply, "Other people matter." Humans receive, share, and spread positivity to others through relationships. They are important not only in bad times, but good times as well. In fact, relationships can be strengthened by reacting to one another positively. It is typical that most positive things take place in the presence of other people.
- Meaning is also known as purpose, and prompts the question of "why". Discovering and figuring out a clear "why" puts everything into context from work to relationships to other parts of life. Finding meaning is learning that there is something greater than one's self. Despite potential challenges, working with meaning drives people to continue striving for a desirable goal.
- Accomplishments are the pursuit of success and mastery. Unlike the other parts of PERMA, they are sometimes pursued even when accomplishments do not result in positive emotions, meaning, or relationships. That being noted, accomplishments can activate the other elements of PERMA, such as pride, under positive emotion. Accomplishments can be individual or community-based, fun- or work-based.

== Measurement ==
Julie Butler and Margaret Kern created the PERMA-Profiler as a measure of the PERMA model. The profiler uses a set of 15 questions (three items per PERMA domain). In the second phase of research eight additional items were added, which assess overall well-being, negative emotion, loneliness, and physical health, resulting in a final 23-item measure. The answers range from 0 ("never") to 10 ("always").
