= Self-acceptance =

Self-acceptance is acceptance of self.

== Definition ==
Self-acceptance can be defined as:

- the awareness of one's strengths and weaknesses,
- the realistic (yet subjective) appraisal of one's talents, capabilities, and general worth, and,
- feelings of satisfaction with one's self despite deficiencies and regardless of past behaviors and choices.

According to Shepard, self-acceptance is an individual's satisfaction or happiness with oneself, and is thought to be necessary for good mental health. Self-acceptance involves self-understanding, a realistic, albeit subjective, awareness of one's strengths and weaknesses. It results in an individual's feeling about oneself, that they are of "unique worth".

Albert Ellis advocated the importance of accepting oneself just because one is alive, human and unique—and not giving oneself a global rating, or being influenced by what others think.

In clinical psychology and positive psychology, self-acceptance is considered the prerequisite for change to occur. It can be achieved by stopping criticizing and solving the defects of one's self, and then accepting them to be existing within one's self. That is, tolerating oneself to be imperfect in some parts.

Some distinguish between conditional and unconditional self-acceptance.

Self-acceptance is one of the six factors in Carol D. Ryff's structure for eudaimonic well-being.

== Qualities ==
A person who scores high on self-acceptance:

- has a positive self-attitude,
- acknowledges and accepts all aspects of themselves (including the good and bad),
- is not self-critical or confused about their identity.
- does not wish they were any different from who they already are.

== Past and current views in psychology ==
In the past, the practice of self-acceptance was reproved by the Greeks. However, the need to know about and understand "the self" eventually became an important, underlying point in several psychological theories, such as:

- Jahoda's work on mental health,
- Carl Rogers' Theory of Personality,
- Gordon Allport's Eight Stages of Self (Proprium) Development,
- Maslow's Hierarchy of Needs under the "self-actualization" category,
- Albert Ellis' Rational emotive behavioral therapy

In addition to that, the life-span theories of Erikson and Neugarten mention the importance of self-acceptance including one's past life, and Carl Jung's process of individuation also emphasizes coming to terms with the dark side of one's self, or "the shadow".

== Relation to positive psychology ==
With respect to positive psychology, self-acceptance, as a component of eudaimonic well-being (EWB), is an indicator and a measure of psychological well-being. For instance, Alfred Adler, founder of individual psychology, observed that people who thought of themselves as inferior also observed a depreciation of others.

== Psychological benefits ==
Some psychological benefits of self-acceptance include mood regulation, a decrease in depressive symptoms, and an increase in positive emotions. An example of this can be seen in a 2014 study that looked at affective profiles. The results yielded suggest that individuals categorized as self-fulfilling (as compared to the other profiles) tended to score higher on all the factors of Ryff's eudaimonic well-being dimensions (self-acceptance included). In addition to that, self-acceptance (and environmental mastery) specifically and significantly predicted harmony in life across all affective profiles.

Other psychological benefits include:

- a heightened sense of freedom,
- a decrease in fear of failure,
- an increase in self-worth,
- an increase in independence (autonomy),
- an increase in self-esteem,
- less desire to win the approval of others,
- less self-critique and more self-kindness when mistakes occur,
- more desire to live life for one's self (and not others), and,
- the ability to take more risks without worrying about the consequences.

Self-acceptance is also thought to be necessary for good mental health.

== Physical benefits ==
In addition to psychological benefits, self-acceptance may have physical benefits as well. For example, the results of a 2008 study propose that older women with higher levels of environmental mastery, positive relations with others, and self-acceptance showed lower levels of glycosylated hemoglobin, which is a marker for glucose levels/insulin resistance.

== See also ==
- Self-compassion
- Self-esteem
- Self-love
- Unconditional positive regard
