= Carol Ryff =

American psychologist (born 1950)

- Born: Carol Diane Ryff
- Education: Pennsylvania State University
- Known for: Research on psychological well-being
- Spouse: Jack S. Dennis
- Scientific career
- Fields: Psychology
- Workplaces: University of Wisconsin-Madison
- Thesis: Towards a salient behavior-change construct in adult development and aging: the implementation-culmination sequence (1978)

Carol Diane Ryff is an American academic and psychologist. She received her doctorate in 1978. She is known for studying psychological well-being and psychological resilience. Ryff is the Hilldale Professor of psychology at the University of Wisconsin-Madison, where she directs the Institute on Aging. Ryff developed the six-factor model of psychological well-being.
