= World Happiness Report =

Publication ranking national happiness based on respondent ratings of their lives

World Happiness Index 2026 7–7.999 6–6.999 5–5.999 4–4.999 3–3.999 2–2.999 1–1.999

The World Happiness Report is a publication that contains articles and rankings of national happiness, based on respondent ratings of their own lives, which the report also correlates with various quality of life factors.

Since 2024, the report has been published by the Wellbeing Research Centre at the University of Oxford, in partnership with Gallup, the UN Sustainable Development Solutions Network, and an independent editorial board. The editorial board consists of the three founding editors, John F. Helliwell, Richard Layard, and Jeffrey D. Sachs, along with Jan-Emmanuel De Neve, Lara Aknin, and Shun Wang.

The report primarily uses data from the Gallup World Poll. The rankings are based on a single life evaluation question, the Cantril Ladder, in which respondents rate their current lives on a scale from 0 to 10. As of March 2026, Finland has been ranked the happiest country in the world for nine years in a row.

== History ==
In July 2011, the United Nations General Assembly adopted resolution 65/309, also named as Happiness: Towards a Holistic Definition of Development, inviting member countries to measure the happiness of their people and to use the data to help guide public policy.

The first World Happiness Report was released on 1 April 2012, as a foundational text for the UN High Level Meeting: Well-being and Happiness: Defining a New Economic Paradigm, drawing international attention. On 2 April 2012, this was followed by the first UN High Level Meeting called Wellbeing and Happiness: Defining a New Economic Paradigm, which was chaired by UN Secretary General Ban Ki-moon, in addition to that prime minister Jigme Thinley of Bhutan, a nation that adopted gross national happiness instead of gross domestic product as their main development indicator.

The first report outlined the state of world happiness, causes of happiness and misery, and policy implications highlighted by case studies. In 2013, the second World Happiness Report was issued, and in 2015 the third. Since 2016, it has been issued on an annual basis on 20 March, to coincide with the UN's International Day of Happiness.

== Methods and philosophy ==
The rankings of national happiness are based on a happiness measurement survey undertaken world-wide by the polling company Gallup, Inc. Nationally representative samples of respondents are asked to think of a ladder, with the best possible life for them being a 10, and the worst possible life being a 0. They are then asked to rate their own current lives on that 0 to 10 scale. The report correlates the life evaluation results with various life factors.

Researchers use the reports' life factor variables to explain national-level differences in life evaluation. However, some variables, such as unemployment or inequality, are not considered. That is because comparable data are not yet available across all countries. The reports' variables only show correlation, not causation (see Correlation does not imply causation).

The report measures subjective well-being using the "Cantril ladder" to reflect people's own views, rather than external judgments. The goal is to free respondents to evaluate their own well-being.

The report shows how experts use well-being ratings to assess national progress. The experts are from fields including economics, psychology, survey analysis, and national statistics. Each report is organized by chapters that focus on issues relating to happiness. This includes mental illness, the objective benefits of happiness, the importance of ethics, policy implications, and links with the Organization for Economic Co-operation and Development's (OECD) approach to measuring subjective well-being and other international and national efforts.

=== WELLBYs ===
From 2021, the World Happiness Report has supported using WELLBYs (Well-Being-Adjusted Life-Years). It says that QALYs (Quality-Adjusted Life Years) only count a patient's health quality. Instead, WELLBYs should be used. The report says policy-makers should aim to increase the WELLBYs of people alive today and future generations.

== International rankings ==
Data is collected from people in over 150 countries. Each variable measured reveals a populated-weighted average score on a scale running from 0 to 10 that is tracked over time and compared against other countries. These variables currently include:

- life evaluation – subjective rating of overall happiness, rated by each person surveyed on a scale of 0–10. This is the only number considered in each individual country's overall ranking
- real GDP per capita
- social support
- healthy life expectancy
- freedom to make life choices
- generosity
- perceptions of corruption

Each country is also compared against a hypothetical nation called Dystopia. Dystopia represents the lowest national averages for each key variable and is, along with residual error, used as a regression benchmark. The six metrics are used to explain the estimated extent to which each of these factors contribute to increasing life satisfaction when compared to the hypothetical nation of Dystopia, but they themselves do not have an effect on the total score reported for each country.

=== 2026 report ===
The 2026 report features the happiness score averaged over the years 2023–2025.

Rank	Country or region	Life evaluation	GDP per capita	Social support	Healthy life expectancy	Freedom to make life choices	Generosity	Perceptions of corruption	Residual
1	Finland	7.764	1.915	1.638	0.939	1.105	0.093	0.491	1.582
2	Iceland	7.540	1.971	1.720	0.996	1.105	0.187	0.187	1.373
3	Denmark	7.539	1.986	1.633	0.930	1.081	0.125	0.474	1.310
4	Costa Rica	7.439	1.697	1.483	0.739	1.101	0.059	0.122	2.236
5	Sweden	7.255	1.950	1.570	1.027	1.070	0.149	0.447	1.041
6	Norway	7.242	2.057	1.626	0.983	1.092	0.157	0.413	0.913
7	Netherlands	7.223	1.983	1.539	0.922	1.000	0.175	0.349	1.255
8	Israel	7.187	1.867	1.606	0.925	0.863	0.139	0.196	1.592
9	Luxembourg	7.063	2.162	1.465	0.981	1.056	0.111	0.382	0.907
10	Switzerland	7.018	2.028	1.534	1.017	1.035	0.148	0.452	0.804
11	New Zealand	6.995	1.876	1.580	0.924	1.034	0.155	0.422	1.003
12	Mexico	6.972	1.636	1.366	0.631	1.015	0.056	0.128	2.141
13	Ireland	6.928	2.146	1.558	0.936	1.032	0.172	0.364	0.720
14	Belgium	6.926	1.951	1.520	0.988	0.990	0.107	0.296	1.074
15	Australia	6.916	1.937	1.497	0.956	0.989	0.159	0.294	1.085
16	Kosovo	6.910	1.535	1.293	0.907	1.045	0.186	0.082	1.860
17	Germany	6.882	1.948	1.490	0.876	0.948	0.145	0.349	1.128
18	Slovenia	6.868	1.872	1.594	0.913	1.097	0.108	0.108	1.177
19	Austria	6.845	1.954	1.474	0.926	0.979	0.171	0.285	1.057
20	Czechia	6.821	1.869	1.594	0.720	1.045	0.106	0.081	1.405
21	United Arab Emirates	6.821	1.980	1.096	0.710	1.071	0.149	0.228	1.587
22	Saudi Arabia	6.817	1.949	1.412	0.831	1.042	0.096	0.196	1.291
23	United States	6.816	2.002	1.516	0.678	0.776	0.155	0.155	1.534
24	Poland	6.768	1.851	1.479	0.693	0.945	0.023	0.177	1.600
25	Canada	6.741	1.917	1.525	0.955	0.948	0.153	0.321	0.923
26	Taiwan	6.714	1.959	1.446	0.933	0.879	0.107	0.179	1.211
27	Belize	6.711	1.471	1.420	0.609	1.146	0.070	0.080	1.913
28	Lithuania	6.704	1.863	1.555	0.653	0.891	0.049	0.113	1.579
29	United Kingdom	6.694	1.896	1.458	0.888	0.962	0.191	0.291	1.008
30	Serbia	6.691	1.696	1.543	0.580	0.913	0.124	0.096	1.740
31	Uruguay	6.635	1.748	1.540	0.525	1.054	0.070	0.194	1.505
32	Brazil	6.634	1.602	1.396	0.508	0.964	0.081	0.122	1.960
33	Kazakhstan	6.633	1.782	1.599	0.552	0.982	0.117	0.104	1.496
34	Romania	6.629	1.818	1.233	0.608	0.965	0.030	0.034	1.941
35	France	6.586	1.907	1.435	0.950	0.830	0.090	0.240	1.133
36	Singapore	6.585	2.167	1.471	1.059	0.980	0.145	0.512	0.252
37	El Salvador	6.578	1.448	1.086	0.633	1.089	0.047	0.289	1.987
38	Italy	6.574	1.899	1.405	0.975	0.746	0.075	0.067	1.407
39	Panama	6.547	1.787	1.479	0.818	0.975	0.039	0.042	1.407
40	Kuwait	6.543	1.862	1.316	0.880	1.031	0.110	0.167	1.177
41	Spain	6.540	1.871	1.552	1.036	0.857	0.112	0.167	0.946
42	Guatemala	6.533	1.472	1.175	0.380	1.034	0.076	0.094	2.304
43	Malta	6.436	1.942	1.532	0.948	0.977	0.183	0.120	0.735
44	Argentina	6.430	1.700	1.517	0.621	0.970	0.052	0.076	1.493
45	Vietnam	6.428	1.510	1.375	0.698	1.147	0.039	0.207	1.453
46	Estonia	6.410	1.824	1.604	0.692	0.990	0.105	0.353	0.842
47	Bosnia and Herzegovina	6.381	1.616	1.425	0.678	0.874	0.152	0.024	1.612
48	Latvia	6.365	1.797	1.610	0.512	0.940	0.103	0.097	1.305
49	Jamaica	6.305	1.445	1.554	0.371	0.966	0.059	0.082	1.827
50	Chile	6.302	1.730	1.427	0.792	0.926	0.087	0.087	1.254
51	Nicaragua	6.301	1.320	1.349	0.740	1.030	0.097	0.278	1.487
52	Thailand	6.296	1.632	1.424	0.694	1.087	0.195	0.029	1.234
53	Uzbekistan	6.283	1.415	1.527	0.771	1.085	0.173	0.196	1.116
54	Slovakia	6.255	1.815	1.630	0.564	0.847	0.056	0.065	1.278
55	Bahrain	6.254	1.930	1.293	0.693	1.055	0.143	0.171	0.969
56	Philippines	6.206	1.413	1.285	0.286	1.085	0.088	0.095	1.953
57	Paraguay	6.198	1.547	1.529	0.209	1.039	0.097	0.058	1.719
58	Oman	6.197	1.789	1.286	0.580	1.057	0.132	0.188	1.164
59	Ecuador	6.144	1.505	1.168	0.835	0.860	0.058	0.085	1.634
60	Montenegro	6.139	1.709	1.485	0.680	0.935	0.073	0.142	1.115
61	Japan	6.130	1.858	1.414	1.041	0.875	0.019	0.202	0.722
62	Cyprus	6.126	1.892	1.215	0.953	0.794	0.086	0.070	1.116
63	Honduras	6.096	1.277	1.083	0.466	0.999	0.122	0.081	2.067
64	Dominican Republic	6.093	1.664	1.406	0.702	1.015	0.061	0.188	1.057
65	China	6.074	1.662	0.963	0.905	0.793	0.089	0.161	1.502
66	Kyrgyzstan	6.049	1.296	1.565	0.759	1.108	0.142	0.102	1.077
67	South Korea	6.040	1.906	1.230	1.028	0.825	0.089	0.149	0.812
68	Colombia	6.040	1.586	1.374	0.630	0.915	0.042	0.051	1.441
69	Portugal	6.029	1.830	1.461	0.944	1.005	0.035	0.031	0.724
70	Croatia	6.009	1.834	1.562	0.737	0.675	0.022	0.095	1.084
71	Malaysia	6.005	1.766	1.170	0.413	1.109	0.161	0.112	1.275
72	Peru	5.974	1.535	1.240	0.605	0.849	0.055	0.010	1.680
73	Mauritius	5.939	1.707	1.384	0.704	0.926	0.092	0.127	0.999
74	Hungary	5.937	1.819	1.625	0.633	0.785	0.103	0.056	0.916
75	Mongolia	5.936	1.558	1.615	0.421	0.752	0.162	0.051	1.376
76	Trinidad and Tobago	5.905	1.748	1.413	0.490	0.884	0.109	0.000	1.262
77	Moldova	5.851	1.550	1.277	0.409	0.981	0.053	0.037	1.544
78	Bolivia	5.835	1.442	1.200	0.360	0.909	0.059	0.038	1.827
79	Russia	5.834	1.821	1.331	0.505	0.809	0.112	0.133	1.122
80	Venezuela	5.756	0.000	1.335	0.561	0.846	0.180	0.133	2.701
81	Libya	5.731	1.480	1.136	0.619	0.865	0.099	0.245	1.286
82	North Macedonia	5.719	1.665	1.448	0.581	0.740	0.124	0.013	1.149
83	Algeria	5.714	1.535	1.275	0.964	0.933	0.057	0.113	0.837
84	Bulgaria	5.703	1.768	1.587	0.470	0.881	0.059	0.003	0.935
85	Greece	5.697	1.795	1.257	0.799	0.478	0.023	0.064	1.282
86	Albania	5.662	1.631	1.026	0.782	1.014	0.106	0.060	1.043
87	Indonesia	5.617	1.512	1.229	0.485	1.043	0.295	0.033	1.020
88	Tajikistan	5.591	1.180	1.476	0.783		0.085	0.336	
89	Armenia	5.584	1.608	1.225	1.050	0.914	0.026	0.152	0.608
90	Hong Kong	5.569	1.960	1.330	1.238	0.852	0.090	0.395	-0.295
91	Georgia	5.517	1.669	1.201	0.500	0.988	0.000	0.161	0.998
92	Laos	5.515	1.357	0.866	0.554	1.065	0.134	0.174	1.366
93	Mozambique	5.336	0.839	1.018	0.126	0.888	0.116	0.165	2.182
94	Turkey	5.300	1.785	1.313	0.692	0.363	0.046	0.099	1.002
95	Iraq	5.212	1.477	1.127	0.704	0.615	0.087	0.084	1.117
96	Gabon	5.167	1.591	1.003	0.450	0.829	0.043	0.092	1.159
97	Iran	5.151	1.565	1.249	0.693	0.599	0.189	0.124	0.733
98	Ivory Coast	5.148	1.285	0.694	0.450	0.840	0.100	0.176	1.604
99	Nepal	5.147	1.200	1.099	0.508	0.887	0.117	0.075	1.260
100	Cameroon	5.083	1.191	0.900	0.348	0.821	0.094	0.055	1.675
101	South Africa	5.009	1.494	1.285	0.101	0.825	0.064	0.064	1.176
102	Azerbaijan	4.993	1.636	0.979	0.847	0.935	0.058	0.198	0.340
103	Niger	4.940	0.890	0.651	0.300	0.900	0.121	0.115	1.964
104	Pakistan	4.868	1.224	0.556	0.489	0.564	0.144	0.071	1.819
105	Tunisia	4.798	1.475	1.043	0.442	0.652	0.038	0.071	1.078
106	Nigeria	4.788	1.335	1.083	0.462	0.735	0.151	0.036	0.986
107	Senegal	4.787	1.164	0.882	0.480	0.922	0.114	0.113	1.111
108	Namibia	4.781	1.410	1.411	0.038	0.670	0.048	0.058	1.145
109	Palestine	4.694	1.242	1.335		0.742	0.073	0.095	
110	Kenya	4.674	1.242	0.879	0.518	0.798	0.207	0.093	0.936
111	Ukraine	4.658	1.547	1.303	0.498	0.722	0.222	0.008	0.358
112	Morocco	4.646	1.376	0.401	0.674	0.844	0.035	0.086	1.229
113	Guinea	4.609	1.132	0.622	0.364	0.866	0.141	0.102	1.381
114	Mali	4.588	1.036	0.779	0.381	0.904	0.078	0.105	1.305
115	Ghana	4.554	1.297	0.961	0.507	0.932	0.123	0.035	0.699
116	India	4.536	1.397	0.732	0.298	1.015	0.121	0.124	0.848
117	Somalia	4.508	0.818	0.791	0.035	0.928	0.155	0.218	1.562
118	Uganda	4.491	1.032	1.181	0.449	0.924	0.140	0.043	0.722
119	Jordan	4.478	1.388	1.055	0.606	0.853	0.053	0.174	0.348
120	Mauritania	4.473	1.272	0.787	0.593	0.593	0.109	0.188	0.931
121	Cambodia	4.462	1.295	1.075	0.531	1.123	0.148	0.088	0.201
122	Congo	4.456	1.259	0.554	0.391	0.751	0.074	0.123	1.304
123	Burkina Faso	4.455	0.995	0.630	0.343	0.820	0.135	0.253	1.280
124	Benin	4.393	1.122	0.087	0.409	0.816	0.086	0.243	1.630
125	Chad	4.385	0.979	0.676	0.292	0.571	0.151	0.116	1.600
126	Lesotho	4.375	1.007	1.135	0.000	0.741	0.057	0.069	1.365
127	Bangladesh	4.319	1.353	0.245	0.672	1.078	0.111	0.087	0.774
128	Gambia	4.306	1.050	0.853	0.393	0.807	0.223	0.042	0.938
129	Myanmar	4.287	1.211	0.977	0.488	0.722	0.292	0.160	0.436
130	Liberia	4.280	0.867	0.815	0.386	0.796	0.125	0.066	1.225
131	Togo	4.277	1.039	0.572	0.442	0.682	0.085	0.144	1.314
132	Madagascar	4.174	0.867	0.710	0.393	0.380	0.118	0.116	1.590
133	Zambia	4.106	1.109	0.861	0.250	0.991	0.139	0.101	0.654
134	Sri Lanka	4.013	1.496	1.130	0.567	0.872	0.111	0.059	-0.222
135	Ethiopia	3.985	1.033	0.854	0.453	0.653	0.144	0.097	0.753
136	Comoros	3.925	1.089	0.352	0.468	0.373	0.118	0.172	1.352
137	Eswatini	3.909	1.410	1.036	0.044	0.579	0.055	0.137	0.647
138	Tanzania	3.902	1.108	0.778	0.459	1.006	0.145	0.251	0.155
139	Egypt	3.862	1.558	0.862	0.521	0.727	0.022	0.097	0.074
140	DR Congo	3.761	0.857	0.792	0.321	0.720	0.146	0.066	0.860
141	Lebanon	3.723	1.428	1.050	0.416	0.434	0.074	0.057	0.265
142	Yemen	3.532	0.692	1.292	0.431	0.549	0.084	0.109	0.374
143	Botswana	3.464	1.582	0.989	0.017	0.860	0.022	0.093	-0.099
144	Zimbabwe	3.346	1.213	0.782	0.189	0.729	0.056	0.128	0.251
145	Malawi	3.284	0.864	0.326	0.299	0.812	0.109	0.143	0.730
146	Sierra Leone	3.251	1.054	0.692	0.405	0.800	0.131	0.052	0.117
147	Afghanistan	1.446	0.921	0.000	0.176	0.000	0.079	0.131	0.139

=== 2025 report ===
The 2025 report features the happiness score averaged over the years 2022–2024.

Table

Rank	Country or region	Life evaluation	GDP per capita	Social support	Healthy life expectancy	Freedom to make life choices	Generosity	Perceptions of corruption	Residual
1	Finland	7.736	1.749	1.783	0.824	0.986	0.110	0.502	1.782
2	Denmark	7.521	1.825	1.748	0.820	0.955	0.150	0.488	1.535
3	Iceland	7.515	1.799	1.840	0.873	0.971	0.201	0.173	1.659
4	Sweden	7.345	1.783	1.698	0.889	0.952	0.170	0.467	1.385
5	Netherlands	7.306	1.822	1.667	0.844	0.860	0.186	0.344	1.583
6	Costa Rica	7.274	1.492	1.600	0.680	0.948	0.067	0.118	2.369
7	Norway	7.262	1.902	1.711	0.863	0.962	0.168	0.425	1.231
8	Israel	7.234	1.695	1.743	0.824	0.740	0.144	0.193	1.895
9	Luxembourg	7.122	2.028	1.558	0.864	0.931	0.117	0.397	1.227
10	Mexico	6.979	1.435	1.504	0.550	0.879	0.057	0.118	2.438
11	Australia	6.974	1.767	1.647	0.841	0.857	0.164	0.285	1.413
12	New Zealand	6.952	1.698	1.712	0.815	0.861	0.167	0.429	1.270
13	Switzerland	6.935	1.870	1.622	0.883	0.889	0.156	0.468	1.047
14	Belgium	6.910	1.783	1.646	0.852	0.895	0.119	0.306	1.309
15	Ireland	6.889	1.988	1.659	0.823	0.906	0.179	0.382	0.952
16	Lithuania	6.829	1.684	1.699	0.592	0.702	0.031	0.123	1.998
17	Austria	6.810	1.791	1.592	0.814	0.856	0.179	0.280	1.297
18	Canada	6.803	1.749	1.647	0.832	0.813	0.168	0.323	1.271
19	Slovenia	6.792	1.692	1.718	0.802	0.961	0.121	0.113	1.384
20	Czechia	6.775	1.692	1.716	0.658	0.916	0.118	0.084	1.591
21	United Arab Emirates	6.759	1.812	1.294	0.659	0.934	0.165	0.235	1.660
22	Germany	6.753	1.785	1.625	0.776	0.858	0.148	0.351	1.210
23	United Kingdom	6.728	1.725	1.562	0.779	0.872	0.211	0.318	1.260
24	United States	6.724	1.839	1.614	0.604	0.644	0.171	0.161	1.690
25	Belize	6.711	1.256	1.540	0.525	1.018	0.072	0.082	2.218
26	Poland	6.673	1.666	1.595	0.630	0.790	0.021	0.169	1.802
27	Taiwan	6.669	1.730	1.583	0.817	0.760	0.057	0.187	1.534
28	Uruguay	6.661	1.554	1.654	0.523	0.913	0.078	0.197	1.741
29	Kosovo	6.659	1.281	1.454	0.896	0.893	0.201	0.087	1.847
30	Kuwait	6.629	1.691	1.481	0.766	0.934	0.143	0.167	1.448
31	Serbia	6.606	1.489	1.620	0.545	0.767	0.131	0.107	1.946
32	Saudi Arabia	6.600	1.743	1.566	0.714	0.915	0.105	0.187	1.370
33	France	6.593	1.733	1.535	0.832	0.743	0.099	0.264	1.386
34	Singapore	6.565	2.022	1.565	0.935	0.856	0.164	0.522	0.501
35	Romania	6.563	1.636	1.401	0.561	0.847	0.028	0.015	2.075
36	Brazil	6.494	1.391	1.519	0.480	0.830	0.089	0.127	2.057
37	El Salvador	6.492	1.222	1.228	0.559	0.955	0.054	0.264	2.211
38	Spain	6.466	1.690	1.685	0.894	0.734	0.112	0.180	1.170
39	Estonia	6.417	1.650	1.716	0.642	0.902	0.128	0.378	1.001
40	Italy	6.415	1.724	1.526	0.852	0.641	0.082	0.071	1.517
41	Panama	6.407	1.594	1.600	0.717	0.876	0.041	0.042	1.537
42	Argentina	6.397	1.504	1.622	0.579	0.824	0.048	0.083	1.736
43	Kazakhstan	6.378	1.586	1.688	0.504	0.878	0.111	0.118	1.492
44	Guatemala	6.362	1.249	1.330	0.376	0.882	0.075	0.085	2.365
45	Chile	6.361	1.537	1.577	0.711	0.779	0.093	0.085	1.579
46	Vietnam	6.352	1.278	1.533	0.631	1.012	0.039	0.174	1.684
47	Nicaragua	6.330	1.084	1.470	0.646	0.912	0.103	0.271	1.844
48	Malta	6.316	1.760	1.671	0.837	0.837	0.217	0.115	0.879
49	Thailand	6.222	1.426	1.551	0.633	0.927	0.223	0.039	1.423
50	Slovakia	6.221	1.629	1.762	0.547	0.704	0.058	0.070	1.451
51	Latvia	6.207	1.619	1.711	0.503	0.789	0.108	0.082	1.396
52	Oman	6.197	1.603	1.411	0.500	0.930	0.142		
53	Uzbekistan	6.193	1.179	1.615	0.654	0.977	0.195	0.208	1.364
54	Paraguay	6.172	1.329	1.615	0.291	0.921	0.097	0.063	1.857
55	Japan	6.147	1.678	1.550	0.921	0.746	0.014	0.200	1.038
56	Bosnia and Herzegovina	6.136	1.405	1.545	0.616	0.749	0.178	0.009	1.635
57	Philippines	6.107	1.177	1.385	0.315	0.966	0.075	0.110	2.079
58	South Korea	6.038	1.709	1.357	0.903	0.678	0.100	0.139	1.152
59	Bahrain	6.030	1.752	1.391	0.609	0.907	0.148	0.167	1.057
60	Portugal	6.013	1.646	1.560	0.822	0.879	0.040	0.034	1.032
61	Colombia	6.004	1.380	1.513	0.587	0.777	0.039	0.051	1.658
62	Ecuador	5.965	1.299	1.320	0.702	0.712	0.058	0.066	1.808
63	Honduras	5.964	1.036	1.187	0.436	0.862	0.134	0.079	2.229
64	Malaysia	5.955	1.571	1.315	0.446	0.991	0.181	0.110	1.341
65	Peru	5.947	1.323	1.364	0.551	0.710	0.050	0.021	1.929
66	Russian Federation	5.945	1.630	1.549	0.470	0.702	0.095	0.125	1.373
67	Cyprus	5.942	1.720	1.348	0.840	0.612	0.108	0.041	1.273
68	China	5.921	1.445	1.307	0.789	0.764	0.079	0.154	1.382
69	Hungary	5.915	1.638	1.742	0.587	0.681	0.099	0.057	1.111
70	Trinidad and Tobago	5.905	1.549	1.532	0.419	0.760	0.111	0.001	1.533
71	Montenegro	5.877	1.507	1.551	0.618	0.768	0.075	0.138	1.220
72	Croatia	5.870	1.644	1.673	0.669	0.478	0.022	0.065	1.319
73	Jamaica	5.870	1.182	1.545	0.504	0.869	0.075	0.019	1.676
74	Bolivia	5.868	1.173	1.356	0.346	0.817	0.067	0.052	2.057
75	Kyrgyzstan	5.858	1.032	1.715	0.647	0.981	0.169	0.053	1.261
76	Dominican Republic	5.846	1.457	1.500	0.615	0.866	0.063	0.186	1.160
77	Mongolia	5.833	1.336	1.731	0.423	0.629	0.180	0.053	1.481
78	Mauritius	5.832	1.499	1.521	0.617	0.761	0.095	0.130	1.209
79	Libya	5.820	1.247	1.309	0.549	0.724	0.111	0.214	1.666
80	Republic of Moldova	5.819	1.332	1.430	0.414	0.830	0.054	0.037	1.722
81	Greece	5.776	1.608	1.438	0.725	0.396	0.003	0.063	1.543
82	Venezuela	5.683	0.000	1.493	0.515	0.702	0.154	0.117	2.701
83	Indonesia	5.617	1.288	1.372	0.454	0.918	0.323	0.044	1.218
84	Algeria	5.571	1.315	1.363	0.782	0.522	0.057	0.219	1.313
85	Bulgaria	5.554	1.573	1.725	0.463	0.708	0.055	0.000	1.029
86	North Macedonia	5.503	1.458	1.537	0.544	0.637	0.130	0.007	1.190
87	Armenia	5.494	1.391	1.349	0.828	0.786	0.032	0.158	0.950
88	Hong Kong	5.491	1.790	1.410	0.948	0.674	0.116	0.386	0.168
89	Albania	5.411	1.371	1.122	0.696	0.841	0.103	0.057	1.220
90	Tajikistan	5.411	0.914	1.555	0.658		0.085	0.342	
91	Georgia	5.400	1.444	1.275	0.482	0.844	0.000	0.172	1.182
92	Nepal	5.311	0.944	1.210	0.463	0.764	0.155	0.099	1.676
93	Laos	5.301	1.122	1.010	0.493	0.916	0.145	0.164	1.452
94	Turkey	5.262	1.582	1.444	0.626	0.244	0.040	0.104	1.223
95	South Africa	5.213	1.283	1.465	0.142	0.676	0.064	0.043	1.540
96	Mozambique	5.190	0.559	1.131	0.124	0.813	0.127	0.173	2.262
97	Gabon	5.120	1.386	1.224	0.387	0.651	0.042	0.086	1.343
98	Ivory Coast	5.102	1.038	0.760	0.206	0.661	0.100	0.162	2.176
99	Iran	5.093	1.330	1.367	0.609	0.456	0.202	0.122	1.007
100	Congo	5.030	1.023	0.796	0.336	0.626	0.082	0.126	2.040
101	Iraq	4.976	1.261	1.275	0.589	0.503	0.100	0.069	1.178
102	Guinea	4.929	0.873	0.791	0.306	0.676	0.157	0.098	2.027
103	Namibia	4.911	1.182	1.482	0.104	0.564	0.052	0.056	1.470
104	Cameroon	4.887	0.944	0.986	0.302	0.662	0.099	0.060	1.834
105	Nigeria	4.885	0.989	1.245	0.380	0.639	0.170	0.028	1.433
106	Azerbaijan	4.875	1.428	1.030	0.707	0.785	0.076	0.179	0.670
107	Senegal	4.856	0.907	0.977	0.433	0.767	0.129	0.090	1.553
108	Palestine	4.780	1.047	1.456		0.618	0.055	0.081	
109	Pakistan	4.768	0.982	0.759	0.417	0.529	0.136	0.046	1.898
110	Niger	4.725	0.606	0.796	0.258	0.759	0.122	0.137	2.048
111	Ukraine	4.680	1.328	1.472	0.472	0.689	0.245	0.023	0.451
112	Morocco	4.622	1.139	0.635	0.585	0.748	0.031	0.095	1.388
113	Tunisia	4.552	1.257	1.224	0.459	0.382	0.032	0.050	1.149
114	Mauritania	4.542	1.023	0.919	0.516	0.454	0.113	0.195	1.323
115	Kenya	4.510	0.994	1.047	0.448	0.649	0.220	0.073	1.079
116	Uganda	4.461	0.762	1.342	0.396	0.751	0.148	0.050	1.012
117	Gambia	4.423	0.778	0.958	0.348	0.611	0.255	0.045	1.428
118	India	4.389	1.149	0.860	0.316	0.914	0.141	0.120	0.889
119	Chad	4.384	0.592	0.902	0.242	0.477	0.175	0.111	1.884
120	Burkina Faso	4.383	0.724	0.828	0.296	0.671	0.142	0.218	1.504
121	Benin	4.357	0.855	0.228	0.357	0.679	0.092	0.238	1.909
122	Somalia	4.347	0.535	0.877	0.046	0.916	0.206	0.192	1.575
123	Mali	4.345	0.709	0.908	0.318	0.767	0.093	0.114	1.436
124	Cambodia	4.341	1.049	1.215	0.481	0.988	0.138	0.078	0.393
125	Ghana	4.340	1.053	1.010	0.438	0.771	0.139	0.025	0.904
126	Myanmar	4.321	0.975	1.144	0.446	0.569	0.322	0.163	0.702
127	Togo	4.315	0.757	0.736	0.378	0.576	0.097	0.153	1.618
128	Jordan	4.310	1.158	1.202	0.573	0.700	0.051	0.164	0.461
129	Liberia	4.277	0.582	0.888	0.324	0.653	0.143	0.068	1.618
130	Madagascar	4.157	0.588	0.938	0.341	0.292	0.131	0.118	1.751
131	Zambia	3.912	0.848	1.013	0.233	0.872	0.131	0.107	0.709
132	Ethiopia	3.898	0.757	1.051	0.416	0.540	0.182	0.100	0.852
133	Sri Lanka	3.891	1.271	1.308	0.567	0.696	0.121	0.025	-0.099
134	Bangladesh	3.851	1.116	0.286	0.592	0.920	0.110	0.132	0.695
135	Egypt	3.817	1.347	1.075	0.473	0.593	0.018	0.103	0.210
136	Tanzania	3.800	0.847	0.908	0.411	0.858	0.153	0.243	0.380
137	Eswatini	3.774	1.183	1.152	0.038	0.428	0.054	0.130	0.790
138	Lesotho	3.757	0.737	1.131	0.000	0.606	0.065	0.072	1.145
139	Comoros	3.754	0.835	0.501	0.428	0.260	0.117	0.164	1.450
140	Yemen	3.561	0.631	1.482	0.375	0.447	0.066	0.106	0.454
141	DR Congo	3.469	0.544	0.929	0.278	0.600	0.151	0.061	0.906
142	Botswana	3.438	1.388	1.146	0.094	0.697	0.018	0.083	0.012
143	Zimbabwe	3.396	0.827	0.961	0.178	0.598	0.065	0.131	0.636
144	Malawi	3.260	0.588	0.489	0.280	0.677	0.115	0.136	0.975
145	Lebanon	3.188	1.223	0.984	0.440	0.279	0.071	0.041	0.150
146	Sierra Leone	2.998	0.786	0.692	0.327	0.613	0.138	0.052	0.391
147	Afghanistan	1.364	0.649	0.000	0.155	0.000	0.075	0.135	0.348

=== 2024 report ===
The 2024 report features the happiness score averaged over the years 2021–2023.

Table

Rank	Country or region	Life evaluation
1	Finland	7.741
2	Denmark	7.583
3	Iceland	7.525
4	Sweden	7.344
5	Israel	7.341
6	Netherlands	7.319
7	Norway	7.302
8	Luxembourg	7.122
9	Switzerland	7.060
10	Australia	7.057
11	New Zealand	7.029
12	Costa Rica	6.955
13	Kuwait	6.951
14	Austria	6.905
15	Canada	6.900
16	Belgium	6.894
17	Ireland	6.838
18	Czechia	6.822
19	Lithuania	6.818
20	United Kingdom	6.749
21	Slovenia	6.743
22	United Arab Emirates	6.733
23	United States	6.725
24	Germany	6.719
25	Mexico	6.678
26	Uruguay	6.611
27	France	6.609
28	Saudi Arabia	6.594
29	Kosovo	6.561
30	Singapore	6.523
31	Taiwan	6.503
32	Romania	6.491
33	El Salvador	6.469
34	Estonia	6.448
35	Poland	6.442
36	Spain	6.421
37	Serbia	6.411
38	Chile	6.360
39	Panama	6.358
40	Malta	6.346
41	Italy	6.324
42	Guatemala	6.287
43	Nicaragua	6.284
44	Brazil	6.272
45	Slovakia	6.257
46	Latvia	6.234
47	Uzbekistan	6.195
48	Argentina	6.188
49	Kazakhstan	6.188
50	Cyprus	6.068
51	Japan	6.060
52	South Korea	6.058
53	Philippines	6.048
54	Vietnam	6.043
55	Portugal	6.030
56	Hungary	6.017
57	Paraguay	5.977
58	Thailand	5.976
59	Malaysia	5.975
60	China	5.973
61	Honduras	5.968
62	Bahrain	5.959
63	Croatia	5.942
64	Greece	5.934
65	Bosnia and Herzegovina	5.877
66	Libya	5.866
67	Jamaica	5.842
68	Peru	5.841
69	Dominican Republic	5.823
70	Mauritius	5.816
71	Moldova	5.816
72	Russia	5.785
73	Bolivia	5.784
74	Ecuador	5.725
75	Kyrgyzstan	5.714
76	Montenegro	5.707
77	Mongolia	5.696
78	Colombia	5.695
79	Venezuela	5.607
80	Indonesia	5.568
81	Bulgaria	5.463
82	Armenia	5.455
83	South Africa	5.422
84	North Macedonia	5.369
85	Algeria	5.364
86	Hong Kong	5.316
87	Albania	5.304
88	Tajikistan	5.281
89	Congo (Brazzaville)	5.221
90	Mozambique	5.216
91	Georgia	5.185
92	Iraq	5.166
93	Nepal	5.158
94	Laos	5.139
95	Gabon	5.106
96	Ivory Coast	5.080
97	Guinea	5.023
98	Turkey	4.975
99	Senegal	4.969
100	Iran	4.923
101	Azerbaijan	4.893
102	Nigeria	4.881
103	State of Palestine	4.879
104	Cameroon	4.874
105	Ukraine	4.873
106	Namibia	4.832
107	Morocco	4.795
108	Pakistan	4.657
109	Niger	4.556
110	Burkina Faso	4.548
111	Mauritania	4.505
112	Gambia	4.485
113	Chad	4.471
114	Kenya	4.470
115	Tunisia	4.422
116	Benin	4.377
117	Uganda	4.372
118	Myanmar	4.354
119	Cambodia	4.341
120	Ghana	4.289
121	Liberia	4.269
122	Mali	4.232
123	Madagascar	4.228
124	Togo	4.214
125	Jordan	4.186
126	India	4.054
127	Egypt	3.977
128	Sri Lanka	3.898
129	Bangladesh	3.886
130	Ethiopia	3.861
131	Tanzania	3.781
132	Comoros	3.566
133	Yemen	3.561
134	Zambia	3.502
135	Eswatini	3.502
136	Malawi	3.421
137	Botswana	3.383
138	Zimbabwe	3.341
139	Congo (Kinshasa)	3.295
140	Sierra Leone	3.245
141	Lesotho	3.186
142	Lebanon	2.707
143	Afghanistan	1.721

=== 2023 report ===
The 2023 report features the happiness score averaged over the years 2020–2022.

Table

Rank	Country or region
1	Finland
2	Denmark
3	Iceland
4	Israel
5	Netherlands
6	Sweden
7	Norway
8	Switzerland
9	Luxembourg
10	New Zealand
11	Austria
12	Australia
13	Canada
14	Ireland
15	United States
16	Germany
17	Belgium
18	Czech Republic
19	United Kingdom
20	Lithuania
21	France
22	Slovenia
23	Costa Rica
24	Romania
25	Singapore*
26	United Arab Emirates
27	Taiwan
28	Uruguay
29	Slovakia*
30	Saudi Arabia
31	Estonia
32	Spain
33	Italy
34	Kosovo
35	Chile
36	Mexico
37	Malta
38	Panama
39	Poland
40	Nicaragua
41	Latvia
42	Bahrain*
43	Guatemala
44	Kazakhstan
45	Serbia*
46	Cyprus
47	Japan
48	Croatia
49	Brazil
50	El Salvador
51	Hungary
52	Argentina
53	Honduras
54	Uzbekistan
55	Malaysia*
56	Portugal
57	South Korea
58	Greece
59	Mauritius
60	Thailand
61	Mongolia
62	Kyrgyzstan
63	Moldova
64	China*
65	Vietnam
66	Paraguay
67	Montenegro*
68	Jamaica
69	Bolivia
70	Russia
71	Bosnia and Herzegovina*
72	Colombia
73	Dominican Republic
74	Ecuador
75	Peru
76	Philippines*
77	Bulgaria
78	Nepal
79	Armenia
80	Tajikistan*
81	Algeria*
82	Hong Kong
83	Albania
84	Indonesia
85	South Africa*
86	Congo, Republic of
87	North Macedonia
88	Venezuela
89	Laos*
90	Georgia
91	Guinea
92	Ukraine
93	Ivory Coast
94	Gabon
95	Nigeria*
96	Cameroon
97	Mozambique
98	Iraq*
99	Palestine
100	Morocco
101	Iran
102	Senegal
103	Mauritania
104	Burkina Faso*
105	Namibia
106	Turkey*
107	Ghana
108	Pakistan
109	Niger
110	Tunisia
111	Kenya
112	Sri Lanka*
113	Uganda*
114	Chad
115	Cambodia
116	Benin
117	Myanmar*
118	Bangladesh
119	Gambia
120	Mali
121	Egypt
122	Togo
123	Jordan
124	Ethiopia
125	Liberia
126	India
127	Madagascar
128	Zambia*
129	Tanzania
130	Comoros
131	Malawi
132	Botswana
133	Congo, Democratic Republic of
134	Zimbabwe
135	Sierra Leone
136	Lebanon
137	Afghanistan

* indicates the country does not have survey information in 2022. Their averages are based on the 2020 and 2021 surveys.

=== 2022 report ===
The 2022 report features the happiness score averaged over the years 2019–2021.

Table

Rank	Country or region
1	Finland
2	Denmark
3	Iceland
4	Switzerland
5	Netherlands
6	Luxembourg
7	Sweden
8	Norway
9	Israel
10	New Zealand
11	Austria
12	Australia
13	Ireland
14	Germany
15	Canada
16	United States
17	United Kingdom
18	Czech Republic
19	Belgium
20	France

=== 2020 report ===
The 2020 report features the happiness score averaged over the years 2017–2019. Finland is the 'happiest' country in the world, followed by Denmark, Switzerland, Iceland, and Norway. The data comes from the Gallup World Poll, based entirely on survey scores and answers to the main life evaluation question asked in the poll.

Table

Rank	Country or region	Life evaluation	GDP per capita	Social support	Healthy life expectancy	Freedom to make life choices	Generosity	Perceptions of corruption
1	Finland	7.809	1.285	1.500	0.961	0.662	0.160	0.478
2	Denmark	7.646	1.327	1.503	0.979	0.665	0.243	0.495
3	Switzerland	7.560	1.391	1.472	1.041	0.629	0.269	0.408
4	Iceland	7.504	1.327	1.548	1.001	0.662	0.362	0.145
5	Norway	7.488	1.424	1.495	1.008	0.670	0.288	0.434
6	Netherlands	7.449	1.339	1.464	0.976	0.614	0.336	0.369
7	Sweden	7.353	1.322	1.433	0.986	0.650	0.273	0.442
8	New Zealand	7.300	1.242	1.487	1.008	0.647	0.326	0.461
9	Austria	7.294	1.317	1.437	1.001	0.603	0.256	0.281
10	Luxembourg	7.238	1.537	1.388	0.986	0.610	0.196	0.367
11	Canada	7.232	1.302	1.435	1.023	0.644	0.282	0.352
12	Australia	7.223	1.310	1.477	1.023	0.622	0.325	0.336
13	United Kingdom	7.165	1.273	1.458	0.976	0.525	0.373	0.323
14	Israel	7.129	1.216	1.403	1.008	0.421	0.267	0.100
15	Costa Rica	7.121	0.981	1.375	0.940	0.645	0.131	0.096
16	Ireland	7.094	1.447	1.471	0.976	0.588	0.295	0.373
17	Germany	7.076	1.314	1.369	0.972	0.564	0.252	0.309
18	United States	6.940	1.374	1.405	0.832	0.535	0.298	0.152
19	Czech Republic	6.911	1.212	1.405	0.895	0.506	0.046	0.050
20	Belgium	6.864	1.296	1.399	0.965	0.500	0.147	0.209
21	United Arab Emirates	6.791	1.431	1.251	0.788	0.653	0.281	0.220
22	Malta	6.773	1.253	1.443	0.972	0.633	0.341	0.179
23	France	6.664	1.268	1.459	1.030	0.514	0.113	0.227
24	Mexico	6.465	1.024	1.226	0.832	0.554	0.083	0.083
25	Taiwan	6.455	1.327	1.358	0.878	0.449	0.151	0.132
26	Uruguay	6.440	1.071	1.425	0.857	0.594	0.132	0.193
27	Saudi Arabia	6.406	1.334	1.310	0.760	0.548	0.087	0.163
28	Spain	6.401	1.231	1.421	1.051	0.426	0.165	0.110
29	Guatemala	6.399	0.754	1.174	0.706	0.613	0.171	0.098
30	Italy	6.387	1.236	1.347	1.023	0.321	0.170	0.040
31	Singapore	6.377	1.520	1.395	1.138	0.635	0.219	0.533
32	Brazil	6.376	0.953	1.363	0.766	0.483	0.132	0.107
33	Slovenia	6.363	1.209	1.465	0.933	0.647	0.146	0.077
34	El Salvador	6.348	0.749	1.149	0.753	0.524	0.119	0.117
35	Kosovo	6.325	0.840	1.184	0.673	0.557	0.325	0.009
36	Panama	6.305	1.098	1.376	0.879	0.580	0.097	0.054
37	Slovakia	6.281	1.195	1.424	0.853	0.424	0.117	0.011
38	Uzbekistan	6.258	0.697	1.434	0.717	0.693	0.363	0.280
39	Chile	6.228	1.097	1.323	0.889	0.417	0.156	0.063
40	Bahrain	6.227	1.297	1.315	0.839	0.610	0.287	0.127
41	Lithuania	6.215	1.194	1.433	0.795	0.420	0.054	0.081
42	Trinidad and Tobago	6.192	1.168	1.407	0.659	0.553	0.199	0.015
43	Poland	6.186	1.169	1.310	0.868	0.558	0.063	0.161
44	Colombia	6.163	0.932	1.334	0.810	0.527	0.092	0.046
45	Cyprus	6.159	1.213	1.149	1.026	0.459	0.228	0.051
46	Nicaragua	6.137	0.620	1.271	0.803	0.560	0.213	0.174
47	Romania	6.124	1.120	1.194	0.792	0.535	0.068	0.001
48	Kuwait	6.102	1.425	1.245	0.776	0.570	0.133	0.113
49	Mauritius	6.101	1.074	1.396	0.763	0.591	0.187	0.084
50	Kazakhstan	6.058	1.123	1.453	0.699	0.497	0.154	0.110
51	Estonia	6.022	1.192	1.453	0.843	0.577	0.125	0.202
52	Philippines	6.006	0.775	1.245	0.602	0.622	0.129	0.130
53	Hungary	6.000	1.164	1.423	0.807	0.386	0.070	0.028
54	Thailand	5.999	1.007	1.348	0.794	0.609	0.377	0.032
55	Argentina	5.975	1.028	1.373	0.850	0.521	0.070	0.060
56	Honduras	5.953	0.599	1.187	0.792	0.568	0.257	0.087
57	Latvia	5.950	1.141	1.414	0.778	0.329	0.075	0.090
58	Ecuador	5.925	0.853	1.221	0.839	0.555	0.115	0.087
59	Portugal	5.911	1.169	1.340	0.979	0.590	0.053	0.028
60	Jamaica	5.890	0.779	1.408	0.788	0.553	0.116	0.030
61	South Korea	5.872	1.245	1.134	1.023	0.259	0.170	0.095
62	Japan	5.871	1.267	1.332	1.073	0.495	0.036	0.181
63	Peru	5.797	0.919	1.208	0.824	0.513	0.092	0.027
64	Serbia	5.778	0.988	1.327	0.828	0.395	0.150	0.059
65	Bolivia	5.747	0.731	1.142	0.662	0.574	0.138	0.073
66	Pakistan	5.693	0.617	0.873	0.470	0.405	0.229	0.123
67	Paraguay	5.692	0.898	1.368	0.736	0.587	0.204	0.065
68	Dominican Republic	5.689	0.983	1.329	0.742	0.563	0.112	0.116
69	Bosnia and Herzegovina	5.674	0.918	1.204	0.814	0.305	0.264	0.001
70	Moldova	5.608	0.708	1.237	0.713	0.390	0.174	0.014
71	Tajikistan	5.556	0.475	1.218	0.681	0.521	0.182	0.222
72	Montenegro	5.546	1.010	1.266	0.839	0.303	0.149	0.098
73	Russia	5.546	1.127	1.379	0.680	0.399	0.099	0.046
74	Kyrgyzstan	5.542	0.513	1.341	0.681	0.615	0.301	0.030
75	Belarus	5.540	1.019	1.387	0.753	0.291	0.090	0.194
76	Northern Cyprus	5.536	1.213	1.183	1.026	0.478	0.199	0.200
77	Greece	5.515	1.128	1.169	0.979	0.174	0.000	0.049
78	Hong Kong	5.510	1.377	1.244	1.137	0.459	0.288	0.332
79	Croatia	5.505	1.109	1.311	0.901	0.381	0.114	0.012
80	Libya	5.489	1.022	1.196	0.616	0.451	0.143	0.172
81	Mongolia	5.456	0.905	1.459	0.616	0.356	0.264	0.047
82	Malaysia	5.384	1.168	1.174	0.789	0.597	0.275	0.062
83	Vietnam	5.353	0.718	1.253	0.819	0.651	0.136	0.090
84	Indonesia	5.286	0.892	1.155	0.610	0.568	0.543	0.038
85	Ivory Coast	5.233	0.537	0.800	0.155	0.397	0.170	0.093
86	Benin	5.216	0.366	0.352	0.328	0.406	0.197	0.126
87	Maldives	5.198	0.938	1.402	0.914	0.548	0.224	0.072
88	Congo (Brazzaville)	5.194	0.634	0.758	0.458	0.387	0.117	0.119
89	Azerbaijan	5.165	0.990	1.181	0.731	0.468	0.040	0.247
90	North Macedonia	5.160	0.935	1.183	0.803	0.410	0.186	0.025
91	Ghana	5.148	0.576	0.966	0.432	0.477	0.261	0.057
92	Nepal	5.137	0.444	1.101	0.669	0.481	0.301	0.128
93	Turkey	5.132	1.127	1.197	0.781	0.254	0.086	0.121
94	China	5.124	0.991	1.132	0.867	0.602	0.079	0.117
95	Turkmenistan	5.119	1.009	1.510	0.612	0.515	0.323	0.034
96	Bulgaria	5.102	1.047	1.461	0.778	0.418	0.104	0.000
97	Morocco	5.095	0.759	0.645	0.745	0.450	0.040	0.077
98	Cameroon	5.085	0.504	0.900	0.270	0.439	0.198	0.054
99	Venezuela	5.053	0.770	1.349	0.767	0.272	0.087	0.064
100	Algeria	5.005	0.944	1.143	0.745	0.084	0.119	0.129
101	Senegal	4.981	0.504	0.955	0.518	0.352	0.164	0.082
102	Guinea	4.949	0.390	0.751	0.334	0.372	0.249	0.112
103	Niger	4.910	0.108	0.704	0.299	0.435	0.208	0.138
104	Laos	4.889	0.715	0.987	0.486	0.612	0.273	0.194
105	Albania	4.883	0.907	0.830	0.846	0.462	0.171	0.025
106	Cambodia	4.848	0.545	1.071	0.588	0.675	0.233	0.073
107	Bangladesh	4.833	0.556	0.869	0.695	0.604	0.177	0.177
108	Gabon	4.829	0.988	1.106	0.523	0.369	0.052	0.056
109	South Africa	4.814	0.902	1.259	0.407	0.435	0.126	0.060
110	Iraq	4.785	0.982	1.011	0.529	0.284	0.153	0.073
111	Lebanon	4.772	0.889	1.192	0.789	0.186	0.159	0.022
112	Burkina Faso	4.769	0.302	0.929	0.313	0.322	0.186	0.126
113	Gambia	4.751	0.257	0.883	0.353	0.403	0.426	0.158
114	Mali	4.729	0.352	0.973	0.235	0.378	0.170	0.062
115	Nigeria	4.724	0.646	0.987	0.168	0.435	0.221	0.048
116	Armenia	4.677	0.808	1.035	0.776	0.378	0.107	0.105
117	Georgia	4.673	0.847	0.731	0.695	0.485	0.048	0.174
118	Iran	4.672	1.029	0.886	0.749	0.301	0.277	0.143
119	Jordan	4.633	0.785	1.140	0.778	0.425	0.091	0.152
120	Mozambique	4.624	0.179	0.955	0.324	0.561	0.220	0.163
121	Kenya	4.583	0.476	0.905	0.536	0.519	0.394	0.067
122	Namibia	4.571	0.840	1.246	0.407	0.445	0.076	0.054
123	Ukraine	4.561	0.780	1.321	0.699	0.319	0.179	0.010
124	Liberia	4.558	0.174	0.921	0.392	0.406	0.227	0.051
125	Palestine	4.553	0.588	1.195	0.614	0.299	0.092	0.072
126	Uganda	4.432	0.312	1.052	0.378	0.402	0.265	0.064
127	Chad	4.423	0.302	0.739	0.109	0.229	0.211	0.086
128	Tunisia	4.392	0.875	0.872	0.781	0.236	0.056	0.044
129	Mauritania	4.375	0.540	1.113	0.425	0.186	0.129	0.122
130	Sri Lanka	4.327	0.898	1.195	0.792	0.529	0.253	0.049
131	Congo (Kinshasa)	4.311	0.062	0.833	0.277	0.365	0.254	0.081
132	Eswatini	4.308	0.828	1.065	0.216	0.300	0.067	0.147
133	Myanmar	4.308	0.678	1.098	0.495	0.597	0.570	0.188
134	Comoros	4.289	0.416	0.723	0.437	0.181	0.259	0.100
135	Togo	4.187	0.268	0.548	0.343	0.304	0.201	0.115
136	Ethiopia	4.186	0.315	1.001	0.484	0.413	0.228	0.117
137	Madagascar	4.166	0.245	0.824	0.501	0.193	0.191	0.076
138	Egypt	4.151	0.875	0.983	0.597	0.374	0.069	0.095
139	Sierra Leone	3.926	0.241	0.748	0.204	0.382	0.258	0.048
140	Burundi	3.775	0.000	0.404	0.295	0.275	0.187	0.212
141	Zambia	3.759	0.537	0.896	0.364	0.491	0.251	0.087
142	Haiti	3.721	0.285	0.647	0.374	0.169	0.464	0.162
143	Lesotho	3.653	0.455	1.089	0.101	0.409	0.103	0.050
144	India	3.573	0.731	0.644	0.541	0.581	0.237	0.106
145	Malawi	3.538	0.177	0.530	0.446	0.487	0.213	0.132
146	Yemen	3.527	0.393	1.177	0.415	0.244	0.095	0.087
147	Botswana	3.479	0.998	1.086	0.494	0.509	0.033	0.102
148	Tanzania	3.476	0.457	0.873	0.443	0.509	0.272	0.204
149	Central African Republic	3.476	0.041	0.000	0.000	0.293	0.254	0.028
150	Rwanda	3.312	0.343	0.523	0.572	0.604	0.236	0.486
151	Zimbabwe	3.299	0.426	1.048	0.375	0.377	0.151	0.081
152	South Sudan	2.817	0.289	0.553	0.209	0.066	0.210	0.111
153	Afghanistan	2.567	0.301	0.356	0.266	0.000	0.135	0.001

=== 2019 report ===
The 2019 report features the happiness score averaged over the years 2016–2018. As per the 2019 Happiness Index, Finland is the 'happiest' country in the world. Denmark, Norway, Iceland and Netherlands hold the next top positions. The report was published on 20 March 2019 by UN. The full report can be read at 2019 Report. The World Happiness Report is a landmark survey of the state of global happiness.

Table

Rank	Country or region	Life evaluation	GDP per capita	Social support	Healthy life expectancy	Freedom to make life choices	Generosity	Perceptions of corruption
1	Finland	7.769	1.340	1.587	0.986	0.596	0.153	0.393
2	Denmark	7.600	1.383	1.573	0.996	0.592	0.252	0.410
3	Norway	7.554	1.488	1.582	1.028	0.603	0.271	0.341
4	Iceland	7.494	1.380	1.624	1.026	0.591	0.354	0.118
5	Netherlands	7.488	1.396	1.522	0.999	0.557	0.322	0.298
6	Switzerland	7.480	1.452	1.526	1.052	0.572	0.263	0.343
7	Sweden	7.343	1.387	1.487	1.009	0.574	0.267	0.373
8	New Zealand	7.307	1.303	1.557	1.026	0.585	0.330	0.380
9	Canada	7.278	1.365	1.505	1.039	0.584	0.285	0.308
10	Austria	7.246	1.376	1.475	1.016	0.532	0.244	0.226
11	Australia	7.228	1.372	1.548	1.036	0.557	0.332	0.290
12	Costa Rica	7.167	1.034	1.441	0.963	0.558	0.144	0.093
13	Israel	7.139	1.276	1.455	1.029	0.371	0.261	0.082
14	Luxembourg	7.090	1.609	1.479	1.012	0.526	0.194	0.316
15	United Kingdom	7.054	1.333	1.538	0.996	0.450	0.348	0.278
16	Ireland	7.021	1.499	1.553	0.999	0.516	0.298	0.310
17	Germany	6.985	1.373	1.454	0.987	0.495	0.261	0.265
18	Belgium	6.923	1.356	1.504	0.986	0.473	0.160	0.210
19	United States of America	6.892	1.433	1.457	0.874	0.454	0.280	0.128
20	Czech Republic	6.852	1.269	1.487	0.920	0.457	0.046	0.036
21	United Arab Emirates	6.825	1.503	1.310	0.825	0.598	0.262	0.182
22	Malta	6.726	1.300	1.520	0.999	0.564	0.375	0.151
23	Mexico	6.595	1.070	1.323	0.861	0.433	0.074	0.073
24	France	6.592	1.324	1.472	1.045	0.436	0.111	0.183
25	Taiwan	6.446	1.368	1.430	0.914	0.351	0.242	0.097
26	Chile	6.444	1.159	1.369	0.920	0.357	0.187	0.056
27	Guatemala	6.436	0.800	1.269	0.746	0.535	0.175	0.078
28	Saudi Arabia	6.375	1.403	1.357	0.795	0.439	0.080	0.132
29	Qatar	6.374	1.684	1.313	0.871	0.555	0.220	0.167
30	Spain	6.354	1.286	1.484	1.062	0.362	0.153	0.079
31	Panama	6.321	1.149	1.442	0.910	0.516	0.109	0.054
32	Brazil	6.300	1.004	1.439	0.802	0.390	0.099	0.086
33	Uruguay	6.293	1.124	1.465	0.891	0.523	0.127	0.150
34	Singapore	6.262	1.572	1.463	1.141	0.556	0.271	0.453
35	El Salvador	6.253	0.794	1.242	0.789	0.430	0.093	0.074
36	Italy	6.223	1.294	1.488	1.039	0.231	0.158	0.030
37	Bahrain	6.199	1.362	1.368	0.871	0.536	0.255	0.110
38	Slovakia	6.198	1.246	1.504	0.881	0.334	0.121	0.014
39	Trinidad & Tobago	6.192	1.231	1.477	0.713	0.489	0.185	0.016
40	Poland	6.182	1.206	1.438	0.884	0.483	0.117	0.050
41	Uzbekistan	6.174	0.745	1.529	0.756	0.631	0.322	0.240
42	Lithuania	6.149	1.238	1.515	0.818	0.291	0.043	0.042
43	Colombia	6.125	0.985	1.410	0.841	0.470	0.099	0.034
44	Slovenia	6.118	1.258	1.523	0.953	0.564	0.144	0.057
45	Nicaragua	6.105	0.694	1.325	0.835	0.435	0.200	0.127
46	Kosovo	6.100	0.882	1.232	0.758	0.489	0.262	0.006
47	Argentina	6.086	1.092	1.432	0.881	0.471	0.066	0.050
48	Romania	6.070	1.162	1.232	0.825	0.462	0.083	0.005
49	Cyprus	6.046	1.263	1.223	1.042	0.406	0.190	0.041
50	Ecuador	6.028	0.912	1.312	0.868	0.498	0.126	0.087
51	Kuwait	6.011	1.050	1.409	0.828	0.557	0.359	0.028
52	Thailand	6.008	1.050	1.409	0.828	0.557	0.359	0.028
53	Latvia	5.940	1.187	1.465	0.812	0.264	0.075	0.064
54	South Korea	5.895	1.301	1.219	1.036	0.159	0.175	0.056
55	Estonia	5.893	1.237	1.528	0.874	0.495	0.103	0.161
56	Jamaica	5.890	0.831	1.478	0.831	0.490	0.107	0.028
57	Mauritius	5.888	1.120	1.402	0.798	0.498	0.215	0.060
58	Japan	5.886	1.327	1.419	1.088	0.445	0.069	0.140
59	Honduras	5.860	0.642	1.236	0.828	0.507	0.246	0.078
60	Kazakhstan	5.809	1.173	1.508	0.729	0.410	0.146	0.096
61	Bolivia	5.779	0.776	1.209	0.706	0.511	0.137	0.064
62	Hungary	5.758	1.201	1.410	0.828	0.199	0.081	0.020
63	Paraguay	5.743	0.855	1.475	0.777	0.514	0.184	0.080
64	Northern Cyprus	5.718	1.263	1.252	1.042	0.417	0.191	0.162
65	Peru	5.697	0.960	1.274	0.854	0.455	0.083	0.027
66	Portugal	5.693	1.221	1.431	0.999	0.508	0.047	0.025
67	Pakistan	5.653	0.677	0.886	0.535	0.313	0.220	0.098
68	Russia	5.648	1.183	1.452	0.726	0.334	0.082	0.031
69	Philippines	5.631	0.807	1.293	0.657	0.558	0.117	0.107
70	Serbia	5.603	1.004	1.383	0.854	0.282	0.137	0.039
71	Moldova	5.529	0.685	1.328	0.739	0.245	0.181	0.000
72	Libya	5.525	1.044	1.303	0.673	0.416	0.133	0.152
73	Montenegro	5.523	1.051	1.361	0.871	0.197	0.142	0.080
74	Tajikistan	5.467	0.493	1.098	0.718	0.389	0.230	0.144
75	Croatia	5.432	1.155	1.266	0.914	0.296	0.119	0.022
76	Hong Kong	5.430	1.438	1.277	1.122	0.440	0.258	0.287
77	Dominican Republic	5.425	1.015	1.401	0.779	0.497	0.113	0.101
78	Bosnia and Herzegovina	5.386	0.945	1.212	0.845	0.212	0.263	0.006
79	Turkey	5.373	1.183	1.360	0.808	0.195	0.083	0.106
80	Malaysia	5.339	1.221	1.171	0.828	0.508	0.260	0.024
81	Belarus	5.323	1.067	1.465	0.789	0.235	0.094	0.142
82	Greece	5.287	1.181	1.156	0.999	0.067	0.000	0.034
83	Mongolia	5.285	0.948	1.531	0.667	0.317	0.235	0.038
84	North Macedonia	5.274	0.983	1.294	0.838	0.345	0.185	0.034
85	Nigeria	5.265	0.696	1.111	0.245	0.426	0.215	0.041
86	Kyrgyzstan	5.261	0.551	1.438	0.723	0.508	0.300	0.023
87	Turkmenistan	5.247	1.052	1.538	0.657	0.394	0.244	0.028
88	Algeria	5.211	1.002	1.160	0.785	0.086	0.073	0.114
89	Morocco	5.208	0.801	0.782	0.782	0.418	0.036	0.076
90	Azerbaijan	5.208	1.043	1.147	0.769	0.351	0.035	0.182
91	Lebanon	5.197	0.987	1.224	0.815	0.216	0.166	0.027
92	Indonesia	5.192	0.931	1.203	0.660	0.491	0.498	0.028
93	China	5.191	1.029	1.125	0.893	0.521	0.058	0.100
94	Vietnam	5.175	0.741	1.346	0.851	0.543	0.147	0.073
95	Bhutan	5.082	0.813	1.321	0.604	0.457	0.370	0.167
96	Cameroon	5.044	0.549	0.910	0.331	0.381	0.187	0.037
97	Bulgaria	5.011	1.092	1.513	0.815	0.311	0.081	0.004
98	Ghana	4.996	0.611	0.868	0.486	0.381	0.245	0.040
99	Ivory Coast	4.944	0.569	0.808	0.232	0.352	0.154	0.090
100	Nepal	4.913	0.446	1.226	0.677	0.439	0.285	0.089
101	Jordan	4.906	0.837	1.225	0.815	0.383	0.110	0.130
102	Benin	4.883	0.393	0.437	0.397	0.349	0.175	0.082
103	Congo (Brazzaville)	4.812	0.673	0.799	0.508	0.372	0.105	0.093
104	Gabon	4.799	1.057	1.183	0.571	0.295	0.043	0.055
105	Laos	4.796	0.764	1.030	0.551	0.547	0.266	0.164
106	South Africa	4.722	0.960	1.351	0.469	0.389	0.130	0.055
107	Albania	4.719	0.947	0.848	0.874	0.383	0.178	0.027
108	Venezuela	4.707	0.960	1.427	0.805	0.154	0.064	0.047
109	Cambodia	4.700	0.574	1.122	0.637	0.609	0.232	0.062
110	Palestinian Territories	4.696	0.657	1.247	0.672	0.225	0.103	0.066
111	Senegal	4.681	0.450	1.134	0.571	0.292	0.153	0.072
112	Somalia	4.668	0.000	0.698	0.268	0.559	0.243	0.270
113	Namibia	4.639	0.879	1.313	0.477	0.401	0.070	0.056
114	Niger	4.628	0.138	0.774	0.366	0.318	0.188	0.102
115	Burkina Faso	4.587	0.331	1.056	0.380	0.255	0.177	0.113
116	Armenia	4.559	0.850	1.055	0.815	0.283	0.095	0.064
117	Iran	4.548	1.100	0.842	0.785	0.305	0.270	0.125
118	Guinea	4.534	0.380	0.829	0.375	0.332	0.207	0.086
119	Georgia	4.519	0.886	0.666	0.752	0.346	0.043	0.164
120	Gambia	4.516	0.308	0.939	0.428	0.382	0.269	0.167
121	Kenya	4.509	0.512	0.983	0.581	0.431	0.372	0.053
122	Mauritania	4.490	0.570	1.167	0.489	0.066	0.106	0.088
123	Mozambique	4.466	0.204	0.986	0.390	0.494	0.197	0.138
124	Tunisia	4.461	0.921	1.000	0.815	0.167	0.059	0.055
125	Bangladesh	4.456	0.562	0.928	0.723	0.527	0.166	0.143
126	Iraq	4.437	1.043	0.980	0.574	0.241	0.148	0.089
127	Congo (Kinshasa)	4.418	0.094	1.125	0.357	0.269	0.212	0.053
128	Mali	4.390	0.385	1.105	0.308	0.327	0.153	0.052
129	Sierra Leone	4.374	0.268	0.841	0.242	0.309	0.252	0.045
130	Sri Lanka	4.366	0.949	1.265	0.831	0.470	0.244	0.047
131	Myanmar	4.360	0.710	1.181	0.555	0.525	0.566	0.172
132	Chad	4.350	0.350	0.766	0.192	0.174	0.198	0.078
133	Ukraine	4.332	0.820	1.390	0.739	0.178	0.187	0.010
134	Ethiopia	4.286	0.336	1.033	0.532	0.344	0.209	0.100
135	Eswatini	4.212	0.811	1.149	0.000	0.313	0.074	0.135
136	Uganda	4.189	0.332	1.069	0.443	0.356	0.252	0.060
137	Egypt	4.166	0.913	1.039	0.644	0.241	0.076	0.067
138	Zambia	4.107	0.578	1.058	0.426	0.431	0.247	0.087
139	Togo	4.085	0.275	0.572	0.410	0.293	0.177	0.085
140	India	4.015	0.755	0.765	0.588	0.498	0.200	0.085
141	Liberia	3.975	0.073	0.922	0.443	0.370	0.233	0.033
142	Comoros	3.973	0.274	0.757	0.505	0.142	0.275	0.078
143	Madagascar	3.933	0.274	0.916	0.555	0.148	0.169	0.041
144	Lesotho	3.802	0.489	1.169	0.168	0.359	0.107	0.093
145	Burundi	3.775	0.046	0.447	0.380	0.220	0.176	0.180
146	Zimbabwe	3.663	0.366	1.114	0.433	0.361	0.151	0.089
147	Haiti	3.597	0.323	0.688	0.449	0.026	0.419	0.110
148	Botswana	3.488	1.041	1.145	0.538	0.455	0.025	0.100
149	Syria	3.462	0.619	0.378	0.440	0.013	0.331	0.141
150	Malawi	3.410	0.191	0.560	0.495	0.443	0.218	0.089
151	Yemen	3.380	0.287	1.163	0.463	0.143	0.108	0.077
152	Rwanda	3.334	0.359	0.711	0.614	0.555	0.217	0.411
153	Tanzania	3.231	0.476	0.885	0.499	0.417	0.276	0.147
154	Afghanistan	3.203	0.350	0.517	0.361	0.000	0.158	0.025
155	Central African Republic	3.083	0.026	0.000	0.105	0.225	0.235	0.035
156	South Sudan	2.853	0.306	0.575	0.295	0.010	0.202	0.091

=== 2018 report ===
The 2018 report features the happiness score averaged over the years 2015–2017. As per the 2018 Happiness Index, Finland is the 'happiest' country in the world. Norway, Denmark, Iceland and Switzerland hold the next top positions. The report was published on 14 March 2018 by UN. The full report can be read at 2018 Report. The World Happiness Report is a landmark survey of the state of global happiness. The World Happiness Report 2018, which ranks 156 countries by their happiness levels, and 117 countries by the happiness of their immigrants, was released on March 14 at a launch event at the Pontifical Academy of Sciences in the Vatican.

Table

Rank	Country or region	Life evaluation	GDP per capita	Social support	Healthy life expectancy	Freedom to make life choices	Generosity	Perceptions of corruption
1	Finland	7.632	1.305	1.592	0.874	0.681	0.202	0.393
2	Norway	7.594	1.456	1.582	0.861	0.686	0.286	0.340
3	Denmark	7.555	1.351	1.590	0.868	0.683	0.284	0.408
4	Iceland	7.495	1.343	1.644	0.914	0.677	0.353	0.138
5	Switzerland	7.487	1.420	1.549	0.927	0.660	0.256	0.357
6	Netherlands	7.441	1.361	1.488	0.878	0.638	0.333	0.295
7	Canada	7.328	1.330	1.532	0.896	0.653	0.321	0.291
8	New Zealand	7.324	1.268	1.601	0.876	0.669	0.365	0.389
9	Sweden	7.314	1.355	1.501	0.913	0.659	0.285	0.383
10	Australia	7.272	1.340	1.573	0.910	0.647	0.361	0.302
11	Israel	7.190	1.244	1.433	0.888	0.464	0.262	0.082
12	Austria	7.139	1.341	1.504	0.891	0.617	0.242	0.224
13	Costa Rica	7.072	1.010	1.459	0.817	0.632	0.143	0.101
14	Ireland	6.977	1.448	1.583	0.876	0.614	0.307	0.306
15	Germany	6.965	1.340	1.474	0.861	0.586	0.273	0.280
16	Belgium	6.927	1.324	1.483	0.894	0.583	0.188	0.240
17	Luxembourg	6.910	1.576	1.520	0.896	0.632	0.196	0.321
18	United States	6.886	1.398	1.471	0.819	0.547	0.291	0.133
19	United Kingdom	6.814	1.301	1.559	0.883	0.533	0.354	0.272
20	United Arab Emirates	6.774	2.096	0.776	0.670	0.284	0.186	N/A
21	Czech Republic	6.711	1.233	1.489	0.854	0.543	0.064	0.034
22	Malta	6.627	1.270	1.525	0.884	0.645	0.376	0.142
23	France	6.489	1.293	1.466	0.908	0.520	0.098	0.176
24	Mexico	6.488	1.038	1.252	0.761	0.479	0.069	0.095
25	Chile	6.476	1.131	1.331	0.808	0.431	0.197	0.061
26	Taiwan	6.441	1.365	1.436	0.857	0.418	0.151	0.078
27	Panama	6.430	1.112	1.438	0.759	0.597	0.125	0.063
28	Brazil	6.419	0.986	1.474	0.675	0.493	0.110	0.088
29	Argentina	6.388	1.073	1.468	0.744	0.570	0.062	0.054
30	Guatemala	6.382	0.781	1.268	0.608	0.604	0.179	0.071
31	Uruguay	6.379	1.093	1.459	0.771	0.625	0.130	0.155
32	Qatar	6.374	1.649	1.303	0.748	0.654	0.256	0.171
33	Saudi Arabia	6.371	1.379	1.331	0.633	0.509	0.098	0.127
34	Singapore	6.343	1.529	1.451	1.008	0.631	0.261	0.457
35	Malaysia	6.322	1.161	1.258	0.669	0.356	0.311	0.059
36	Spain	6.310	1.251	1.538	0.965	0.449	0.142	0.074
37	Colombia	6.260	0.960	1.439	0.635	0.531	0.099	0.039
38	Trinidad & Tobago	6.192	1.223	1.492	0.564	0.575	0.171	0.019
39	Slovakia	6.173	1.210	1.537	0.776	0.354	0.118	0.014
40	El Salvador	6.167	0.806	1.231	0.639	0.461	0.065	0.082
41	Nicaragua	6.141	0.668	1.319	0.700	0.527	0.208	0.128
42	Poland	6.123	1.176	1.448	0.781	0.546	0.108	0.064
43	Bahrain	6.105	1.338	1.366	0.698	0.594	0.243	0.123
44	Uzbekistan	6.096	0.719	1.584	0.605	0.724	0.328	0.259
45	Kuwait	6.083	1.474	1.301	0.675	0.554	0.167	0.106
46	Thailand	6.072	1.016	1.417	0.707	0.637	0.364	0.029
47	Italy	6.000	1.264	1.501	0.946	0.281	0.137	0.028
48	Ecuador	5.973	0.889	1.330	0.736	0.556	0.114	0.120
49	Belize	5.956	0.807	1.101	0.474	0.593	0.183	0.089
50	Lithuania	5.952	1.197	1.527	0.716	0.350	0.026	0.006
51	Slovenia	5.948	1.219	1.506	0.856	0.633	0.160	0.051
52	Romania	5.945	1.116	1.219	0.726	0.528	0.088	0.001
53	Latvia	5.933	1.148	1.454	0.671	0.363	0.092	0.066
54	Japan	5.915	1.294	1.462	0.988	0.553	0.079	0.150
55	Mauritius	5.891	1.090	1.387	0.684	0.584	0.245	0.050
56	Jamaica	5.890	0.819	1.493	0.693	0.575	0.096	0.031
57	South Korea	5.875	1.266	1.204	0.955	0.244	0.175	0.051
58	Northern Cyprus	5.835	1.229	1.211	0.909	0.495	0.179	0.154
59	Russia	5.810	1.151	1.479	0.599	0.399	0.065	0.025
60	Kazakhstan	5.790	1.143	1.516	0.631	0.454	0.148	0.121
61	Cyprus	5.762	1.229	1.191	0.909	0.423	0.202	0.035
62	Bolivia	5.752	0.751	1.223	0.508	0.606	0.141	0.054
63	Estonia	5.739	1.200	1.532	0.737	0.553	0.086	0.174
64	Paraguay	5.681	0.835	1.522	0.615	0.541	0.162	0.074
65	Peru	5.663	0.934	1.249	0.674	0.530	0.092	0.034
66	Kosovo	5.662	0.855	1.230	0.578	0.448	0.274	0.023
67	Moldova	5.640	0.657	1.301	0.620	0.232	0.171	0.000
68	Turkmenistan	5.636	1.016	1.533	0.517	0.417	0.199	0.037
69	Hungary	5.620	1.171	1.401	0.732	0.259	0.061	0.022
70	Libya	5.566	0.985	1.350	0.553	0.496	0.116	0.148
71	Philippines	5.524	0.775	1.312	0.513	0.643	0.120	0.105
72	Honduras	5.504	0.620	1.205	0.622	0.459	0.197	0.074
73	Belarus	5.483	1.039	1.498	0.700	0.307	0.101	0.154
74	Turkey	5.483	1.148	1.380	0.686	0.324	0.106	0.109
75	Pakistan	5.472	0.652	0.810	0.424	0.334	0.216	0.113
76	Hong Kong	5.430	1.405	1.290	1.030	0.524	0.246	0.291
77	Portugal	5.410	1.188	1.429	0.884	0.562	0.055	0.017
78	Serbia	5.398	0.975	1.369	0.685	0.288	0.134	0.043
79	Greece	5.358	1.154	1.202	0.879	0.131	0.000	0.044
80	Lebanon	5.358	0.965	1.179	0.785	0.503	0.214	0.136
81	Montenegro	5.347	1.017	1.279	0.729	0.259	0.111	0.081
82	Croatia	5.321	1.115	1.161	0.737	0.380	0.120	0.039
83	Dominican Republic	5.302	0.982	1.441	0.614	0.578	0.120	0.106
84	Algeria	5.295	0.979	1.154	0.687	0.077	0.055	0.135
85	Morocco	5.254	0.779	0.797	0.669	0.460	0.026	0.074
86	China	5.246	0.989	1.142	0.799	0.597	0.029	0.103
87	Azerbaijan	5.201	1.024	1.161	0.603	0.430	0.031	0.176
88	Tajikistan	5.199	0.474	1.166	0.598	0.292	0.187	0.034
89	Republic of Macedonia	5.185	0.959	1.239	0.691	0.394	0.173	0.052
90	Jordan	5.161	0.822	1.265	0.645	0.468	0.130	0.134
91	Nigeria	5.155	0.689	1.172	0.048	0.462	0.201	0.032
92	Kyrgyzstan	5.131	0.530	1.416	0.594	0.540	0.281	0.035
93	Bosnia and Herzegovina	5.129	0.915	1.078	0.758	0.280	0.216	0.000
94	Mongolia	5.125	0.914	1.517	0.575	0.395	0.253	0.032
95	Vietnam	5.103	0.715	1.365	0.702	0.618	0.177	0.079
96	Indonesia	5.093	0.899	1.215	0.522	0.538	0.484	0.018
97	Bhutan	5.082	0.796	1.335	0.527	0.541	0.364	0.171
98	Somalia	4.982	0.000	0.712	0.115	0.674	0.238	0.282
99	Cameroon	4.975	0.535	0.891	0.182	0.454	0.183	0.043
100	Bulgaria	4.933	1.054	1.515	0.712	0.359	0.064	0.009
101	Nepal	4.880	0.425	1.228	0.539	0.526	0.302	0.078
102	Venezuela	4.806	0.996	1.469	0.657	0.133	0.056	0.052
103	Gabon	4.758	1.036	1.164	0.404	0.356	0.032	0.052
104	Palestinian Territories	4.743	0.642	1.217	0.602	0.266	0.086	0.076
105	South Africa	4.724	0.940	1.410	0.330	0.516	0.103	0.056
106	Iran	4.707	1.059	0.771	0.691	0.459	0.282	0.129
107	Ivory Coast	4.671	0.541	0.872	0.080	0.467	0.146	0.103
108	Ghana	4.657	0.592	0.896	0.337	0.499	0.212	0.029
109	Senegal	4.631	0.429	1.117	0.433	0.406	0.138	0.082
110	Laos	4.623	0.720	1.034	0.441	0.626	0.230	0.174
111	Tunisia	4.592	0.900	0.906	0.690	0.271	0.040	0.063
112	Albania	4.586	0.916	0.817	0.790	0.419	0.149	0.032
113	Sierra Leone	4.571	0.256	0.813	0.000	0.355	0.238	0.053
114	Congo (Brazzaville)	4.559	0.682	0.811	0.343	0.514	0.091	0.077
115	Bangladesh	4.500	0.532	0.850	0.579	0.580	0.153	0.144
116	Sri Lanka	4.471	0.918	1.314	0.672	0.585	0.307	0.050
117	Iraq	4.456	1.010	0.971	0.536	0.304	0.148	0.095
118	Mali	4.447	0.370	1.233	0.152	0.367	0.139	0.056
119	Namibia	4.441	0.874	1.281	0.365	0.519	0.051	0.064
120	Cambodia	4.433	0.549	1.088	0.457	0.696	0.256	0.065
121	Burkina Faso	4.424	0.314	1.097	0.254	0.312	0.175	0.128
122	Egypt	4.419	0.885	1.025	0.553	0.312	0.092	0.107
123	Mozambique	4.417	0.198	0.902	0.173	0.531	0.206	0.158
124	Kenya	4.410	0.493	1.048	0.454	0.504	0.352	0.055
125	Zambia	4.377	0.562	1.047	0.295	0.503	0.221	0.082
126	Mauritania	4.356	0.557	1.245	0.292	0.129	0.134	0.093
127	Ethiopia	4.350	0.308	0.950	0.391	0.452	0.220	0.146
128	Georgia	4.340	0.853	0.592	0.643	0.375	0.038	0.215
129	Armenia	4.321	0.816	0.990	0.666	0.260	0.077	0.028
130	Myanmar	4.308	0.682	1.174	0.429	0.580	0.598	0.178
131	Chad	4.301	0.358	0.907	0.053	0.189	0.181	0.060
132	Congo (Kinshasa)	4.245	0.069	1.136	0.204	0.312	0.197	0.052
133	India	4.190	0.721	0.747	0.485	0.539	0.172	0.093
134	Niger	4.166	0.131	0.867	0.221	0.390	0.175	0.099
135	Uganda	4.161	0.322	1.090	0.237	0.450	0.259	0.061
136	Benin	4.141	0.378	0.372	0.240	0.440	0.163	0.067
137	Sudan	4.139	0.605	1.240	0.312	0.016	0.134	0.082
138	Ukraine	4.103	0.793	1.413	0.609	0.163	0.187	0.011
139	Togo	3.999	0.259	0.474	0.253	0.434	0.158	0.101
140	Guinea	3.964	0.344	0.792	0.211	0.394	0.185	0.094
141	Lesotho	3.808	0.472	1.215	0.079	0.423	0.116	0.112
142	Angola	3.795	0.730	1.125	0.269	0.000	0.079	0.061
143	Madagascar	3.774	0.262	0.908	0.402	0.221	0.155	0.049
144	Zimbabwe	3.692	0.357	1.094	0.248	0.406	0.132	0.099
145	Afghanistan	3.632	0.332	0.537	0.255	0.085	0.191	0.036
146	Botswana	3.590	1.017	1.174	0.417	0.557	0.042	0.092
147	Malawi	3.587	0.186	0.541	0.306	0.531	0.210	0.080
148	Haiti	3.582	0.315	0.714	0.289	0.025	0.392	0.104
149	Liberia	3.495	0.076	0.858	0.267	0.419	0.206	0.030
150	Syria	3.462	0.689	0.382	0.539	0.088	0.376	0.144
151	Rwanda	3.408	0.332	0.896	0.400	0.636	0.200	0.444
152	Yemen	3.355	0.442	1.073	0.343	0.244	0.083	0.064
153	Tanzania	3.303	0.455	0.991	0.381	0.481	0.270	0.097
154	South Sudan	3.254	0.337	0.608	0.177	0.112	0.224	0.106
155	Central African Republic	3.083	0.024	0.000	0.010	0.305	0.218	0.038
156	Burundi	2.905	0.091	0.627	0.145	0.065	0.149	0.076

=== 2017 report ===
The 2017 report features the happiness score averaged over the years 2014–2016. For that timespan, Norway was the overall 'happiest' country in the world, even though oil prices had dropped. Close behind were Denmark, Iceland and Switzerland in a tight pack. Four of the top five countries follow the Nordic model. All the top ten countries had high scores in the six categories. The ranked follow-on countries in the top ten are: Finland, the Netherlands, Canada, New Zealand, Australia, and Sweden.

Table

Rank	Change in rank	Country	Life evaluation	Change in score	GDP per capita	Social support	Healthy life expectancy	Freedom to make life choices	Generosity	Trust	Residual
1	▲3	Norway	7.537	▲0.039	1.616	1.534	0.797	0.635	0.362	0.316	2.277
2	▼1	Denmark	7.522	▼0.004	1.482	1.551	0.793	0.626	0.355	0.401	2.314
3	Steady	Iceland	7.504	▲0.003	1.481	1.611	0.834	0.627	0.476	0.154	2.323
4	▼2	Switzerland	7.494	▼0.015	1.565	1.517	0.858	0.620	0.291	0.367	2.277
5	Steady	Finland	7.469	▲0.056	1.444	1.540	0.809	0.618	0.245	0.383	2.430
6	▲1	Netherlands	7.377	▲0.038	1.504	1.429	0.811	0.585	0.470	0.283	2.295
7	▼1	Canada	7.316	▼0.088	1.479	1.481	0.835	0.611	0.436	0.287	2.187
8	Steady	New Zealand	7.314	▼0.020	1.406	1.548	0.817	0.614	0.500	0.383	2.046
9	Steady	Australia	7.284	▼0.029	1.484	1.510	0.844	0.602	0.478	0.301	2.065
10	Steady	Sweden	7.284	▼0.007	1.494	1.478	0.831	0.613	0.385	0.384	2.098
11	Steady	Israel	7.213	▼0.054	1.375	1.376	0.838	0.406	0.330	0.085	2.802
12	▲2	Costa Rica	7.079	▼0.008	1.110	1.416	0.760	0.580	0.215	0.100	2.899
13	▼1	Austria	7.006	▼0.113	1.487	1.460	0.815	0.568	0.316	0.221	2.139
14	▼1	United States	6.993	▼0.111	1.546	1.420	0.774	0.506	0.393	0.136	2.218
15	▲4	Ireland	6.977	▲0.070	1.536	1.558	0.810	0.573	0.428	0.298	1.774
16	Steady	Germany	6.951	▼0.043	1.488	1.473	0.799	0.563	0.336	0.277	2.016
17	▲1	Belgium	6.891	▼0.038	1.464	1.462	0.818	0.540	0.232	0.251	2.124
18	▲2	Luxembourg	6.863	▼0.008	1.742	1.458	0.845	0.597	0.283	0.319	1.620
19	▲4	United Kingdom	6.714	▼0.011	1.442	1.496	0.805	0.508	0.493	0.265	1.704
20	▲4	Chile	6.652	▼0.053	1.253	1.284	0.819	0.377	0.327	0.082	2.510
21	▲7	United Arab Emirates	6.648	▲0.075	1.626	1.266	0.727	0.608	0.361	0.324	1.735
22	▼5	Brazil	6.635	▼0.317	1.107	1.431	0.617	0.437	0.162	0.111	2.769
23	▲4	Czech Republic	6.609	▲0.013	1.353	1.434	0.754	0.491	0.088	0.037	2.452
24	▲2	Argentina	6.599	▼0.051	1.185	1.440	0.695	0.495	0.109	0.060	2.614
25	▼4	Mexico	6.578	▼0.200	1.153	1.211	0.710	0.413	0.121	0.133	2.837
26	▼4	Singapore	6.572	▼0.167	1.692	1.354	0.949	0.550	0.346	0.464	1.216
27	▲3	Malta	6.527	▲0.039	1.343	1.488	0.822	0.589	0.575	0.153	1.557
28	▲1	Uruguay	6.454	▼0.091	1.218	1.412	0.719	0.579	0.175	0.178	2.172
29	▲10	Guatemala	6.454	▲0.130	0.872	1.256	0.540	0.531	0.283	0.077	2.894
30	▼5	Panama	6.452	▼0.249	1.234	1.373	0.706	0.550	0.211	0.071	2.307
31	▲1	France	6.442	▼0.036	1.431	1.388	0.844	0.470	0.130	0.173	2.006
32	▲1	Thailand	6.424	▼0.050	1.128	1.426	0.647	0.580	0.572	0.032	2.040
33	▲2	Taiwan	6.422	▲0.043	1.434	1.385	0.794	0.361	0.258	0.064	2.127
34	▲3	Spain	6.403	▲0.042	1.384	1.532	0.889	0.409	0.190	0.071	1.928
35	▲1	Qatar	6.375	Steady	1.871	1.274	0.710	0.604	0.330	0.439	1.145
36	▼5	Colombia	6.357	▼0.124	1.071	1.402	0.595	0.477	0.149	0.047	2.616
37	▼3	Saudi Arabia	6.344	▼0.035	1.531	1.287	0.590	0.450	0.148	0.273	2.065
38	▲5	Trinidad and Tobago	6.168	Steady	1.361	1.380	0.520	0.519	0.325	0.009	2.053
39	▲2	Kuwait	6.105	▼0.134	1.633	1.260	0.632	0.496	0.228	0.215	1.640
40	▲5	Slovakia	6.098	▲0.020	1.325	1.505	0.713	0.296	0.137	0.024	2.098
41	▲1	Bahrain	6.087	▼0.131	1.488	1.323	0.653	0.537	0.173	0.257	1.656
42	▲5	Malaysia	6.084	▲0.079	1.291	1.285	0.619	0.402	0.417	0.066	2.004
—	—	Europe (Note: Score not included in the original report, but was attained by adding up Europe's scores and then dividing for an average: 6.08044.)	6.080	N/A	N/A	N/A	N/A	N/A	N/A	N/A	N/A
43	▲5	Nicaragua	6.071	▲0.079	0.737	1.287	0.653	0.448	0.302	0.131	2.514
44	▲7	Ecuador	6.008	▲0.032	1.001	1.286	0.686	0.455	0.150	0.140	2.290
45	▲1	El Salvador	6.003	▼0.065	0.910	1.182	0.596	0.432	0.078	0.090	2.715
46	▲11	Poland	5.973	▲0.138	1.292	1.446	0.699	0.520	0.158	0.059	1.798
47	▲2	Uzbekistan	5.971	▼0.016	0.786	1.549	0.498	0.658	0.416	0.247	1.817
48	▲2	Italy	5.964	▼0.013	1.395	1.445	0.853	0.256	0.173	0.028	1.813
49	▲7	Russia	5.963	▲0.107	1.282	1.469	0.547	0.374	0.052	0.033	2.206
50	▲2	Belize	5.956	Steady	0.908	1.081	0.450	0.548	0.240	0.097	2.632
51	▲2	Japan	5.920	▼0.001	1.417	1.436	0.913	0.506	0.121	0.164	1.363
52	▲8	Lithuania	5.902	▲0.089	1.315	1.474	0.629	0.234	0.010	0.012	2.228
53	▼15	Algeria	5.872	▼0.483	1.092	1.146	0.618	0.233	0.069	0.146	2.568
54	▲14	Latvia	5.850	▲0.290	1.261	1.405	0.639	0.326	0.153	0.074	1.994
55	Steady	Moldova	5.838	▼0.059	0.729	1.252	0.589	0.241	0.209	0.010	2.808
56	▲2	South Korea	5.838	▲0.003	1.402	1.128	0.900	0.258	0.207	0.063	1.880
57	▲14	Romania	5.825	▲0.297	1.218	1.150	0.685	0.457	0.134	0.004	2.177
58	▲1	Bolivia	5.823	▲0.001	0.834	1.228	0.474	0.559	0.226	0.060	2.443
59	▲6	Turkmenistan	5.822	▲0.164	1.131	1.493	0.438	0.418	0.250	0.259	1.833
60	▼6	Kazakhstan	5.819	▼0.100	1.285	1.384	0.606	0.437	0.202	0.119	1.785
61	▲1	Northern Cyprus	5.810	▲0.039	1.347	1.186	0.835	0.471	0.267	0.155	1.549
62	▲1	Slovenia	5.758	▼0.010	1.341	1.453	0.791	0.573	0.243	0.045	1.313
63	▲1	Peru	5.715	▼0.028	1.035	1.219	0.630	0.450	0.127	0.047	2.207
64	▲2	Mauritius	5.629	▼0.019	1.189	1.210	0.638	0.491	0.361	0.042	1.698
65	▲4	Cyprus	5.621	▲0.075	1.356	1.131	0.845	0.355	0.271	0.041	1.621
66	▲6	Estonia	5.611	▲0.094	1.321	1.477	0.695	0.479	0.099	0.183	1.358
67	▼6	Belarus	5.569	▼0.233	1.157	1.445	0.638	0.295	0.155	0.156	1.723
68	▼1	Libya	5.525	▼0.090	1.102	1.358	0.520	0.466	0.152	0.093	1.835
69	▲9	Turkey	5.500	▲0.111	1.198	1.338	0.638	0.301	0.047	0.100	1.879
70	Steady	Paraguay	5.493	▼0.045	0.933	1.507	0.579	0.474	0.224	0.091	1.685
71	▲4	Hong Kong	5.472	▲0.014	1.552	1.263	0.943	0.491	0.374	0.294	0.555
72	▲10	Philippines	5.430	▲0.151	0.858	1.254	0.468	0.585	0.194	0.099	1.973
73	▲13	Serbia	5.395	▲0.218	1.069	1.258	0.651	0.209	0.220	0.041	1.947
74	▲6	Jordan	5.336	▲0.033	0.991	1.239	0.605	0.418	0.172	0.120	1.791
75	▲16	Hungary	5.324	▲0.179	1.286	1.343	0.688	0.176	0.078	0.037	1.716
76	▼3	Jamaica	5.311	▼0.199	0.926	1.368	0.641	0.474	0.234	0.055	1.612
—	—	World	5.305 (Note: Score not included in the original report, but was attained by adding up all the scores and then dividing for an average: 5.3053935483871.)	N/A	N/A	N/A	N/A	N/A	N/A	N/A	N/A
77	▼3	Croatia	5.293	▼0.195	1.223	0.968	0.701	0.256	0.248	0.043	1.854
78	▼1	Kosovo	5.279	▼0.122	0.951	1.138	0.541	0.260	0.320	0.057	2.011
79	▲4	China	5.273	▲0.028	1.081	1.161	0.741	0.473	0.029	0.023	1.765
80	▲12	Pakistan	5.269	▲0.137	0.727	0.673	0.402	0.235	0.315	0.124	2.792
81	▼2	Indonesia	5.262	▼0.052	0.996	1.274	0.492	0.443	0.612	0.015	1.429
82	▼38	Venezuela	5.250	▼0.834	1.128	1.431	0.617	0.154	0.065	0.064	1.789
83	▲5	Montenegro	5.237	▲0.076	1.121	1.238	0.667	0.195	0.198	0.088	1.729
84	▲6	Morocco	5.235	▲0.084	0.878	0.775	0.598	0.408	0.032	0.088	2.456
85	▼4	Azerbaijan	7.342	▼0.057	1.154	1.152	0.541	0.398	0.045	0.181	1.762
86	▲3	Dominican Republic	5.230	▲0.075	1.079	1.402	0.575	0.553	0.187	0.114	1.319
87	▲12	Greece	5.227	▲0.194	1.289	1.239	0.810	0.096	0.000	0.043	1.749
88	▲5	Lebanon	5.225	▲0.096	1.075	1.130	0.735	0.289	0.264	0.038	1.695
89	▲5	Portugal	5.195	▲0.072	1.315	1.367	0.796	0.498	0.095	0.016	1.108
90	▼3	Bosnia and Herzegovina	5.182	▲0.019	0.982	1.069	0.705	0.204	0.329	0.000	1.892
91	▲13	Honduras	5.181	▲0.310	0.731	1.144	0.583	0.348	0.236	0.073	2.066
92	▲3	Republic of Macedonia	5.175	▲0.054	1.065	1.208	0.645	0.326	0.254	0.060	1.617
93	▼17	Somalia	5.151	▼0.289	0.023	0.721	0.114	0.602	0.292	0.282	3.117
94	▲2	Vietnam	5.074	▲0.013	0.789	1.277	0.652	0.571	0.235	0.088	1.462
95	▲8	Nigeria	5.074	▲0.199	0.784	1.216	0.057	0.395	0.231	0.026	2.365
96	▲4	Tajikistan	5.041	▲0.045	0.525	1.271	0.529	0.472	0.249	0.146	1.849
97	▼13	Bhutan	5.011	▼0.185	0.885	1.340	0.496	0.502	0.474	0.173	1.140
98	▼13	Kyrgyzstan	5.004	▼0.181	0.596	1.394	0.553	0.455	0.429	0.039	1.537
99	▲8	Nepal	4.962	▲0.169	0.480	1.179	0.504	0.440	0.394	0.073	1.891
100	▲1	Mongolia	4.955	▲0.048	1.027	1.493	0.558	0.394	0.338	0.033	1.111
101	▲15	South Africa	4.829	▲0.370	1.055	1.385	0.187	0.479	0.139	0.073	1.511
102	▼4	Tunisia	4.805	▼0.240	1.007	0.868	0.613	0.290	0.050	0.087	1.890
103	▲5	Palestinian Territories	4.775	▲0.021	0.716	1.156	0.566	0.255	0.114	0.089	1.879
104	▲16	Egypt	4.735	▲0.373	0.990	0.997	0.520	0.282	0.129	0.114	1.702
105	▲24	Bulgaria	4.714	▲0.497	1.161	1.434	0.708	0.289	0.113	0.011	0.996
106	▲5	Sierra Leone	4.709	▲0.074	0.368	0.984	0.006	0.319	0.293	0.071	2.668
107	▲7	Cameroon	4.695	▲0.182	0.564	0.946	0.133	0.430	0.236	0.051	2.334
108	▼3	Iran	4.692	▼0.121	1.157	0.712	0.639	0.249	0.387	0.049	1.499
109	Steady	Albania	4.644	▼0.011	0.996	0.804	0.731	0.381	0.201	0.040	1.490
110	Steady	Bangladesh	4.608	▼0.035	0.587	0.735	0.533	0.478	0.172	0.124	1.979
111	▲2	Namibia	4.574	Steady	0.964	1.098	0.339	0.520	0.077	0.093	1.482
112	▲10	Kenya	4.553	▲0.197	0.560	1.068	0.310	0.453	0.445	0.065	1.652
113	N/A	Mozambique	4.550	N/A	0.234	0.871	0.107	0.481	0.322	0.179	2.356
114	▲5	Myanmar	4.545	▲0.150	0.367	1.123	0.398	0.514	0.838	0.189	1.115
115	▲13	Senegal	4.535	▲0.316	0.479	1.180	0.409	0.378	0.183	0.115	1.790
116	▼10	Zambia	4.514	▼0.281	0.636	1.003	0.258	0.462	0.250	0.078	1.827
117	▼5	Iraq	4.497	▼0.078	1.103	0.979	0.501	0.289	0.200	0.107	1.319
118	▲16	Gabon	4.465	▲0.344	1.198	1.156	0.357	0.312	0.044	0.076	1.323
119	▼4	Ethiopia	4.460	▼0.048	0.339	0.865	0.353	0.409	0.313	0.165	2.016
120	▼3	Sri Lanka	4.440	▲0.025	1.010	1.260	0.625	0.561	0.491	0.074	0.419
121	Steady	Armenia	4.376	▲0.016	0.901	1.007	0.638	0.198	0.083	0.027	1.521
122	▼4	India	4.315	▼0.089	0.792	0.754	0.455	0.470	0.232	0.092	1.519
123	▲7	Mauritania	4.292	▲0.091	0.648	1.272	0.285	0.096	0.202	0.137	1.652
124	▲1	Congo (Brazzaville)	4.291	▲0.019	0.809	0.832	0.290	0.435	0.121	0.080	1.724
125	▲1	Georgia	4.286	▲0.034	0.951	0.571	0.650	0.309	0.054	0.252	1.500
126	▲1	Congo (Kinshasa)	4.280	▲0.044	0.092	1.229	0.191	0.236	0.246	0.060	2.225
127	▲8	Mali	4.190	▲0.117	0.476	1.281	0.169	0.307	0.183	0.105	1.668
128	▲11	Ivory Coast	4.180	▲0.264	0.603	0.905	0.049	0.448	0.201	0.130	1.845
129	▲11	Cambodia	4.168	▲0.261	0.602	1.006	0.430	0.633	0.386	0.068	1.043
130	▲3	Sudan	4.139	Steady	0.660	1.214	0.291	0.015	0.182	0.090	1.687
131	▼7	Ghana	4.120	▼0.156	0.667	0.874	0.296	0.423	0.257	0.025	1.578
132	▼9	Ukraine	4.096	▼0.228	0.895	1.395	0.576	0.123	0.270	0.023	0.814
133	▲13	Uganda	4.081	▲0.342	0.381	1.130	0.218	0.443	0.326	0.057	1.526
134	▲11	Burkina Faso	4.032	▲0.293	0.350	1.043	0.216	0.324	0.251	0.120	1.727
135	▲7	Niger	4.028	▲0.172	0.162	0.993	0.269	0.364	0.229	0.139	1.874
136	▼4	Malawi	3.970	▼0.186	0.233	0.513	0.315	0.467	0.287	0.073	2.082
137	▲7	Chad	3.936	▲0.173	0.438	0.954	0.041	0.162	0.216	0.054	2.071
138	▼7	Zimbabwe	3.875	▼0.318	0.376	1.083	0.197	0.336	0.189	0.095	1.598
139	N/A	Lesotho	3.808	N/A	0.521	1.190	0.000	0.391	0.157	0.119	1.430
140	▲1	Angola	3.795	▼0.071	0.858	1.104	0.050	0.000	0.098	0.070	1.614
141	▲13	Afghanistan	3.794	▲0.434	0.401	0.582	0.181	0.106	0.312	0.061	2.151
142	▼5	Botswana	3.766	▼0.208	1.122	1.222	0.342	0.505	0.099	0.099	0.378
143	▲10	Benin	3.657	▲0.173	0.431	0.435	0.210	0.426	0.208	0.061	1.886
144	▲4	Madagascar	3.644	▼0.051	0.306	0.913	0.375	0.189	0.209	0.067	1.585
145	▼9	Haiti	3.603	▼0.425	0.369	0.640	0.277	0.030	0.489	0.100	1.697
146	▲1	Yemen	3.593	▼0.131	0.592	0.935	0.310	0.249	0.104	0.057	1.346
147	▼4	South Sudan	3.591	▼0.241	0.397	0.601	0.163	0.147	0.286	0.117	1.880
148	▲2	Liberia	3.533	▼0.089	0.119	0.872	0.230	0.333	0.267	0.039	1.673
149	▲2	Guinea	3.507	▼0.100	0.245	0.791	0.194	0.349	0.265	0.111	1.552
150	▲5	Togo	3.495	▲0.192	0.305	0.432	0.247	0.380	0.197	0.096	1.837
151	▲1	Rwanda	3.471	▼0.044	0.369	0.946	0.326	0.582	0.253	0.455	0.540
152	▲4	Syria	3.462	▲0.393	0.777	0.396	0.501	0.082	0.494	0.151	1.062
153	▼4	Tanzania	3.349	▼0.317	0.511	1.042	0.365	0.390	0.354	0.066	0.621
154	▲3	Burundi	2.905	Steady	0.092	0.630	0.152	0.060	0.204	0.084	1.683
155	N/A	Central African Republic	2.693	N/A	0.000	0.000	0.019	0.271	0.281	0.057	2.066

=== 2016 report ===
The 2016 report features the happiness score averaged over the years 2013–2015.

Table

Legend:

Explained by: GDP per capita
Explained by: Social support
Explained by: Healthy life expectancy
Explained by: Freedom to make life choices
Explained by: Generosity
Trust or absence of corruption, as explained by the publicly perceived absence of corruption in government and business

Italics: States with limited recognition and disputed territories

Rank	Country	Life evaluation	Change from prior year	GDP per capita	Social support	Healthy life expectancy	Freedom to make life choices	Generosity	Trust
1	Denmark	7.526	▼ -0.401						
2	Switzerland	7.509	▲0.035						
3	Iceland	7.501	0.000						
4	Norway	7.498	▲0.082						
5	Finland	7.413	▼ -0.259						
6	Canada	7.404	▼ -0.041						
7	Netherlands	7.339	▼ -0.119						
8	New Zealand	7.334	▼ -0.097						
9	Australia	7.313	▲0.002						
10	Sweden	7.291	▼ -0.017						
11	Israel	7.267	▲0.258						
12	Austria	7.119	▼ -0.003						
13	United States	7.104	▼ -0.261						
14	Costa Rica	7.087	▼ -0.171						
15	Puerto Rico	7.039	▲0.446						
16	Germany	6.994	▲0.486						
17	Brazil	6.952	▲0.474						
18	Belgium	6.929	▼ -0.311						
19	Ireland	6.907	▼ -0.238						
20	Luxembourg	6.871	0.000						
21	Mexico	6.778	▲0.225						
22	Singapore	6.739	▲0.099						
23	United Kingdom	6.725	▼ -0.161						
24	Chile	6.705	▲0.826						
25	Panama	6.701	▲0.191						
26	Argentina	6.650	▲0.457						
27	Czech Republic	6.596	▲0.126						
28	United Arab Emirates	6.573	▼ -0.161						
29	Uruguay	6.545	▲0.804						
30	Malta	6.488	0.000						
31	Colombia	6.481	▲0.399						
32	France	6.478	▼ -0.336						
33	Thailand	6.474	▲0.631						
34	Saudi Arabia	6.379	▼ -0.794						
35	Taiwan	6.379	▲0.190						
36	Qatar	6.375	0.000						
37	Spain	6.361	▼ -0.711						
38	Algeria	6.355	0.000						
39	Guatemala	6.324	▲0.211						
40	Suriname	6.269	0.000						
41	Kuwait	6.239	▲0.164						
42	Bahrain	6.218	0.000						
43	Trinidad and Tobago	6.168	▲0.336						
44	Venezuela	6.084	▼ -0.762						
45	Slovakia	6.078	▲0.814						
46	El Salvador	6.068	▲0.572						
47	Malaysia	6.005	▼ -0.132						
48	Nicaragua	5.992	▲1.285						
49	Uzbekistan	5.987	▲0.755						
50	Italy	5.977	▼ -0.735						
51	Ecuador	5.976	▲0.966						
52	Belize	5.956	▼ -0.495						
53	Japan	5.921	▼ -0.446						
54	Kazakhstan	5.919	▲0.322						
55	Moldova	5.897	▲0.959						
56	Russia	5.856	▲0.738						
57	Poland	5.835	▲0.098						
58	South Korea	5.835	▲0.295						
59	Bolivia	5.822	▲0.322						
60	Lithuania	5.813	▼ -0.069						
61	Belarus	5.802	▲0.165						
62	Northern Cyprus	5.771	0.000						
63	Slovenia	5.768	▼ -0.044						
64	Peru	5.743	▲0.730						
65	Turkmenistan	5.658	0.000						
66	Mauritius	5.648	0.000						
67	Libya	5.615	0.000						
68	Latvia	5.560	▲0.872						
69	Cyprus	5.546	▼ -0.692						
70	Paraguay	5.538	▲0.536						
71	Romania	5.528	▲0.310						
72	Estonia	5.517	▲0.165						
73	Jamaica	5.510	▼ -0.698						
74	Croatia	5.488	▼ -0.333						
75	Hong Kong	5.458	▼ -0.053						
76	Somalia	5.440	0.000						
77	Kosovo	5.401	▲0.298						
78	Turkey	5.389	▲0.216						
79	Indonesia	5.314	▲0.295						
80	Jordan	5.303	▼ -0.638						
81	Azerbaijan	5.291	▲0.642						
82	Philippines	5.279	▲0.425						
83	China	5.245	▲0.525						
84	Bhutan	5.196	0.000						
85	Kyrgyzstan	5.185	▲0.515						
86	Serbia	5.177	▲0.426						
87	Bosnia and Herzegovina	5.163	▲0.263						
88	Montenegro	5.161	▼ -0.035						
89	Dominican Republic	5.155	▲0.070						
90	Morocco	5.151	0.000						
91	Hungary	5.145	▲0.070						
92	Pakistan	5.132	▼ -0.374						
93	Lebanon	5.129	▲0.059						
94	Portugal	5.123	▼ -0.282						
95	North Macedonia	5.121	▲0.627						
96	Vietnam	5.061	▼ -0.299						
97	Somaliland region	5.057	0.000						
98	Tunisia	5.045	0.000						
99	Greece	5.033	▼ -1.294						
100	Tajikistan	4.996	▲0.474						
101	Mongolia	4.907	▲0.298						
102	Laos	4.876	▼ -0.344						
103	Nigeria	4.875	▲0.075						
104	Honduras	4.871	▼ -0.375						
105	Iran	4.813	▼ -0.507						
106	Zambia	4.795	▲0.381						
107	Nepal	4.793	▲0.135						
108	(Palestine) Palestinian Territories	4.754	▲0.321						
109	Albania	4.655	▲0.021						
110	Bangladesh	4.643	▲0.170						
111	Sierra Leone	4.635	▲1.028						
112	Iraq	4.575	0.000						
113	Namibia	4.574	▼ -0.312						
114	Cameroon	4.513	▲0.413						
115	Ethiopia	4.508	0.000						
116	South Africa	4.459	▼ -0.686						
117	Sri Lanka	4.415	▲0.037						
118	India	4.404	▼ -0.750						
119	Myanmar	4.395	0.000						
120	Egypt	4.362	▼ -0.996						
121	Armenia	4.360	▼ -0.226						
122	Kenya	4.356	▼ -0.044						
123	Ukraine	4.324	▼ -0.701						
124	Ghana	4.276	▼ -0.600						
125	Republic of the Congo	4.272	0.000						
126	Georgia	4.252	▲0.561						
127	Democratic Republic of the Congo	4.236	0.000						
128	Senegal	4.219	▼ -0.328						
129	Bulgaria	4.217	▲0.373						
130	Mauritania	4.201	▲0.052						
131	Zimbabwe	4.193	▲0.639						
132	Malawi	4.156	▼ -0.205						
133	Sudan	4.139	0.000						
134	Gabon	4.121	0.000						
135	Mali	4.073	▲0.059						
136	Haiti	4.028	▲0.274						
137	Botswana	3.974	▼ -0.765						
138	Comoros	3.956	0.000						
139	Ivory Coast	3.916	0.000						
140	Cambodia	3.907	▲0.045						
141	Angola	3.866	0.000						
142	Niger	3.856	▼ -0.144						
143	South Sudan	3.832	0.000						
144	Chad	3.763	▼ -0.025						
145	Burkina Faso	3.739	▼ -0.170						
146	Uganda	3.739	▼ -0.356						
147	Yemen	3.724	▼ -0.754						
148	Madagascar	3.695	▼ -0.285						
149	Tanzania	3.666	▼ -0.460						
150	Liberia	3.622	▼ -0.080						
151	Guinea	3.607	0.000						
152	Rwanda	3.515	▼ -0.700						
153	Benin	3.484	▲0.154						
154	Afghanistan	3.360	0.000						
155	Togo	3.303	▲0.100						
156	Syria	3.069	0.000						
157	Burundi	2.905	0.000						

=== 2013 report ===
The 2013 report features the happiness score averaged over the years 2010–2012.

Table

Rank	Country	Life evaluation
1	Denmark	7.693
2	Norway	7.655
3	Switzerland	7.650
4	Netherlands	7.512
5	Sweden	7.480
6	Canada	7.477
7	Finland	7.389
8	Austria	7.369
9	Iceland	7.355
10	Australia	7.350
11	Israel	7.301
12	Costa Rica	7.257
13	New Zealand	7.221
14	United Arab Emirates	7.144
15	Panama	7.143
16	Mexico	7.088
17	United States	7.082
18	Ireland	7.076
19	Luxembourg	7.054
20	Venezuela	7.039
21	Belgium	6.967
22	United Kingdom	6.883
23	Oman	6.853
24	Brazil	6.849
25	France	6.764
26	Germany	6.672
27	Qatar	6.666
28	Chile	6.587
29	Argentina	6.562
30	Singapore	6.546
31	Trinidad and Tobago	6.519
32	Kuwait	6.515
33	Saudi Arabia	6.480
34	Cyprus	6.466
35	Colombia	6.416
36	Thailand	6.371
37	Uruguay	6.355
38	Spain	6.322
39	Czech Republic	6.290
40	Suriname	6.269
41	South Korea	6.267
42	Taiwan	6.221
43	Japan	6.064
44	Slovenia	6.060
45	Italy	6.021
46	Slovakia	5.969
47	Guatemala	5.965
48	Malta	5.964
49	Ecuador	5.865
50	Bolivia	5.857
51	Poland	5.822
52	El Salvador	5.809
53	Moldova	5.791
54	Paraguay	5.779
55	Peru	5.776
56	Malaysia	5.760
57	Kazakhstan	5.671
58	Croatia	5.661
59	Turkmenistan	5.628
60	Uzbekistan	5.623
61	Angola	5.589
62	Albania	5.550
63	Vietnam	5.533
64	Hong Kong	5.523
65	Nicaragua	5.507
66	Belarus	5.504
67	Mauritius	5.477
68	Russia	5.464
69	Northern Cyprus	5.463
70	Greece	5.435
71	Lithuania	5.426
72	Estonia	5.426
73	Algeria	5.422
74	Jordan	5.414
75	Jamaica	5.374
76	Indonesia	5.348
77	Turkey	5.345
78	Libya	5.340
79	Bahrain	5.312
80	Montenegro	5.299
81	Pakistan	5.292
82	Nigeria	5.248
83	Kosovo	5.222
84	Honduras	5.142
85	Portugal	5.101

== Happiness of the young and old ==
Country rankings for the young and the old are quite different, and systematically so, underscoring the fact that convergence between the two halves of Europe has been driven mainly by the rising happiness of the young. Countries ranking highest for the old are generally countries with high overall rankings, but include several where the young have recently fared very poorly.

Country rankings for the under-30s (2021–2023)

Overall rank	Country or region	Life evaluation
1	Lithuania	7.759
2	Israel	7.667
3	Serbia	7.658
4	Iceland	7.598
5	Denmark	7.329
6	Luxembourg	7.301
7	Finland	7.300
8	Romania	7.284
9	Netherlands	7.248
10	Czech Republic	7.198
11	Costa Rica	7.150
12	Austria	7.142
13	Switzerland	7.138
14	Croatia	7.116
15	Slovenia	7.111
16	Kuwait	7.104
17	El Salvador	7.057
18	Sweden	7.026
19	Australia	7.013
20	Norway	6.995
21	Ireland	6.954
22	Mexico	6.954
23	Kosovo	6.949
24	Belgium	6.947
25	Taiwan	6.908
26	Panama	6.883
27	New Zealand	6.859
28	Nicaragua	6.789
29	Moldova	6.786
30	Uruguay	6.775
31	Latvia	6.766
32	United Kingdom	6.754
33	Bosnia and Herzegovina	6.746
34	Argentina	6.746
35	United Arab Emirates	6.732
36	Hungary	6.720
37	Paraguay	6.715
38	Slovakia	6.674
39	Chile	6.662
40	Bulgaria	6.621
41	Italy	6.618
42	Saudi Arabia	6.617
43	Poland	6.605
44	Estonia	6.599
45	Thailand	6.597
46	Portugal	6.588
47	Germany	6.578
48	France	6.561
49	Guatemala	6.548
50	Montenegro	6.536
51	Cyprus	6.525
52	South Korea	6.503
53	Greece	6.502
54	Singapore	6.484
55	Spain	6.463
56	Honduras	6.462
57	Malta	6.452
58	Canada	6.439
59	Ecuador	6.437
60	Brazil	6.436
61	Dominican Republic	6.407
62	United States	6.392
63	Peru	6.382
64	Malaysia	6.372
65	Vietnam	6.363
66	Albania	6.358
67	North Macedonia	6.329
68	Russia	6.328
69	Kazakhstan	6.324
70	Philippines	6.305
71	Uzbekistan	6.283
72	Armenia	6.245
73	Japan	6.232
74	Bolivia	6.157
75	Indonesia	6.089
76	Colombia	6.035
77	Bahrain	6.034
78	Georgia	6.031
79	China	5.949
80	Libya	5.937
81	Kyrgyzstan	5.935
82	Ukraine	5.907
83	Venezuela	5.896
84	Jamaica	5.826
85	Mauritius	5.791
86	Mongolia	5.758
87	South Africa	5.650
88	Congo (Brazzaville)	5.574
89	Tajikistan	5.500
90	Iraq	5.486
91	Gabon	5.477
92	Nepal	5.467
93	Algeria	5.379
94	Mozambique	5.352
95	Azerbaijan	5.352
96	Iran	5.331
97	Hong Kong	5.329
98	Morocco	5.281
99	Senegal	5.266
100	Ivory Coast	5.251
101	Turkey	5.173
102	Palestine	5.120
103	Guinea	5.106
104	Laos	5.091
105	Namibia	5.089
106	Cameroon	4.996
107	Pakistan	4.949
108	Nigeria	4.906
109	Kenya	4.906
110	Gambia	4.735
111	Uganda	4.718
112	Cambodia	4.699
113	Liberia	4.670
114	Jordan	4.667
115	Benin	4.665
116	Niger	4.616
117	Burkina Faso	4.601
118	Tunisia	4.560
119	Mauritania	4.517
120	Chad	4.462
121	Ghana	4.426
122	Myanmar	4.354
123	Sri Lanka	4.339
124	Madagascar	4.334
125	Mali	4.332
126	Togo	4.323
127	India	4.281
128	Bangladesh	4.200
129	Tanzania	4.161
130	Egypt	4.126
131	Ethiopia	4.125
132	Comoros	4.111
133	Botswana	4.012
134	Eswatini	3.894
135	Yemen	3.822
136	Zambia	3.794
137	Malawi	3.710
138	Lesotho	3.700
139	Zimbabwe	3.661
140	Congo (Kinshasa)	3.441
141	Sierra Leone	3.225
142	Lebanon	2.997
143	Afghanistan	1.827

Country rankings for the over-60s (2021–2023)

Overall rank	Country or region	Life evaluation
1	Denmark	7.916
2	Finland	7.912
3	Norway	7.660
4	Sweden	7.588
5	Iceland	7.585
6	New Zealand	7.390
7	Netherlands	7.360
8	Canada	7.343
9	Australia	7.304
10	United States	7.258
11	United Arab Emirates	7.248
12	Luxembourg	7.214
13	Kuwait	7.154
14	Switzerland	7.084
15	Austria	6.939
16	Ireland	6.932
17	Costa Rica	6.932
18	Israel	6.854
19	Belgium	6.842
20	United Kingdom	6.812
21	Germany	6.734
22	Uzbekistan	6.633
23	Czech Republic	6.591
24	Uruguay	6.561
25	France	6.524
26	Singapore	6.477
27	Saudi Arabia	6.431
28	Mauritius	6.388
29	Spain	6.363
30	China	6.359
31	Malta	6.353
32	Slovenia	6.310
33	Mexico	6.287
34	Taiwan	6.284
35	Estonia	6.164
36	Japan	6.146
37	Brazil	6.124
38	Italy	6.119
39	Kosovo	6.096
40	Poland	6.051
41	Thailand	6.001
42	Kazakhstan	6.000
43	Philippines	5.976
44	Lithuania	5.965
45	Argentina	5.948
46	Chile	5.946
47	Nicaragua	5.904
48	Romania	5.902
49	Guatemala	5.887
50	Libya	5.835
51	Latvia	5.811
52	El Salvador	5.716
53	Mongolia	5.701
54	Serbia	5.696
55	Kyrgyzstan	5.687
56	Panama	5.687
57	Cyprus	5.665
58	Honduras	5.645
59	South Korea	5.642
60	Slovakia	5.641
61	Bahrain	5.640
62	Algeria	5.631
63	Portugal	5.571
64	Venezuela	5.570
65	Bolivia	5.565
66	Russia	5.544
67	Greece	5.534
68	Jamaica	5.529
69	Vietnam	5.521
70	Hungary	5.474
71	Malaysia	5.418
72	Colombia	5.393
73	Peru	5.313
74	Hong Kong	5.297
75	Dominican Republic	5.269
76	Nepal	5.259
77	Laos	5.256
78	Bosnia and Herzegovina	5.241
79	Indonesia	5.159
80	Croatia	5.137
81	Guinea	5.128
82	South Africa	5.083
83	Paraguay	5.013
84	Ecuador	4.927
85	Congo (Brazzaville)	4.918
86	Moldova	4.896
87	Tajikistan	4.888
88	Armenia	4.865
89	Mozambique	4.804
90	Bulgaria	4.775
91	Georgia	4.719
92	Turkey	4.694
93	Mauritania	4.691
94	Chad	4.689
95	Iraq	4.684
96	Ivory Coast	4.682
97	Montenegro	4.674
98	North Macedonia	4.658
99	Palestine	4.643
100	Albania	4.643
101	Niger	4.634
102	Myanmar	4.626
103	Iran	4.596
104	Liberia	4.534
105	Burkina Faso	4.505
106	Gabon	4.457
107	Cameroon	4.428
108	Azerbaijan	4.417
109	Madagascar	4.416
110	Cambodia	4.401
111	Senegal	4.366
112	Gambia	4.346
113	Morocco	4.293
114	Namibia	4.285
115	Ukraine	4.279
116	Mali	4.211
117	Benin	4.206
118	Tunisia	4.167
119	Kenya	4.134
120	Bangladesh	4.124
121	India	4.095
122	Pakistan	4.030
123	Jordan	4.024
124	Egypt	3.969
125	Ghana	3.839
126	Tanzania	3.826
127	Togo	3.790
128	Sri Lanka	3.772
129	Yemen	3.740
130	Nigeria	3.720
131	Ethiopia	3.563
132	Malawi	3.498
133	Sierra Leone	3.471
134	Uganda	3.403
135	Comoros	3.305
136	Eswatini	3.075
137	Zimbabwe	3.021
138	Lesotho	2.808
139	Congo (Kinshasa)	2.703
140	Botswana	2.528
141	Lebanon	2.490
142	Zambia	2.484
143	Afghanistan	1.456

== Annual report topics ==
The World Happiness Report has been published every year since 2012 (except for 2014).

In addition to ranking countries' happiness and well-being levels, each report has contributing authors and most focus on a particular theme. The data used to rank countries in each report is drawn from the Gallup World Poll, as well as other sources such as the World Values Survey, in some of the reports. The Gallup World Poll questionnaire measures 14 areas within its core questions: (1) business & economic, (2) citizen engagement, (3) communications & technology, (4) diversity (social issues), (5) education & families, (6) emotions (well-being), (7) environment & energy, (8) food & shelter, (9) government and politics, (10) law & order (safety), (11) health, (12) religion & ethics, (13) transportation, and (14) work.

2025 World Happiness Report

The 2025 World Happiness Report focused on the theme of "Caring and Sharing" and its impact on global well-being. It highlighted the positive correlation between caring behaviours and happiness, emphasizing the importance of social connections and also community life. It is also the first Report that provides a breakdown of cost-effectiveness among charities, again using WELLBYs.

2024 World Happiness Report

The 2024 World Happiness Report focused on happiness at different stages of life. Chapter 3 presents global data on child and adolescent wellbeing, whereas Chapters 4 and 5 focus on older age, covering the links between wellbeing and dementia and a deep dive into the well being of older people in India.

2023 World Happiness Report

The 2023 World Happiness Report was a triannual analysis of 2020–2022, heavily influenced by COVID-19 and other significant challenges.

For the sixth consecutive year, Finland was ranked on top, followed by Denmark, Iceland, Israel and the Netherlands. In the top-10 rankings, Israel jumped five places, while Switzerland fell four places. Lithuania was the only new country in the top-20.

2022 World Happiness Report

The 2022 World Happiness Report included a section looking at possible genetic effects on individual happiness.

Finland is in the top position in the world happiness report in 2022. Followed by Denmark and Iceland in second and third place. Switzerland, Netherlands, Luxembourg, Sweden, Norway, Israel and New Zealand, were among the top 10 'happiest' countries in the world Happiness, Benevolence, and Trust During COVID-19 and Beyond.

Among 146 countries ranked by the report, Afghanistan scores the lowest point of 2.523 and was ranked as the least 'happy' country in the world in 2022.

2021 World Happiness Report

The 2021 World Happiness Report, released on March 20, 2021, ranks 156 countries based on an average of three years of surveys between 2017 and 2019. The 2020 report especially focuses on the environment – social, urban, and natural, and includes links between happiness and sustainable development.

Finland holds the rank of the happiest country in the world for the fourth consecutive year. It is followed by Denmark, Switzerland, Iceland and Netherlands. Afghanistan received the lowest score, with South Sudan and Rwanda just above it. In addition to country rankings, this is the second year that the World Happiness Report ranks cities. The happiest city in the world is Helsinki, the capital of Finland. The report shows that the happiness ranking of cities is almost identical to that of the countries they are in.

2020 World Happiness Report

The 2020 World Happiness Report, released on March 20, 2020, ranks 156 countries based on an average of three years of surveys between 2017 and 2019. The 2020 report especially focuses on the environment – social, urban, and natural, and includes links between happiness and sustainable development.

Finland holds the rank of the happiest country in the world for the third consecutive year. It is followed by Denmark, Switzerland, Iceland and Norway. Afghanistan received the lowest score, with South Sudan and Zimbabwe just above it. In addition to country rankings, this is the first year that the World Happiness Report ranks cities. The happiest city in the world is Helsinki, the capital of Finland. The report shows that the happiness ranking of cities is almost identical to that of the countries they are in.

In 2020, the editorial team expanded and Jan-Emmanuel De Neve became a co-editor, joining John F. Helliwell, Richard Layard, Jeffrey D. Sachs, and the Oxford Wellbeing Research Centre became a fourth research pillar for the report. Associate editors were Lara Aknin, Haifang Huang and Shun Wang, and Sharon Paculor was recognized as production editor. From 2020, Gallup became a full data partner.

2019 World Happiness Report

The 2019 World Happiness Report focuses community. According to the 2019 Happiness Report, Finland is the happiest country in the world, with Denmark, Norway, Iceland, and The Netherlands holding the next top positions.

The second chapter of the report, 'Changing World Happiness', measures year-to-year changes in happiness across countries. For this, changes are reported from 2005-2008 to 2016-2018. Of the 132 countries with data for 2005-2008 and 2016-2018, 106 had significant changes: 64 were significant increases and 42 were significant decreases. Benin was the top gainer, while Venezuela showed the greatest decrease. The chapter also considers how happiness has been affected by changes in the quality of government. The third chapter considers happiness and voting behaviour, with data suggesting that happier people are more likely to vote, and to vote for incumbents.

The fourth chapter is an examination of happiness and pro-social behaviour, finding that people are more likely to derive happiness from helping others when they feel free to choose whether or how to help, when they feel connected to the people they are helping, and when they can see how their help is making a difference.

The final topic of the report, digital and information technologies and happiness, is covered in the remaining chapters.

The editorial team for the 2019 report was expanded to include Lara Aknin as associate editor.

2018 World Happiness Report

The 2018 iteration was released on 20 March and focused on the relation between happiness and migration.

2017 World Happiness Report

The fifth World Happiness Report emphasizes the importance of the social foundations of happiness, which are analysed by comparing the life experiences between the top and bottom ten countries in the year's happiness rankings. Norway topped the global happiness rankings in this report, jumping from fourth place in 2016 to first in 2017. It was followed by Denmark, Iceland and Switzerland. The second chapter of the report focuses on the global rankings and calculates that bringing the social foundations from the lowest levels up to world average levels in 2014-2016 would increase life evaluations by almost two points. This means that social foundations effects are together larger than those of GDP per capita and healthy life expectancy.

The third chapter focuses on economic growth and wellbeing in China, and shows that unemployment and changes in the social safety nets explain both the post-1990 fall in happiness levels and the subsequent recovery since 2005. The fourth chapter discusses the reasons why countries in Africa are generally lagging behind others in life evaluations. The fifth chapter analyses key determinants of happiness, including income, mental health, and physical health. The sixth chapter considers the determinant of employment and work in particular, emphasising the importance of employment for happiness across the world. The final chapter uses happiness history over the past ten years, analysing the case of the United States through the lens of social foundations of happiness.

2016 World Happiness Report

The 2016 World Happiness Report -Rome Addition was issued in two parts as an update. Part one had four chapters: (1) Setting the Stage, (2) The Distribution of World Happiness, (3) Promoting Secular Ethics, and (4) Happiness and Sustainable Development: Concepts and Evidence. Part two has six chapters: (1) Inside the Life Satisfaction Blackbox, (2) Human Flourishing, the Common Good, and Catholic Social Teaching, (3) The Challenges of Public Happiness: An Historical-Methodological Reconstruction, (4) The Geography of Parenthood and Well-Being: Do Children Make Us Happy, Where and Why?, and (5) Multidimensional Well-Being in Contemporary Europe: An Analysis of the Use of a Self-Organizing Map Applied to Share Data.

Chapter 1, Setting the Stage is written by John F. Helliwell, Richard Layard, and Jeffrey Sachs. This chapter briefly surveys the happiness movement ("Increasingly, happiness is considered to be the proper measure of social progress and the goal of public policy.") gives an overview of the 2016 reports and synopsis of both parts of the 2016 Update Rome Addition.

Chapter 2, The Distribution of World Happiness is written by John F. Helliwell, Hailing Huang, and Shun Wang. This chapter reports happiness levels of countries and proposes the use of inequalities of happiness among individuals as a better measure for inequality than income inequality, and that all people in a population fare better in terms of happiness when there is less inequality in happiness in their region. It includes data from the World Health Organization and World Development Indicators, as well as Gallup World Poll. It debunks the notion that people rapidly adapt to changes in life circumstances and quickly return to an initial life satisfaction baseline, finding instead that changes in life circumstances such as government policies, major life events (unemployment, major disability) and immigration change people's baseline life satisfaction levels. This chapter also addresses the measure for affect (feelings), finding that positive affect (happiness, laughter, enjoyment) has much "large and highly significant impact" on life satisfaction than negative affect (worry, sadness, anger). The chapter also examines differences in happiness levels explained by the factors of (1) social support, (2) income, (3) healthy life, (4) trust in government and business, (5) perceived freedom to make life decisions and (6) generosity.

Chapter 3, Promoting Secular Ethics is written by Richard Layard, This chapter argues for a revival of an ethical life and world, harkening to times when religious organizations were a dominant force. It calls on secular non-profit organizations to promote "ethical living in a way that provides inspiration, uplift, joy and mutual respect", and gives examples of implementation by a non-profit founded by Richard Layard, the chapter author, Action for Happiness, which offers online information from positive psychology and Buddhist teachings.

Chapter 4, Happiness and Sustainable Development: Concepts and Evidence is written by Jeffrey Sachs. This chapter identifies ways that sustainable development indicators (economic, social and environmental factors) can be used to explain variations in happiness. It concludes with a report about an appeal to include subjective well-being indicators into the UN Sustainable Development Goals (SDGs).

Part Two 2016 Special Rome Edition was edited by Jeffrey Sacks, Leonardo Becchetti and Anthony Arnett.

Chapter 1, Inside the Life Satisfaction Blackbox is written by Leonardo Becchetti, Luisa Carrado, and Paolo Sama. This chapter proposes using quality of life measurements (a broader range of variables that life evaluation) in lieu of or in addition to overall life evaluations in future World Happiness Reports.

Chapter 2, Human Flourishing, the Common Good, and Catholic Social Teaching is written by Anthony Annett. This chapter contains explanations for three theories: (1) It is human nature to broadly define happiness and understand the connection between happiness and the common good, (2) that the current understanding of individuality is stripped of ties to the common good, and (3) that there is a need to restore the common good as central value for society. The chapter also proposes Catholic school teachings as a model for restoring the common good as a dominant value.

Chapter 3, The Challenges of Public Happiness: An Historical-Methodological Reconstruction is written by Luigino Bruni and Stefano Zemagni. This chapter contemplates Aristotelian concepts of happiness and virtue as they pertain to and support the findings in the World Happiness Reports regarding the impact of social support, trust in government, and equality of happiness.

Chapter 4, The Geography of Parenthood and Well-Being. Do Children Make Us Happy, Where and Why? is written by Luca Stanca. This chapter examines other research findings that children do not add happiness to parents. Using data from the World Values Survey, it finds that, with the exception of widowed parents, having children has a negative effect on life satisfaction for parents in 2/3 of the 105 countries studied, with parents in richer countries suffering more. Once parents are old, life satisfaction increases. The chapter concludes that "existing evidence is not conclusive" and a statement that the causes for the low life satisfaction levels may be that for richer countries, having children is valued less, and in poorer countries, people suffer in financial and time costs when they have children.

Chapter 5, Multidimensional Well-Being in Contemporary Europe: Analysis of the Use of Self-Organizing Map Allied to SHARE Data is written by Mario Lucchini, Luca Crivelli and Sara della Bella. This chapter contains a study of well-being data from older European adults. It finds that this chapter's study results were consistent with the World Happiness Report 2016 update: positive affect (feelings) have a stronger impact on a person's satisfaction with life than do negative affect (feelings).

2015 World Happiness Report

The 2015 World Happiness Report has eight chapters: (1) Setting the Stage, (2) The Geography of World Happiness, (3) How Does Subjective Well-being Vary Around the World by Gender and Age?, (4) How to Make Policy When Happiness is the Goal, (5) Neuroscience of Happiness, (6) Healthy Young Minds Transforming the Mental Health of Children, (7) Human Values, Civil Economy, and Subjective Well-being, and (8) Investing in Social Capital.

Chapter 1, Setting the Stage is written by John F. Helliwell, Richard Layard and Jeffrey Sachs. This chapter celebrates the success of the happiness movement ("Happiness is increasingly considered a proper means of social progress and public policy."), citing the OECD Guidelines on Measuring Subjective Well-being, a referendum in the EU requiring member nations to measure happiness, and the success of the World Happiness reports (with readership at about 1.5 million), and the adoption of happiness by the government of the United Arab Emirates, and other areas. It sets an aspiration of the inclusion of subjective well-being into the 2015 Sustainable Development Goals (not fulfilled), and outlines the 2015 report. It also address the use of the term Happiness, identifying the cons (narrowness of the term, breath of the term, flakiness), and defining the use of the term for the reasons that the 2011 UN General Assembly Resolution 65/309 Happiness Towards A Holistic Approach to Development and April 2012 UN High Level Meeting: Well-being and Happiness: Defining a New Economic Paradigm, Bhutan's Gross National Happiness philosophy, the term's "convening and attention attracting power", and the asset in a "double usage of happiness" as an emotional report and life evaluation.

Chapter 2, The Geography of Happiness is written by John F. Helliwell, Hailing Huang and Shun Wang. This chapter reports the happiness of nations measured by life evaluations. It includes color coded maps and an analysis of six factors the account for the differences: (1) social support in terms of someone to count on in times of need, (2) GDP per capita (income), (3) life expectancy (in terms of healthy years), (4) sense of corruption in government and business (trust), (5) perceived freedom to make life decisions, and (6) generosity. The first three factors were found to have the biggest impact on a population's happiness. Crisis (natural disasters and economic crisis) the quality of governance, and social support were found to be the key drivers for changes in national happiness levels, with the happiness of nations undergoing a crisis in which people have a strong sense of social support falling less than nations where people do not have a strong sense of social support.

Chapter 3, How Does Subjective Well-being Vary Around the Globe by Gender and Age? is written by Nicole Fortin, John F. Helliwell and Shun Wang. This chapter uses data for 12 experiences: happiness (the emotion), smiling or laughing, enjoyment, feeling safe at night, feeling well rested, and feeling interested, as well as anger, worry, sadness, depression, stress and pain to examine differences by gender and age. Findings reported include that there is not a lot of difference in life evaluations between men and women across nations or within ages in a nation (women have slightly higher life evaluations than men: 0.09 on a ten-point scale). It reports that overall happiness falls into a U shape with age on the x axis and happiness on the y, with the low point being middle age (45-50) for most nations (in some happiness does not go up much in later life, so the shape is more of a downhill slide), and that the U shape holds for feeling well rested in all regions. It finds that men generally feel safer at night than women but, when comparing countries, people in Latin America have the lowest sense of safety at night, while people in East Asia and Western Europe have the highest sense of safety at night. It also finds that as women age their sense of happiness declines and stress increases but worry decreases, as all people age their laughter, enjoyment and finding something of interest also declines, that anger is felt everywhere almost equally by men and women, stress peaks in the Middle Ages, and women experience depression more than men. It finds that where older people are happier, there is a sense of social support, freedom to make life choices and generosity (and income does not factor in as heavily as these three factors).

Chapter 4, How to Make Policy When Happiness is the Goal is written by Richard Layard and Gus O'Donnell. This chapter advocates for a "new form of cost-benefit analysis" for government expenditures in which a "critical level of extra happiness" yielded by a project is established. It contemplates the prioritization of increasing happiness of the happy vs. reducing misery of the miserable, as well as the issues of discount rate (weight) for the happiness of future generations. It includes a technical annex with equations for calculating the maximization for happiness in public expenditure, tax policy, regulations, the distribution of happiness and a discount rate.

Chapter 5, Neuroscience of Happiness is written by Richard J. Dawson and Brianna S. Schuyler. This chapter reports on research in brain science and happiness, identifying four aspects that account for happiness: (1) sustained positive emotion, (2) recovery of negative emotion (resilience), (3) empathy, altruism and pro-social behavior, and (4) mindfulness (mind-wandering/affective sickness). It concludes that the brain's elasticity indicates that one can change one's sense of happiness and life satisfaction (separate but overlapping positive consequences) levels by experiencing and practicing mindfulness, kindness, and generosity; and calls for more research on these topics.

Chapter 6, Healthy Young Minds: Transforming the Mental Health of Children is written by Richard Layard and Ann Hagell. This chapter identifies emotional development as of primary importance, (compared to academic and behavioral factors) in a child's development and determination of whether a child will be a happy and well-functioning adult. It then focuses on the issue of mental illness in children, citing the statistic that while worldwide 10% of the world's children (approximately 200 million) suffer from diagnosable mental health problems, even in the richest nations, only one quarter of these children of them are in treatment. It identifies the action steps to treating children with mental health problems: local community-lead child well-being programs, training health care professions to identify mental health problems in children, parity of esteem for mental and physical problems and treatment, access to evidence-based mental health treatment for families and children, promotion of well-being in schools with well-being codes that inform the organizational behavior of schools, training teachers to identify mental health in children, teachings of life skills, measuring of children's well-being by schools, development of free apps available internationally to treat mental illness in teens, and inclusion of mental health with the goal of physical health in the Sustainable Development goals. The chapter lists the benefits of treating children's mental health: improved educational performance, reduction in youth crimes, improved earnings and employment in adulthood, and better parenting of the next generation.

Chapter 7, Human Values, Civil Economy and Subjective Well-being is written by Leonardo Bechhetti, Luigino Bruni and Stefano Zamagni. This chapter begins with a critique of the field of economics ("Economics today looks like physics before the discovery of electrons"), identifying reductionism in which humans are conceived of as 100% self-interested individuals (economic reductionism), profit maximization is prioritized over all other interests (corporate reductionism), and societal values are narrowly identified with GDP and ignore environmental, cultural, spiritual and relational aspects (value reductionism). The chapter them focuses on a theoretical approach termed "Civil Economy paradigm", and research about it demonstrating that going beyond reductionism leads to greater socialization for people and communities, and a rise in priority of the values of reciprocity, friendship, trustworthiness, and benevolence. It makes the argument that positive social relationships (trust, benevolence, shared social identities) yield happiness and positive economic outcomes. It ends with recommendations for move from the dominant model of elite-competitive democracy to a participatory/deliberative model of democracy with bottom-up political and economic participation and incentives for non-selfish actions (altruistic people) and corporations with wider goals than pure profit (ethical and environmentally responsible corporations).

Chapter 8, Investing in Social Capital is written by Jeffrey Sachs. This chapter focuses on "pro-sociality" ("individuals making decisions for the common good that may conflict with short-run egoistic incentives"). It identifies pro-social behaviors: honesty, benevolence, cooperation and trustworthiness. It recommends investment in social capital through education, moral instruction, professional codes of conduct, public censure and condemnation of violators of public trust, and public policies to narrow income inequalities for countries where there is generalized distrust of government and business, pervasive corruption and lawless behavior (such as tax evasion).

2013 World Happiness Report

The 2013 World Happiness Report has eight chapters: (1) Introduction, (2) World Happiness: Trends, Explanations and Distribution, (3) Mental Illness and Unhappiness, (4) The Objective Benefits of Subjective Well-being, (5) Restoring Virtue Ethics in the Quest for Happiness, (6) Using Well-being as a Guide to Policy, (7) The OECD Approach to Measuring Subjective Well-being, and (8) From Capabilities to Contentment: Testing the Links between Human Development and Life Satisfaction.

Chapter 1, Introduction is written by John F. Helliwell, Richard Layard and Jeffrey Sachs. It synopsizes the chapters and gives a discussion of the term happiness.

Chapter 2, World Happiness: Trends, Explanations and Distributions is written by John F. Helliwell and Shun Wang. It provides ratings among countries and regions for satisfaction with life using the Cantril Ladder, positive and negative affect (emotions), and log of GDP per capita, years of healthy life expectancy, having someone to count on in times of trouble, perceptions of corruption, prevalence of generosity, and freedom to make life choices.

Chapter 3, Mental Illness and Unhappiness is written by Richard Layard, Dan Chisholm, Vikram Patel, and Shekhar Saxel. It identifies the far ranging prevalence of mental illness around the world (10% of the world's population at one time) and provides the evidence showing that "mental illness is a highly influential - and...the single biggest - determinant of misery". It concludes with examples of interventions implemented by countries around the world.

Chapter 4, The Objective Benefits of Subjective Well-being is written by Jan-Emmanuel de Neve, Ed Diener, Louis Tay and Cody Xuereb. It provides an explanation of the benefits of subjective well-being (happiness) on health & longevity, income, productivity & organizational behavior, and individual & social behavior. It touches on the role of happiness in human evolution through rewarding behaviors that increase evolutionary success and beneficial to survival.

Chapter 5, Restoring Virtue Ethics in the Quest for Happiness is written by Jeffrey Sachs. It argues that "a renewed focus on the role of ethics, and in particular of virtuous behavior, in happiness could lead us to new and effective strategies for raising individual, national and global well-being", looking to the eightfold noble path (the teachings of the dharma handed down in the Buddhist tradition that encompass wise view/understanding, wise intention, wise speech, wise action, wise livelihood, and effort, concentration and mindfulness), Aristotelian philosophy (people are social animals, "with individual happiness secured only within a political community...[which] should organize its institutions to promote virtuous behavior), and Christian doctrine of St. Thomas Aquinas ("placing happiness in the context of servicing God's will"). It gives an explanation of the evolution of the field of economics up t the "failures of hyper-commercialism" and suggests an antidote based on four global ethical values: (1) non-violence and respect for life, (2) justice and solidarity, (3) honesty and tolerance, and (4) mutual esteem and partnership.

Chapter 6, Using Well-being as Guide to Public Policy is written by Gus O'Donnell. This chapter gives a status report on the issues governments grapple with in adopting well-being and happiness measures and goals for policy, from understanding the data or establishing whether a specific policy improves well-being, to figuring out how to "incorporate well-being into standard policy making". It provides examples of efforts to measure happiness and well-being from Bhutan, New Zealand, South Africa, the UK, and cities and communities in the US, Canada, Australia and Tasmania. It identifies the key policy areas of health, transport and education for policy makers to focus on and includes discussions about interpersonal comparability (concentrating on "getting people out of misery" instead of making happy people happier), discount rate (do we invest more in happiness for people today or in the future?) and putting a monetary value on happiness for policy trade off decisions (e.g. If "a 10% reduction in noise increase SWB by one unit, then we can infer that a 10% reduction is "worth" $1,000" when $1,000 would increase a person's SWB by one unit).

Chapter 7, The OECD Approach to Measuring Subjective Well-being is written by Martine Durand and Conal Smith. This chapter was written the same year the OECD issued its Guidelines on Measuring Subjective Well-being, and is a synopsis of such. It includes a definition for subjective well-being: life evaluation (a person's reflection on their life and life circumstances), affect (positive and negative emotions) and eudaimonia; core measures, a discussion on data collection processes, survey and sample design, other aspects of using subjective well-being metrics, and ideas on how policy-makers can use subjective well-being data. It surveys the status of wealthy countries subjective well-being data collection process, and identifies future directions of experimentation and better income measures, citing the Easterlin Paradox as the basis for this call.

Chapter 8, From Capabilities to Contentment: Testing the Links between Human Development and Life Satisfaction is written by Jon Hall. This chapter explains the components of human development using objective metrics: (1) education, health and command over income and nutrition resources, (2) participation and freedom, (3) human security, (4) equity, and (5) sustainability; key findings of the Human Development Index (HDI) ("weak relationship between economic growth and changes in health and education" as well as life expectancy), and examines the relationship between the HDI and happiness, finding that (1) components of the HDI "correlate strongly with better life evaluations", and (2) there is a strong relationship between life evaluation and the "non-income HDI". It contemplates measurement of conditions of life beyond the HDI that are important to well-being: (1) better working conditions, (2) security against crime and physical violence, (3) participation in economic and political activities, (4) freedom and (5) inequality. The concludes with the statements that the HDI and SWB have similar approaches and importantly connected, with the two disciplines offering alternative and complementary views of development.

2012 World Happiness Report

The 2012 World Happiness Report was issued at the UN High Level Meeting Well-being and Happiness: Defining a New Economic Paradigm by editors John F. Helliwell, Richard Layard and Jeffrey Sachs. Part one has an introduction (chapter 1) and three chapters: (2) the State of World Happiness, (3) Causes of Happiness and Misery, Some Policy Implications. Part two has three chapters, each a case study, of Bhutan, the United Kingdom Office of National Statistics, and the OECD.

Chapter 1, The Introduction is by Jeffrey Sachs and references Buddha and Aristotle, identifies today's era as the anthropocene, and identifies the reasons GDP is not a sufficient measure to guide governments and society.

Chapter 2, The State of World Happiness, is written by John F. Helliwell and Shun Wang, and contains a discussion of subjective well-being measures that ranges from the validity of subjective well-being measures to the seriousness of happiness, happiness set points and cultural comparisons, and it includes data from the Gallup World Poll, European Social Survey, and the World Values Survey.

Chapter 3, The Causes of Happiness and Misery is written by Richard Layard, Andrew Clark, and Claudia Senik, and contemplates research on the impact on happiness of the external factors of income, work, community and governance, values and religion, as well as the internal factors of mental health, physical health, family experience, education, and gender and age.

Chapter 4, Some Policy Implications, written by John F. Helliwell, Richard Layard and Jeffrey Sachs, calls for a greater understanding on how governments can measure happiness, the determinants of happiness, and use of happiness data and findings about determinants for policy purposes. It also highlights the role of GDP ("GDP is important but not all that is important") as a guide to policy makers, the importance that policy makers should place on providing opportunities for employment; the role of happiness in policy making ("Making happiness an objective of governments would not therefore lead to the "servile society", and indeed quite the contrary...Happiness comes from an opportunity to mold one's own future, and thus depends on a robust level of freedom."); the role of values and religion ("In well-functioning societies there is widespread support for the universal value that we should treat others as we would like them to treat us. We need to cultivate social norms so that the rich and powerful are never given a feeling of impunity vis-à-vis the rest of society."); calls for wider access to psychological therapies in a section on mental health citing the fact that one third of all families are affected by mental illness; identifies improvements in physical health as "probably the single most important factor that has improved human happiness" and calls out the rich-poor gap in health care between rich and poor countries; calls on workplace and governmental policies that encourage work–life balance and reduce stress, including family support and child care; and states that "Universal access to education is widely judged to be a basic human right..." The chapter concludes with a philosophical discussion.

Chapter 5, Case Study: Bhutan Gross National Happiness and the GNH Index is written by Karma Ura, Sabine Alkire, and Tsoki Zangmo. It gives a short history of the development of the Gross National Happiness (GNH) concept in Bhutan, and an explanation of the GNH index, data collection and data analysis process, including the rating methodology to determine if an individual experiences happiness sufficiency levels, as well as the policy and lifestyle implications

Chapter 6, Case Study: ONS Measuring Subjective Well-being: The UK Office of National Statistics Experience is written by Stephen Hicks. It covers the basis for the creation of the Measuring National Well-being Programme in the UK's Office of National Statistics (ONS), and the development of their methodology for measuring well-being.

Chapter 5, Case Study OECD Guidelines on Measuring Subjective Well-being is an explanation about the process and rationale the OECD was undertaking to develop its Guidelines on Measuring Subjective Well-being, which it issued in 2013.

== Criticism ==
=== Metrics ===
Critics have pointed out the difference between evaluations and experiences of well-being. For instance Colombia came 37th in the 2018 World Happiness Report rankings but first by daily emotional experience in Gallup's Positive Experience Index. The inconsistencies in the results of different happiness measurement surveys have also been noted, for instance, a Pew survey of 43 countries in 2014 (which excluded most of Europe) had Mexico, Israel, and Venezuela finishing first, second and third. Others point out that the variables of interest used by the World Happiness Report are more appropriate for measuring national-level rather than individual-level happiness.

=== Methodology ===
The World Happiness Report's use of a single-item indicator of subjective well-being is different from more traditional Index approaches which use a range of indicators such as the United Nations' Human Development Index, the OECD Better Life Index of 2011, or the Social Progress Index of 2013. There has also been an ongoing debate regarding single-item and multi-item scales as measures of life satisfaction.

The idea that subjective well-being can be captured by a survey has also been contested by economists, who have identified that people's assessments of their happiness can be affected by how, for example, their country's education system grades exams, and that survey questions on subjective well-being are affected by response styles.

== See also ==
- Broad measures of economic progress
- Disability-adjusted life year
- Gross National Happiness
- Green national product
- Genuine Progress Indicator
- Happiness economics
- International Happiness Day
- Leisure satisfaction
- Median income
- Positive psychology
- Post-materialism
- Progressive utilization theory
- Psychometrics
- Subjective life satisfaction

=== Indexes ===
- Gender-related Development Index
- Happy Planet Index
- Human Development Index
- Legatum Prosperity Index
- OECD Better Life Index
- Where-to-be-born Index
- World Values Survey
