= Universal value =

Value that has the same worth for all people

A value is a universal value if it has the same value or worth for all, or almost all, people. Spheres of human value encompass morality, aesthetic preference, traits, human endeavour, and social order. Whether universal values exist is an unproven conjecture of moral philosophy and cultural anthropology, though it is clear that certain values are found across a great diversity of human cultures, such as primary attributes of physical attractiveness (e.g. youthfulness, symmetry) whereas other attributes (e.g. slenderness) are subject to aesthetic relativism as governed by cultural norms. This objection is not limited to aesthetics. Relativism concerning morals is known as moral relativism, a philosophical stance opposed to the existence of universal moral values.

The claim for universal values can be understood in two different ways. First, it could be that something has a universal value when everybody finds it valuable. This was Isaiah Berlin's understanding of the term. According to Berlin,

"Universal values... are values that a great many human beings in the vast majority of places and situations, at almost all times, do in fact hold in common, whether consciously and explicitly or as expressed in their behaviour ..."

Second, something can have universal value when all people have reason to believe it has value: Amartya Sen interprets the term in this way, pointing out that when Mahatma Gandhi argued that non-violence is a universal value, he was arguing that all people have reason to value non-violence, not that all people currently value non-violence.

Many different things have been claimed to be of universal value, for example, fertility, pleasure, and democracy. The issue of whether anything is of universal value, and, if so, what that thing or those things are, is relevant to psychology, political science, and philosophy, among other fields.

== Perspectives from various disciplines ==
=== Philosophy ===
Philosophical study of universal value addresses questions such as the meaningfulness of universal value or whether universal values exist.

=== Sociology ===
Sociological study of universal value addresses how such values are formed in a society.

=== Psychology ===
S. H. Schwartz, along with a number of psychology colleagues, has carried out empirical research investigating whether there are universal values, and what those values are. Schwartz defined 'values' as "conceptions of the desirable that influence the way people select action and evaluate events". He hypothesised that universal values would relate to three different types of human need: biological needs, social co-ordination needs, and needs related to the welfare and survival of groups. Schwartz's results from a series of studies that included surveys of more than 25,000 people in 44 countries with a wide range of different cultural types suggest that there are fifty-six specific universal values and ten types of universal value. Schwartz's ten types of universal value are: power, achievement, hedonism, stimulation, self-direction, universalism, benevolence, tradition, conformity, and security. Below are each of the value types, with the specific related values alongside:

- Power: authority; leadership; dominance, social power, wealth
- Achievement: success; capability; ambition; influence; intelligence; self-respect
- Hedonism: pleasure; enjoying life
- Stimulation: daring activities; varied life; exciting life
- Self-direction: creativity; freedom; independence; curiosity; choosing your own goals
- Universalism: broadmindedness; wisdom; social justice; equality; a world at peace; a world of beauty; unity with nature; protecting the environment; inner harmony
- Benevolence: helpfulness; honesty; forgiveness; loyalty; responsibility; friendship
- Tradition: accepting one's portion in life; humility; devoutness; respect for tradition; moderation
- Conformity: self-discipline; obedience
- Security: cleanliness; family security; national security; stability of social order; reciprocation of favours; health; sense of belonging

Schwartz also tested an eleventh possible universal value, 'spirituality', or 'the goal of finding meaning in life', but found that it does not seem to be recognised in all cultures.

== Religion ==
In the Catholic Church, the Second Vatican Council (1962-1965) referred to "common human values", arguing that such values "call for cooperation between Christians pursuing apostolic aims and those who do not profess Christ's name but acknowledge these values".

== See also ==
- Christian universalism
- Cultural universal
- Human rights
- Moral hierarchy
- Moral universalism
- Unconditional love
- Unconditional positive regard
- Universal basic income
- Universal basic services
- Universalism
- Value system
