= Moral high ground =

Upholding a universally recognized standard of justice or goodness

The moral high ground, in ethical or political parlance, refers to the status of being respected for remaining moral, and adhering to and upholding a universally recognized standard of justice or goodness. In derogatory context, the term is often used to metaphorically describe a position of self-righteousness.

Parties seeking the moral high ground simply refuse to act in ways which are not viewed as legitimate and morally defensible.

== Politics ==
Holding the moral high ground can be used to legitimize political movements, notably nonviolent resistance, especially in the face of violent opposition, and has been used by civil disobedience movements around the world to garner sympathy and support from society.

== Business ==
Economist and social critic Robert H. Frank challenged the idea that prosocial behavior was necessarily deleterious in business in his book What Price the Moral High Ground?

He argued that socially responsible firms often reap unexpected benefits even in highly competitive environments, because their commitment to principle makes them more attractive as partners to do business with.

== Everyday use ==
In everyday use a person may take the perspective of the moral high ground in order to produce a critique of something, or merely to win an argument. This perspective is sometimes associated to snobbery but may also be a legitimate way of taking up a stance.

Social sciences or philosophies are sometimes accused of taking the moral high ground because they are often inherently interested in the project of human freedom and justice. The traditional project of education itself may be seen as defending a type of moral high ground from popular culture, perhaps by using critical pedagogy: its proponents may themselves be accused (rightly or wrongly) of seeking a false and unjustified sense of superiority thereby.

== See also ==
- Critical pedagogy
- Moral hierarchy
- Political posturing
- Virtue signalling
