= Moral hierarchy =

A moral hierarchy is a hierarchy by which actions are ranked by their morality, with respect to a moral code.

It also refers to a relationship – such as teacher/pupil or guru/disciple – in which one party is taken to have greater moral awareness than the other; or to the beneficial hierarchy of parent/child or doctor/patient.

== Kohlberg ==
Kohlberg's stages of moral development have been read as creating a hierarchy of increasing moral complexity, ranging from the premoral at the bottom, through the midrange of conventionalism, up to the apex of self-selected morality.

In similar fashion, Robin Skynner viewed moral ideas (such as the 'myths' of Charis Katakis) as being interpretable at different levels, depending on the degree of mental health attained; while Eric Berne saw the three ego states of Parent/Adult/Child as falling naturally into a moral hierarchy universally respected in both time and place.

== Dante ==
Dante's universe was structured in a hierarchy of moral sins and moral virtues, the stratified circles of Hell reaching down for example from the self-indulgent sins at the higher levels, to those of violence below, and the fraudulent at the bottom.

== Confucianism ==
The Confucian concept of a moral hierarchy traditionally served as a check on arbitrary power in China.

Arguably at least, the concept of a moral hierarchy still influences China's view of its place in the world today.

== Criticism ==
Critics charge that the notion of a moral hierarchy is untenable in cases spanning multiple cultures, because moral codes are not equal but different, and therefore there is no way of showing that certain codes are superior to others.

Proponents of Kohlberg argue against such a relativistic view of morality, however, by pointing to cross-cultural evidence from more than 30 societies supporting the concept of a hierarchy of levels of moral complexity.

== See also ==
- Carol Gilligan
- James W. Fowler
- Jane Loevinger
- Moral high ground
- Moral psychology
- Science of morality
- McDougall
