= World Happiness Council =

Emirati-based think tank

The World Happiness Council is a think tank of politicians and researchers based in the United Arab Emirates, intended to promote happiness and subjective well-being through the identification of public policy for policymakers worldwide and the standardization of happiness as a measure to guide governments.

== Overview ==
In 2017, the think tank's formation was announced by the Prime Minister and Vice-President of the United Arab Emirates, and Ruler of Dubai, Sheikh Mohammed bin Rashid Al Maktoum on 20 March, the International Day of Happiness. In a tweet, the Prime Minister Sheikh Mohammed bin Rashid Al Maktoum announced the six focal areas of the council as health, education, environment, personal happiness, happy cities, and community standards for happiness.

The council issues annual Global Happiness Policy Reports during the UAE's World Government Summit. It meets twice yearly, at the World Government Summit, and at the United Nations General Assembly. It receives administrative support from the United Nations Sustainable Development Solutions Network. Jeffrey Sachs of Columbia University is the chair of the council.

Founding members of the council are Irina Bokova, Director-General of Unesco, Alexander Stubb, former Prime Minister of Finland, Richard Layard and John F. Helliwell, editors of the World Happiness Report, Ed Diener, senior scientist with the Gallup Organisation, Martin Seligman, Director of Authentic Happiness, Aisha Bin Bishr, Director General of the Smart Dubai Office, Ahmad Al Shugairi, Sonja Lyubomirsky, author of The How of Happiness, Shawn Achor, author of The Happiness Advantage, Martine Durand, Director of Statistics and Chief Statistician at the OECD, and Jan-Emmanuel De Neve, Professor of Economics at University of Oxford. In 2018, the committee was expanded to include Dasho Karma Ura, president of Centre for Bhutan Studies & GNH Research, Lise Kingo, CEO and Executive Director of the United Nations Global Compact, and Gus O'Donnell, former Cabinet Secretary and head of the U.K. Civil Service.

== Subcouncils ==
- The Council of Happiness and Health, chaired by Professor Lord Richard Layard of the London School of Economics
- The Council of Happiness and Education, chaired by psychology Professor Martin Seligman of the University of Pennsylvania
- The Council of Personal Happiness, chaired by psychology Professor Ed Diener of the University of Utah and the University of Virginia
- The Council of Workplace Happiness, chaired by economics Professor Jan-Emmanuel De Neve of Oxford University
- The Council of Happiness Measurement, chaired by Martine Durand, Chief Statistician and Director of Statistics Directorate of the Organisation for Economic Co-operation and Development
- The Council of Happy Cities, chaired by Her Excellency Dr. Aisha Bin Bishr, Director General of the Smart Dubai Office

== UAE Happiness and Public Policy Programs ==
The UAE's National Program for Happiness and Wellbeing is an initiative of the national government of the United Arab Emirates. It is headed by the Minister of State for Happiness and Wellbeing, Her Excellency Ohood bint Khalfan Al Roumi, whose position was created by UAE's Prime Minister Sheikh Mohammed bin Rashid Al Maktoum in 2016.

The programme has three focal areas: 1) integration of happiness into all aspects of governmental policies, programs and services, 2) promotion of happy and positive lifestyles for civil servants, citizens and residents, and 3) measuring and managing happiness through happiness indicators and tools. The Happiness Policy Manual is one such tool created to aid the integration of happiness into policy. Other officials in the program include the CEO of Happiness and Positivity in the Private Sector, who works with the Wharton School of Business, who is tasked with aiding the integration of happiness into government entities, as well as 60 Chief Happiness and Positivity Officers who work in various governmental offices.

The Minister of the State of Happiness, H. E. Sheikha Ohood bint Khalfan Al Roumi, convenes a Dialogue for Global Happiness, an invitation only event that is part of the World Government Summit. World Happiness Council members participate in the dialogue and their first report, the Global Happiness Policy Report 2018, was issued as part of the dialogue. Topics covered include good governance, mental illness, positive education, work and well-being, social well-being, smart cities, and national governments experience measuring happiness and well-being.

The UAE was rated the happiest country in the Arab world in 2017. The motive for the creation of a Ministry of the State of Happiness was for the UAE to be among the top five happiest countries in the world, as ranked by the World Happiness Reports. Under the leadership of Her Excellency Dr. Aisha bin Bishr, Dubai aims to become the happiest city in the world.
