= World Governments Summit =

Event for government leaders

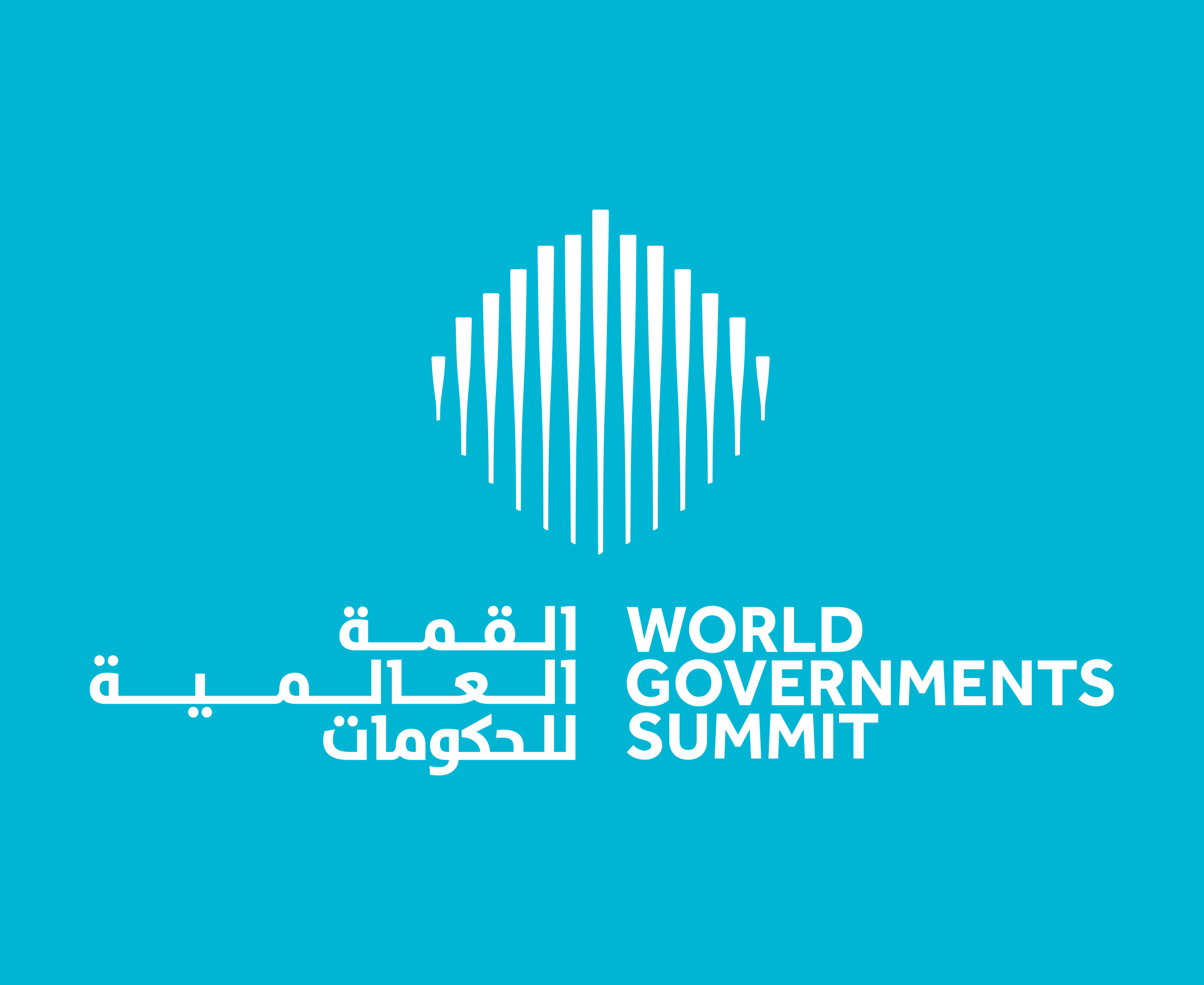
- Formation: 2013; 13 years ago
- Type: Non-governmental organization
- Purpose: Social and economic
- Headquarters: Dubai, United Arab Emirates
- Key people: Mohammad bin Abdullah Al Gergawi (Chairman); Ohood bint Khalfan Al Roumi (Vice Chair); Omar Sultan Al Olama (Vice Chair); Mohamed Al Sharhan (Managing Director)
- Website: worldgovernmentsummit.org

The World Governments Summit is an annual event since 2013, held in Dubai, United Arab Emirates. It brings together leaders in government for a global dialogue with a focus on issues of futurism, technology and innovation. The summit acts as a knowledge exchange hub between government officials, thought leaders, policy makers and private sector leaders to discuss future trends, issues and opportunities facing humanity. The summit has typically hosted approximately 90 speakers from 150 participating countries, along with some 4000 attendees.

== History ==
The World Governments Summit was formed in 2013 by a team of experts from different disciplines to bring government, business and civil society together with the goal of improving the future for the seven billion people on the planet. The chairman of the World Governments Summit is Mohammad Al Gergawi with Ohood bint Khalfan Al Roumi and Omar Al Olama serving as Vice Chairs of the organization.

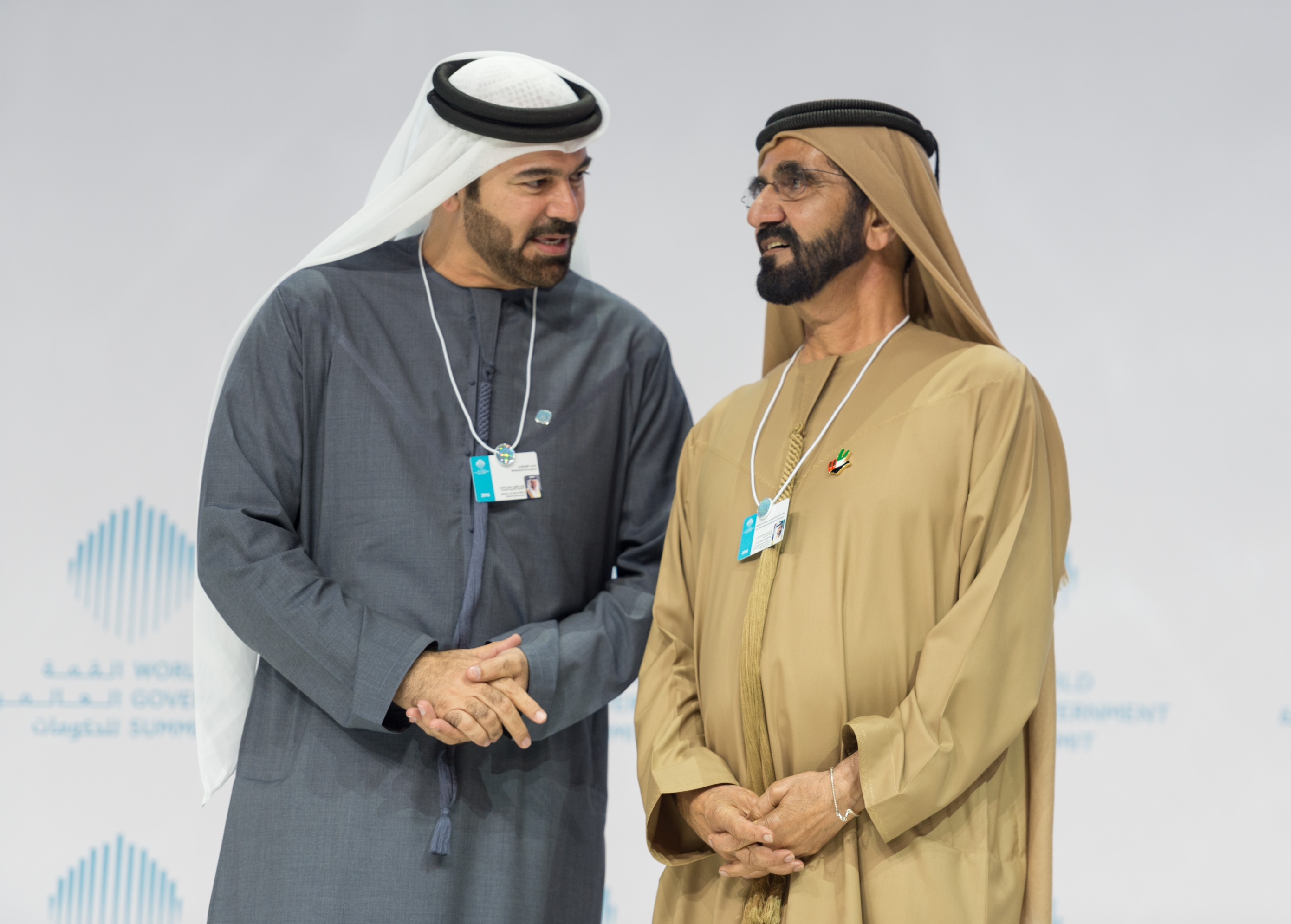
Sheikh Mohammed Bin Rashid and Mohammad Al Gergawi during World Governments Summit

In 2015, under the directive of His Highness Sheikh Mohammad Bin Rashid Al Maktoum (Ruler of Dubai) and Mohammad Al Gergawi (chairman of the summit's organizing committee and minister of the UAE Cabinet Affairs & The Future) announced ten key changes to take the summit to a new global level. The changes included changing the summit's name from Government Summit to World Governments Summit, changing the entity structure and adopting the goal of providing integrated knowledge services for over 150 governments and global organizations.

In 2016, the World Governments Summit Organization adopted a new year-round membership system. Members have exclusive invitations to attend the summit, communicate directly with its top speakers and attendees, receive reports issued by the summit ahead of general public, gain exclusive access to private functions held on the sidelines of events, and have access to training workshops and executive education programs hosted by the summit in collaboration with global experts.

As of 2018, reports for the public about issues explored at the summits were typically issued by Summit members and contributors, on the World Governments Summit website, and many conferences speeches were available on the Youtube Channel for the World Governments Summit.

== Themes ==
The first World Governments Summit was held in Dubai in 2013, and has been held annually since then. In 2013, themes included building citizen trust in governmental entities, social media as a tool for civic engagement, private-public sector partnerships, and measuring development.

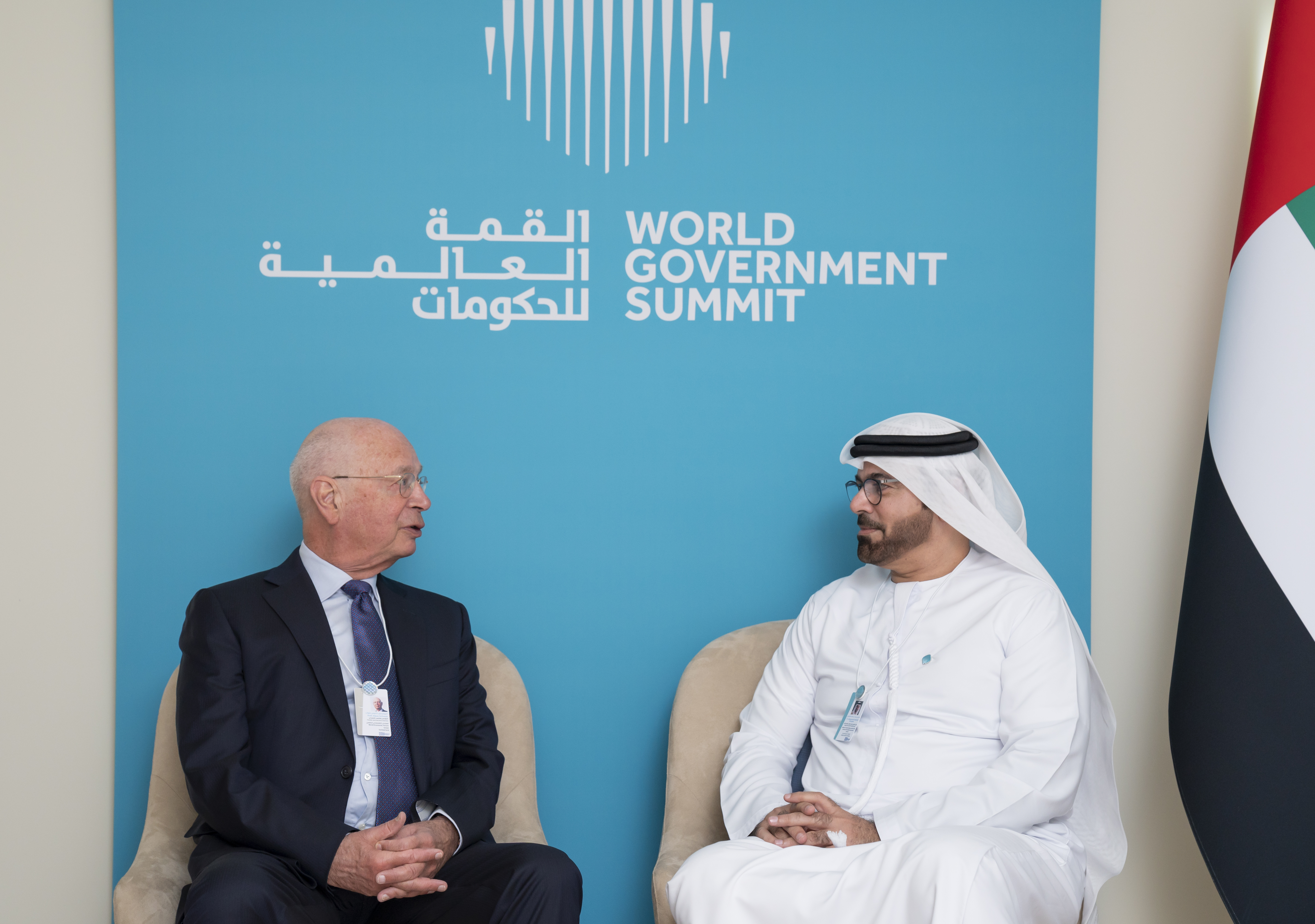
A conversation between Mohammad Al Gergawi and Klaus Schwab during World Governments Summit

In 2014, themes included partnerships and innovation in government service delivery, government smart toolboxes (using information technology for citizen engagement, anti-corruption efforts and helping citizens affected by conflict) and digital government.

In 2015, themes included smart cities, innovation, and better jobs.

In 2016, themes included the Sustainable Development Goals, the state of sustainability, and advanced science and the future of government (robotics and artificial intelligence, genomic medicine and biometrics). In 2016, the summit included an inaugural Best Minister in the World award which was awarded to Greg Hunt, at that time Australian Minister of Federal Environment, later appointed as Australian Minister of Health.

In 2017, the summit focused on four main themes: 1) climate change & food security, 2) citizen well-being & happiness, 3) government agility and geopolitics & humanitarian aid, with the goal of focusing on fundamental questions that aim to pave the way for that future across the globe. The summit was held under the patronage of Mohammed bin Rashid Al Maktoum, the Vice President and Prime Minister of the UAE and ruler of Dubai, and included participation of seven international organizations as strategic partners, including the International Monetary Fund, the United Nations, UNESCO, Organisation for Economic Cooperation and Development (OECD) and the World Economic Forum.

In 2018, the themes included artificial intelligence and happiness.

In 2023, the summit was held under the theme of “Shaping Future Governments”. It brought together 20 heads of state and government, 250 ministers, along with the participation of 10,000 private sector leaders, global experts, and thought leaders to tackle future opportunities, trends, and challenges.

In 2026, The World Governments Summit 2026 took place from 3 to 5 February, with preparatory events on 1 to 2 February. The summit adopted the theme “Shaping Future Governments” and recorded its largest participation to date, with more than 35 heads of state, representatives from over 150 governments, and 400 speakers. During the opening session, Spanish Prime Minister Pedro Sánchez announced at the World Governments Summit plans to prohibit users under the age of 16 from accessing social media platforms.

== Speakers ==
World Government Summit speakers have included:

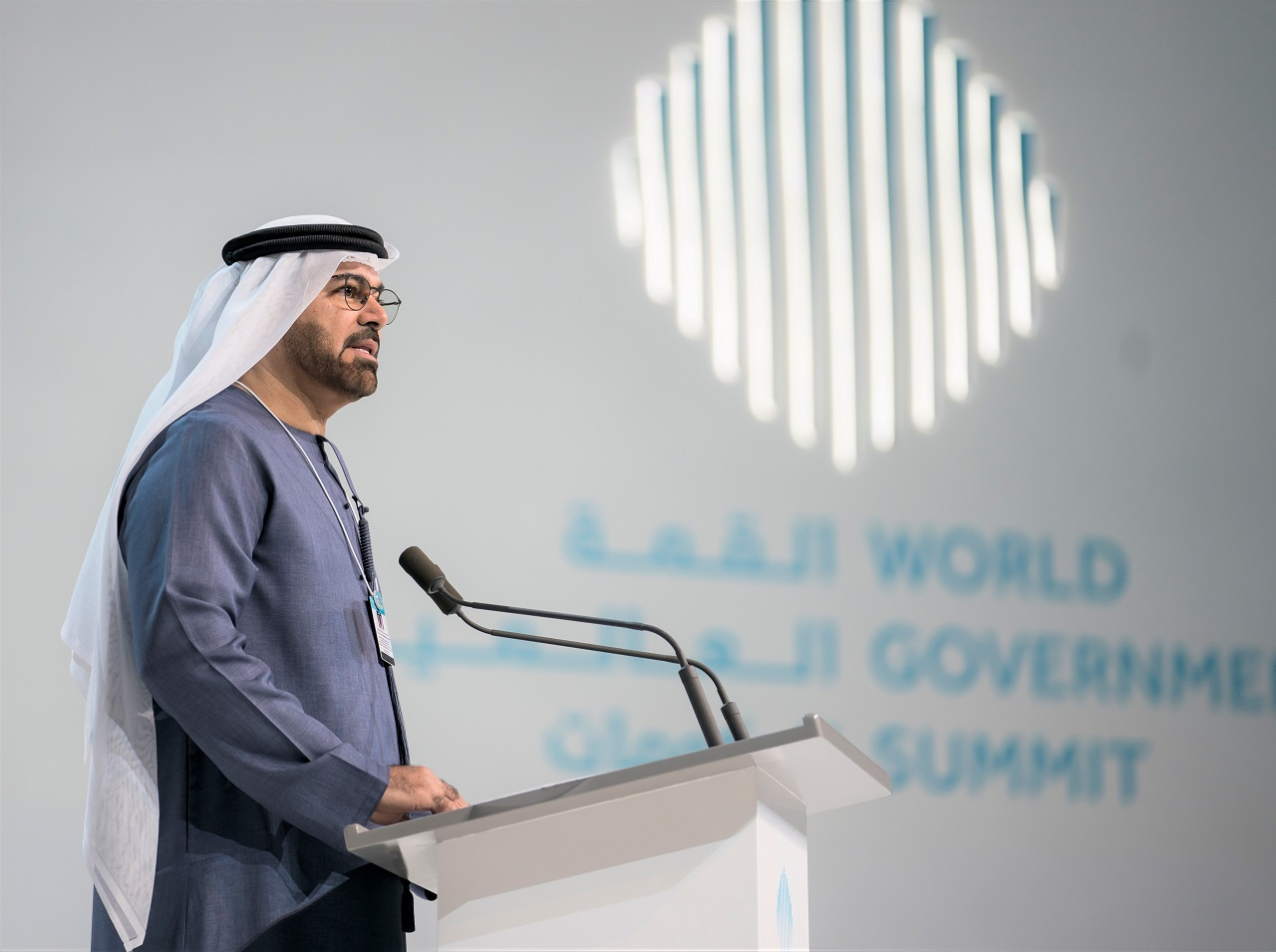
Mohammad Al Gergawi delivering the opening address, WGS 2018

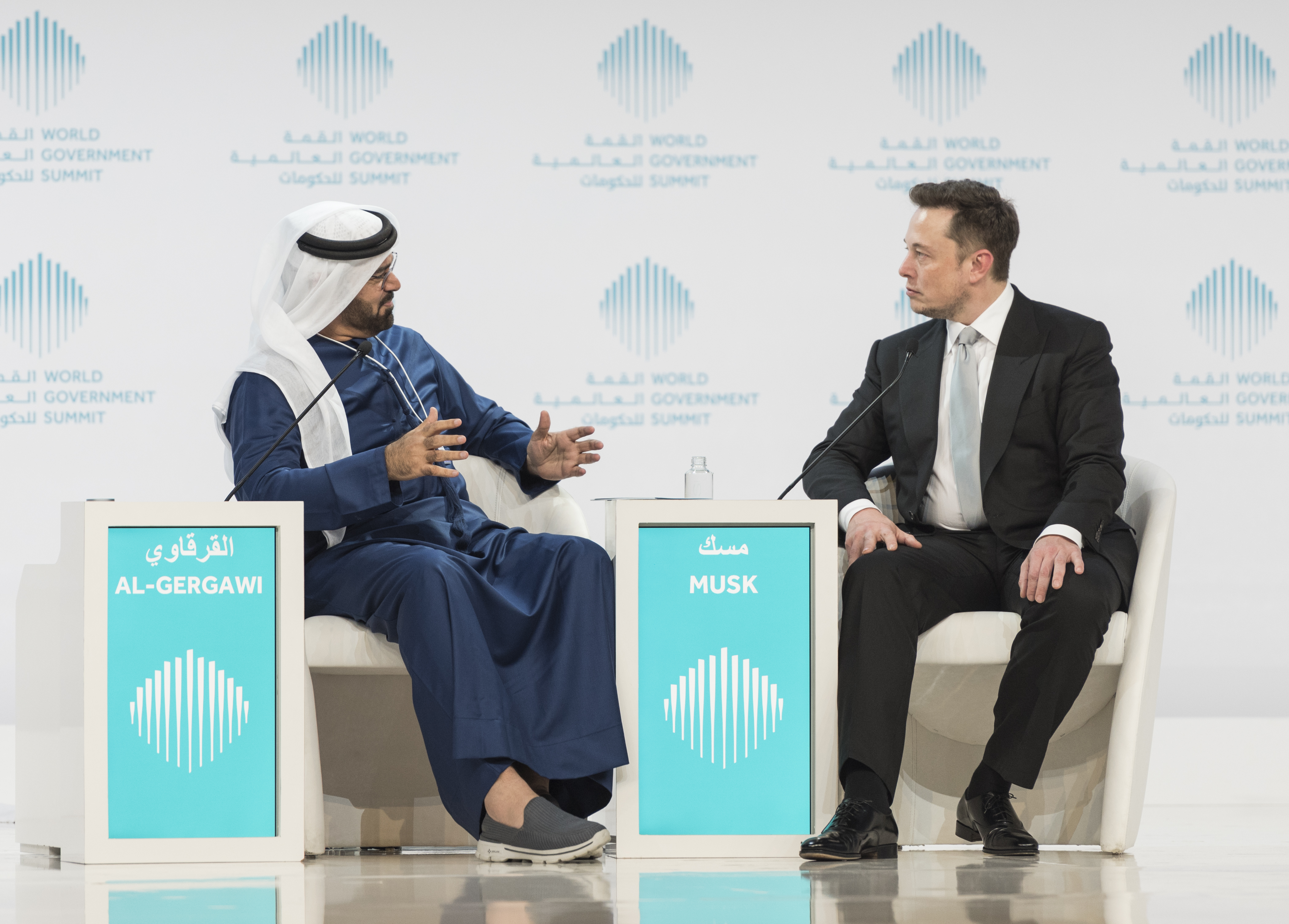
Mohammad Al Gergawi and Elon Musk session

- Queen Rania Al Abdullah, The Hashemite Kingdom of Jordan
- AbdulLatif Al Zayani, secretary general, Gulf Cooperation Council
- Baharash Bagherian, CEO of URB.
- Ban Ki-moon, secretary general of the United Nations
- Boo Keun Yoon, CEO, Samsung Electronics Co.
- Richard Branson, founder, Virgin Group
- Dan Buettner, National Geographic Fellow, The Blue Zones
- Kathy Calvin, president and chief executive officer of the United Nations Foundation
- Tucker Carlson, political commentator
- Deepak Chopra, author
- Martine Durand, OECD chief statistician and director of statistics
- Idris Elba, Actor and a UN Goodwill Ambassador.
- Malcolm Gladwell, author
- José Ángel Gurría, secretary general of the OECD
- Arianna Huffington, founder of Thrive Global
- Paul Kagame, President of Rwanda
- Travis Kalanick, co-founder of Uber
- Imran Khan, Prime Minister of Pakistan
- Jim Yong Kim, president of The World Bank Group
- Kent Larson, Director, City Science, MIT Media Lab
- Sheikh Mohammad Bin Rashid Al Maktoum, vice president and Prime Minister of the UAE and Ruler of Dubai
- Narendra Modi, Prime Minister of India
- Elon Musk, technology entrepreneur; co-founder and CEO of SpaceX; co-founder and CEO of Tesla
- Joseph Muscat, Prime Minister of Malta
- Sheikh Mohammed Bin Zayed Al Nahyan, Crown Prince of Abu Dhabi and Deputy Supreme Commander of the UAE Armed Forces
- Barack Obama, former US President
- Pedro Sánchez, Spanish Prime Minister.
- Klaus Schwab, founder and former executive chairman of the World Economic Forum
- Neil deGrasse Tyson, Astrophysicist, Director of The Hayden Planetarium
- Andrew Weil, MD, author
- Steve Wozniak, co-founder of Apple
- Muhammad Yunus, Nobel Peace Prize Laureate
- José Zapatero, former Prime Minister of Spain
- Tony Blair, former Prime Minister of the United Kingdom
- Sheryl Sandberg, former COO of Meta Platforms
- Jack Ma, founder of Alibaba Group
- Reed Hastings, co‑founder of Netflix
- Indra Nooyi, former CEO of PepsiCo
- Michael Bloomberg, founder of Bloomberg L.P.
- Daniel Ek, CEO of Spotify
- Susan Wojcicki, former CEO of YouTube
- Brian Chesky, co‑founder and CEO of Airbnb
- Patrick Collison, co‑founder and CEO of Stripe
- Dara Khosrowshahi, CEO of Uber
- Safra Catz, CEO of Oracle
- Mary Barra, CEO of General Motors
- Tim Cook, CEO of Apple
- Jensen Huang, CEO of NVIDIA
- Marc Benioff, CEO of Salesforce
- David Solomon, CEO of Goldman Sachs
- Jamie Dimon, CEO of JPMorgan Chase
- Bob Iger, CEO of The Walt Disney Company
- Andrew Liveris, former CEO of Dow Chemical
- Masayoshi Son, CEO SoftBank

== Forums and Events ==
=== Museum of the Future ===
The Museum of the Future, is one of the exhibitions within the World Government Summit. The Museum of the Future features exhibitions exploring the future of science, technology and innovation. In 2016, the Museum of the Future's displays included an installment about a trip to the year 2035 where it showcased how technology could evolve and be used to manage complex social end economic systems. In 2017, the museum included a display with an air taxi, 3-D printed seeds and food, and an announcement by His Highness Sheikh Mohammad Bin Rashid Al Maktoum to colonize Mars by 2117. In 2018, Dubai 10x 2.0 was featured, with expositions about plans to integrate A.I. into many aspects of government and rapidly develop Dubai's governmental and private sector services.

=== Global Dialogue for Happiness ===
In 2017, the World Government Summit held the first Global Dialogue for Happiness, a one-day event prior to the summit. It was convened by the UAE Minister of State for Happiness and Wellbeing, Her Excellency Ohood bint Khalfan Al Roumi. Speakers at the first summit included editors of the World Happiness Report, Jeffrey Sachs, John F. Helliwell, and Richard Layard, positive psychologists Edward Diener, Mihaly Csikszentmihalyi, Martin Seligman, and policy makers including the Prime Minister of Bhutan Tshering Tobgay, Head of the UN Development Programme Helen Clark, Bhutanese Gross National Happiness official Karma Ura. It was an invitation-only event for approximately 200 people. The event was expanded to approximately 600 people in 2018. The first Global Happiness Policy Report was issued by the World Happiness Council, a council conceived of by the Minister of State for Happiness and Wellbeing under the umbrella of the Global Dialogue for Happiness. In 2018, His Highness Sheikh Mohammed bin Rashid Al Maktoum convened six nations, the United Arab Emirates, Costa Rica, Portugal, Slovenia, Mexico, and Kazakhstan to establish the Global Happiness Coalition, an agreement to cooperate on an international level to bring happiness to the forefront for government.

=== Global Artificial Intelligence Forum ===
In 2018, the first Global Artificial Intelligence Forum was convened. The forum brought together approximately 100 people, including representatives of the OECD, IEEE, U.N., and the private sector. Discussion topics included a Global Strategy for the Governance for A.I., which will include policy recommendations. The AI Initiative which is part of The Future Society was contracted to steward the forum. The goal of the first forum was to identify guidelines for the global governance of Artificial Intelligence.

=== Awards ===
- The Best Minister Award commends the extraordinary work of government ministers at demonstrating excellence in the public sector;
- Global Universities Challenge the Challenge brings together over 100 students from renowned universities across the globe and engages them in an innovative competition to improve the way governments work.
- GovTech Prize. As part of the World Government Summit, the United Arab Emirates runs the “GovTech Prize”, an annual global award that is designed to motivate world government entities, startups to create and innovate GovTech solutions that help contribute to solving common global pressing challenges.
- Edge of Government innovation experience challenges visitors to think in new and often counter-intuitive ways about how to solve the most pressing public challenges of our time.
- World Data Visualization Prize. Introduced in 2019 edition, the prize focuses on how governments are improving citizens’ lives, and the innovations - seen and unseen - that drive and measure success in this realm.
