= Minister of State for Happiness =

Position in the UAE government

Minister of State for Happiness and Wellbeing (Arabic: وزير الدولة للسعادة وجودة الحياة) is a Minister of State in the United Arab Emirates Cabinet, which oversees the UAE plans, programs and policies to achieve a happier society. The responsibility of this office is to "align and drive government policy to create social good and satisfaction."

== Ministers ==
On 10 February 2016, UAE Prime Minister Sheikh Mohammed bin Rashid Al Maktoum announced, through his Twitter account, the appointment of Her Excellency Ohoud Al Roumi - whose full name is Ohood bint Khalfan Al Roumi - as the country's first Minister for State of Happiness.^{[3]} The announcement was made during Dubai's annual World Government Summit.

== Programs and Initiatives ==
In its first year (2016), as part of the overall National Happiness and Positivity Program, the Minister of State for Happiness launched a number of programs and initiatives. Some of these are:

- Chief Happiness and Positivity Officer Program (private sector)
- Chief Happiness and Positivity Officer Program (government)
- Happy and Positive Offices
- Customer Happiness Formula
- Happiness and Positivity Councils
- Happiness and Positivity Hours (federal government)
- Happiness and Positivity Heroes Medal
- Customer Happiness Employees
- Customer Happiness Centres
- UAE Declaration of Happiness and Positivity

== Chief Happiness and Positivity Officer Program ==
In July 2016, the Minister of State for Happiness publicly announced the selection of 60 individuals, representing federal and local government entities, as the original cohort of the Chief Happiness and Positivity Program.

To learn the knowledge and develop the skills necessary to realize the objectives of the Chief Happiness and Positivity Officer Program, the selected candidates attend the Greater Good Science Center of the University of California, Berkeley and the Oxford Mindfulness Centre of the University of Oxford, two of several international partners enlisted by the UAE government to ensure the success of its Program.

The Program consists of five pillars: the science of happiness and positivity, mindfulness, leading a happy team, happiness and policies in government work, and measuring happiness.

== Similar Ministries in the World ==
The Minister of State for Happiness in the UAE was not the first to be named that, there are a number of similar ministries in the world.

- The Ministry of Happiness in Bhutan in 1972, the ministry was established and considered an indicator of happiness and economic development based on Buddhist principles.
- The Ministry of Yoga in India was established in 2014, by the Indian Prime Minister to promote traditional and yoga. Sherpad Naik, Minister of Culture and Tourism, was appointed Minister of this ministry

== See also ==
- Ministry of Tolerance, also in the UAE
