= John F. Helliwell =

Canadian economist

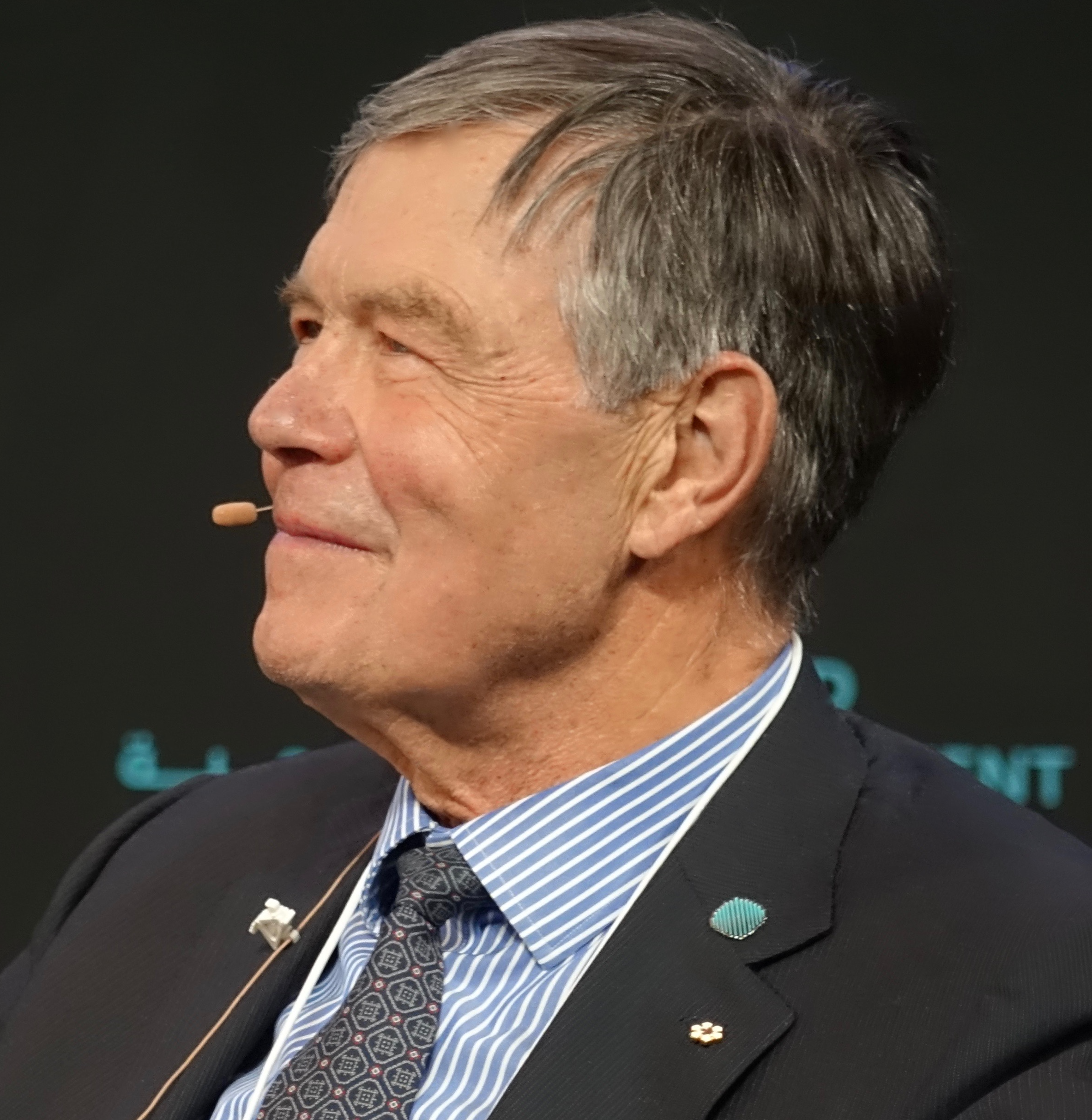
John F. Helliwell, economist and editor of the World Happiness Report, speaking at the World Government Summit in Dubai in 2017 about happiness as the purpose of government

John F. Helliwell (born August 15, 1937) is a Canadian economist, professor emeritus of Economics at the University of British Columbia. senior fellow of the Canadian Institute for Advanced Research (CIFAR) and co-director of the CIFAR Programme on Social Interactions, Identity, and Well-Being; Board Director of the International Positive Psychology Association, and editor of the World Happiness Report.

Helliwell's early research heavily focused on developing national and global econometric models for studying national economies and their international linkages, including integrating energy considerations into models, for the Organization for Economic Cooperation and Development (OECD), Bank of Canada, the Reserve Bank of Australia, the Reserve Bank of New Zealand, and the International Project Link, the latter led by Nobel Laureate, Lawrence Klein. (For a history of how central banks, and especially the Bank of Canada, developed macro econometric models in the 1960s and 1970s, see the Bank of Canada Review publication From Flapper to Bluestocking: What Happened to the Young Woman of Wellington Street?).

During his tenure at Harvard from 1991 to 1996 as a Mackenzie King Chair of Canadian Studies between 1991 and 1994, and Fulbright Fellow and chair of the Canada Seminar 1995–1996, he conducted research in collaboration with Robert Putnam in the study of social capital as a measure of the social linkages that help communities to operate effectively. This work lead to research into using measures of subjective well-being to provide a broader way of measuring human progress. Helliwell subsequently collaborated with other researchers in the emerging field, including Robert Putnam, Ed Diener, Daniel Kahneman, Richard Layard, and a wide variety of other researchers and practitioners. The World Happiness Report grew out of a conference in Thimphu chaired by past Bhutanese Prime Minister Thinley and Jeffrey Sachs, held pursuant to the United Nations' June 2011 General Assembly Resolution 65/309, Happiness: towards a holistic approach to development, introduced by Bhutan, and in preparation for, and support of, the subsequent High Level Meeting at the United Nations' headquarters in New York City called Happiness and Wellbeing: Defining a New Economic Paradigm held on April 2, 2012.

== Early life and education ==
Helliwell was raised in Vancouver, British Columbia, the son of Kathleen Birnie Helliwell (maiden name Kerby, born in Grand Forks, British Columbia in 1904) and father John L. Helliwell (born Vancouver BC in 1904, a partner of Helliwell, MacLachlan & Co, Chartered Accountants), donor of Helliwell Provincial Park on Hornby Island. He graduated from Prince of Wales High School and attended University of British Columbia where he received a Bachelor of Arts in commerce in 1959, graduating as a valedictorian. In 1959, he was a British Columbia Rhodes Scholar to Oxford, where he read for the Bachelor of Arts in philosophy, Politics and Economics (PPE) with a specialization in philosophy at St. John's College, Oxford and received a first class in 1961. He received a Doctor of Philosophy (DPhil) in economics from Nuffield College, Oxford's graduate college for the social sciences, with his thesis entitled The Investment Process, submitted in 1965 and received in 1966 based on research he conducted for the Royal Commission on Banking and Finance (1964) and the Royal Commission on Taxation (1966), in both cases studying how firms make decisions to invest in plant, equipment, and research. A revised version of the thesis published by Oxford University Press entitled Public Policies and Private Investment in 1968.

== Academic career ==
Helliwell was appointed associate professor of economics at the University of British Columbia in 1967, becoming professor in 1971 and professor emeritus in 2003. (His interview is part of the University of British Columbia Legacy project.). He served as head of the University of British Columbia economics department between 1989–1991 and member of the University of British Columbia Senate between 1989–1991 and 1999–2002. Helliwell was a Fulbright Fellow and co-chair of the Canada Program at Harvard University between 1995 – 1996. In 2003, he was a visiting research fellow of Merton College, Oxford, in 2001 he was a Christensen Fellow at St. Catherine's College, Oxford, and Killam Visiting Scholar at the University of Calgary in 2005.

== Professional activities ==
Helliwell has served in a wide range of official advisory posts over the years, including membership on the Royal Commission on National Passenger Transportation between 1989 and 1992, senior advisor to the secretary general of the OECD between 1983 and 1984, chair of economic advisory panel to the Canadian Minister of Finance between 1982 and 1984, and president of the Canadian Economics Association between 1985 and 1986. He was a board member for the Institute for Research in Public Policy between 1999–2007 and he served as a board member of Social Research and Demonstration Corporation between 2002 – 2015. Between 2003 and 2004, he served as special advisor at the Bank of Canada, and between 2002 and 2010, he was on the International Advisory Board for the Centre for International Governance Innovation. He was a member of Canadian National Statistics Council between 2001 and 2015. He was an advisory forum member to the United Kingdom Office of National Statistics, and was on the advisory committee of the Ditchley Foundation. He also served as a member of the Steering Group for the Center for Economic Performance and Arthur A.E. Child Foundation Fellow of the Canadian Institute for Advanced Research.

== Personal life ==
Helliwell lives with his wife, Judith Millie Helliwell, a trained nurse at Royal Victoria Hospital in Montreal. They married in 1969 and have two sons, David and James. They currently live British Columbia, Canada. Over the course of their marriage, they have lived and worked in their respective fields in Cambridge, London, Ottawa, Oxford, Stockholm, Sydney and Paris.

== Honors and awards ==
In 2017, Helliwell was made a Distinguished Fellow of CIFAR. In 2014, on behalf of the World Happiness Report, together with Richard Layard and Jeffrey Sachs, he was granted the International Society for Quality of Life Standards' Award for the Betterment of the Human Condition.

His other awards include:

- Canada Council Doctoral Fellowship, 1962–64
- Killam Senior Research Fellowship, Canada Council, 1970
- Fellow of the Royal Society of Canada, 1976
- Certificate of Merit for Excellence in Teaching, UBC, 1977 (Master Teacher Awards)
- Jacob Biely Research Prize, U.B.C., 1978
- Faculty of Commerce, U.B.C., Distinguished Alumnus Award 1979
- Killam Research Prize, U.B.C., 1987
- Officer of the Order of Canada, 1987
- 125th Anniversary Medal, Canada, 1992
- Honorary Doctor of Letters, University of Guelph, 1994
- U.B.C. 75th Anniversary Award
- Douglas Purvis Prize 1999
- Honorary Doctor of Laws, McMaster University, 2000
- Honorary Doctor of Letters, University of New Brunswick, 2001
- Queen's Golden Jubilee Award, Canada, 2003
- Donner Prize, 2002–3.
- Honorary Doctor of Letters, Waterloo University, 2022

== Speaking engagements ==
Helliwell is a frequent keynote and panel speaker at international conferences and other events. His talks include Using Happiness Research to Better Adapt at TEDx Brentwood College School in 2016, The Truth about Happiness at the OMSSA Human Services Integration Policy Conference in 2013, and Freedom Brings Happiness at the Dalai Lama Center for Peace and Education in 2012. He has also spoken at the World Government Summit in 2017, as a plenary speaker for the Regional Studies Association in 2015, at the Social Identity Conference in 2014, the Gallup Positive Psychology Summit in Washington in 2006, the Gross National Happiness conferences in Nova Scotia in 2005 and Brazil 2009, the Development Conference in Celebration of the Diamond Jubilee of the Indian Statistical Institute in New Delhi in 2007, International Forum on Well-Being and Development Policy in Guadalajara in 2014, European Meetings of the International Positive Psychology Association held in Amsterdam in 2015. In 2017, he was the keynote speaker for the International Society for Quality of Life Studies (ISQOLS) annual conference.

== Publications ==
Helliwell has authored, edited and contributed to numerous articles, books, as well as editorials. He was managing editor for the Canadian Journal of Economics between 1979 and 1982, executive editor of the Journal of Asian Economics between 1995 and 2000, member of editorial board, Canadian Business Economics between 1995 and 2001, founding member of editorial board of the Canadian Public Policy between 1974 and 1977, founding member of editorial board of the Journal of Public Economics between 1974 and 1990, and has been a member of editorial board of economic modeling since 1994.

=== Books – partial bibliography ===
- Well-being and Public Policy (2009) with Ed Diener, Richard Lucas, Ulrich Schimmack
- International Differences in Well-Being (2010) with Daniel Kahneman and Ed Diener
- Globalization and Well-being (2003)
- The Contribution of Human and Social Capital to Sustained Economic Growth and Well-Being (2001)
- How Much Do Borders Matter? Integrating National Economies (1998)
- Long-Run Economic Growth (1996) Edited with Steven Durlauf and Baldev Raj

=== Articles – partial bibliography ===
- Helliwell, John (March 2019). "A Pioneer in Broadening the Use of Subjective Well-Being to Measure and Improve Quality of Life, and in Establishing the Social Sources of Well-Being". Applied Research in Quality of Life. 14 (1): 287–289. doi:10.1007/s11482-019-9707-7.
- Helliwell, John F.; Huang, Haifang; Grover, Shawn; Wang, Shun (December 2018). "Empirical linkages between good governance and national well-being". Journal of Comparative Economics. 46 (4): 1332–1346. doi:10.1016/j.jce.2018.01.004.
- Helliwell, John F.; Wang, Shun; Xu, Jinwen (August 2016). "How Durable are Social Norms? Immigrant Trust and Generosity in 132 Countries". Social Indicators Research. 128 (1): 201–219. doi:10.1007/s11205-015-1026-2.
- Helliwell, John F.; Barrington-Leigh, Christopher P. (August 2010). "Viewpoint: Measuring and understanding subjective well-being". Canadian Journal of Economics. 43 (3): 729–753. doi:10.1111/j.1540-5982.2010.01592.x.
- Baldwin, Robert; Hilton, R. Spence (September 1983). A Technique for Indicating Comparative and Perdicting Changes in Trade Ratios (Report). doi:10.3386/w1198. SSRN 305577.
- Helliwell, John F. (March 2006). "Well-Being, Social Capital and Public Policy: What's New?" (PDF). The Economic Journal. 116 (510): C34–C45. doi:10.1111/j.1468-0297.2006.01074.x.
- Good Governance and National Well-being: What Are the Linkages? (Report). OECD Working Papers on Public Governance. October 24, 2014. doi:10.1787/5jxv9f651hvj-en.
