= Prevention & Treatment =

- Discipline: Psychology
- Language: English
- Edited by: Martin Seligman

Publication details
- History: 1997-2003
- Publisher: American Psychological Association
- Frequency: Irregular

Standard abbreviations
- ISO 4: Prev. Treat.

Indexing
- ISSN: 1522-3736

Links
- Journal homepage

Prevention & Treatment was the first online-only journal published by the American Psychological Association. It was established in 1997 as Treatment, obtaining its current name in 1998. Originally, the American Psychiatric Association was also (collaboratively) involved in the journal's publication, but by 1998 they had withdrawn from this effort. The journal ceased publication at the end of 2003. The founding and only editor-in-chief of the journal was Martin Seligman (University of Pennsylvania).
