= Values in Action Inventory of Strengths =

Proprietary psychological assessment measure

The VIA Inventory of Strengths (VIA-IS), formerly known as the Values in Action Inventory, is a proprietary psychological assessment measure designed to identify an individual's profile of "character strengths".

It was created by Christopher Peterson and Martin Seligman, researchers in the field of positive psychology, in order to operationalize their handbook Character Strengths and Virtues (CSV). The CSV is the positive psychology counterpart to the Diagnostic and Statistical Manual of Mental Disorders (DSM) used in traditional psychology.

Unlike the DSM, which scientifically categorizes human deficits and disorders, the CSV classifies positive human strengths. The CSV helps people recognize and build upon their strengths. This aligns with the overall goal of the positive psychology movement, to make people's lives more fulfilling. People can use the VIA-IS to identify their own positive strengths and learn how to capitalize on them.

== Classification of strengths ==
VIA-IS recognizes 24 character strengths organized under six core virtues:

- Wisdom: creativity, curiosity, judgment, love of learning, perspective
- Courage: bravery, perseverance, honesty, zest
- Humanity: love, kindness, social intelligence
- Justice: teamwork, fairness, leadership
- Temperance: forgiveness, humility, prudence, self-regulation
- Transcendence: appreciation of beauty and excellence, gratitude, hope, humor, spirituality

== Composition and administration ==
The VIA-IS is a 96-question measure of 24 character strengths. On average, an individual will complete the VIA-IS in 10 to 15 minutes. (Previous versions of 240 and 120 questions were criticized for their length.)

Participants are instructed to answer each item on the VIA-IS in terms of "whether the statement describes what you are like". Participants respond according to a five-point Likert scale ranging from (1=very much unlike me, 5=very much like me). Sample items include "I find the world a very interesting place", which gauges curiosity, and "I always let bygone be bygones", which gauges forgiveness.

People can score anywhere from 10 to 50 points for each of the 24 strengths. A higher score on a scale indicates that the participant more strongly identifies with that scale's associated strength. Score reports are delivered to each paying participant at the completion of the survey. Feedback is provided for the signature strengths, but not for the lesser strengths. The results rank order the participant's strengths from 1 to 24, with the top four to seven strengths considered "signature strengths".

== History ==
As a relatively new field of research, positive psychology lacked a common vocabulary for discussing measurable positive traits before 2004. Traditional psychology benefited from the creation of DSM, as it provided researchers and clinicians with the same set of language from which they could talk about the negative. As a first step in remedying this disparity between traditional and positive psychology, Peterson and Seligman set out to identify, organize, and measure character.

They began by defining the notion of character as traits that are possessed by an individual and are stable over time, but can still be impacted by setting and thus are subject to change. They brainstormed with a group of noted positive psychology scholars. They examined ancient cultures (including their religions, politics, education, and philosophies) for information about how people in the past construed human virtue. The researchers looked for virtues that were present across cultures and time. Six core virtues emerged from their analysis: courage, justice, humanity, temperance, transcendence, and wisdom.

Next, Peterson and Seligman proposed a model of classification. The hierarchical system is modeled after the Linnaean classification of species, which ranges from a specific species to more general and broad categories. The six core values are the broadest category and are, "core characteristics valued by moral philosophers and religious thinkers". Peterson and Seligman then moved down the hierarchy to identify character strengths, which are "the psychological processes or mechanisms that define the virtues".

The researchers began identifying individual character strengths by brainstorming with a group of noted positive psychology scholars. Peterson and Seligman then performed an exhaustive literature search for work that directly addresses good character in the domains of, "psychiatry, youth development, philosophy, and psychology". Some individuals who influenced Peterson's and Seligman's choice of strengths include: Abraham Maslow, Erik Erikson, Ellen Greenberger, Marie Jahoda, Carol Ryff, Michael Cawley, Howard Gardner, and Shalom Schwartz. The researchers also looked for virtue-laden messages in popular culture. For example, the researchers examined Hallmark greeting cards, personal ads, graffiti, bumper stickers, and profiles of Pokémon characters.

After identifying dozens of "candidate strengths", the researchers refined their list by subjecting them to a list of ten criteria (Note: CSV defines character strengths as satisfying most of the ten following criteria: contributes to individual fulfillment "for oneself and others"; intrinsically valuable, in an ethical sense (gifts, skills, aptitudes, and expertise can be squandered, but character strengths and virtues cannot); non-rivalrous; not the opposite of a desirable trait (a counterexample is steadfast and flexible, which are opposites but are both commonly seen as desirable); trait-like (habitual patterns that are relatively stable over time); not a combination of the other character strengths in the CSV; personified (at least in the popular imagination) by people made famous through story, song, etc.; observable in child prodigies (though this criterion is not applicable to all character strengths); absent in some individuals; and nurtured by societal norms and institutions) to help them select the final 24 strengths for the CSV. Approximately half of the strengths included in the CSV meet all ten criteria, and half do not. By looking for similarities between candidate strengths, the researchers distributed 24 character strengths between six virtue categories. After creating this a priori organization of traits, the researchers performed, "an exploratory factor analysis of scale scores using varimax rotation," from which five factors emerged. Peterson and Seligman state that they are not as concerned with how the 24 strengths are grouped into virtue clusters because, in the end, these traits are mixed together to form the character of a person.

== Validity and reliability ==
Peterson and Seligman state that all character strengths must be measurable. Of the 24 strengths, most can be assessed using self-report questionnaires, behavioral observation, peer-report methods, and clinical interviews. Three strengths, however, have yet to be reliably assessed: humility, modesty, and bravery. The researchers acknowledge that some strengths are more difficult to assess than others, therefore methods of assessing these strengths are still in-progress.

For each strength, there are typically several measures that could be administered in order to assess a person's trait level for that strength. Time and energy, however, prohibit administering all of the measures for the 24 strengths in one testing session. To solve this problem, Peterson and Seligman designed a new measure, the VIA-IS, to assess all 24 strengths in relatively brief amount of time. Beginning in the fall of 2000, the researchers pilot tested the VIA-IS with a group of 250 adults. The researchers removed items that correlated poorly with the rest of the items in the same scale of interest. Peterson and Seligman repeated this process until Cronbach's alpha for all scales exceeded 0.70. The researchers added three reverse-scored items in each of the 24 scales as well. For the current version of the VIA-IS, test-retest correlations for all scales during a four-month period are > 0.70.

Peterson and Seligman provide limited data on the validity and reliability of the VIA-IS; the only published statistics are those stated above. The researchers say that they will provide the full statistical results of their analysis of the VIA-IS in a future publication. However, other researchers have published studies that challenge the validity of this six-factor structure.

== Empirical findings and limitations ==
Although researchers have not yet examined the validity and reliability of the VIA-IS, they are beginning to look at how the 24 character strengths are distributed within the United States and international populations. Researchers found that, within the United States, the most commonly endorsed strengths are kindness, fairness, honesty, gratitude, and judgment. The lesser strengths demonstrated consistency across states and regions as well: prudence, modesty, and self-regulation. The researchers did not find regional differences in the rank-order of strengths, with the exception of the South demonstrating slightly higher scores for religiousness.

When the rank order of prevalence of character strengths in the U.S. is compared to that of 53 other countries, scientists found the relative pattern of rank ordering did not differ. This finding provides evidence to support Peterson and Seligman's assertion that their classification system is composed of universally acknowledged strengths.

The results of this study have limitations. Respondents to the survey required internet access and literacy in English, as the VIA-IS was mediated by the internet and not translated. This may restrict the extension of these results to non-English speakers. The authors also acknowledged selection bias, stating they sought people who "want to become happier...We would not want to generalize our ﬁndings to people who do not want to become happier".

In an earlier study, researchers administered the English-language version of the VIA-IS to individuals in 40 countries. Worldwide, the following strengths were most associated with positive life satisfaction: hope, zest, gratitude, and love. The researchers called these "strengths of the heart". Strengths associated with knowledge, such as love of learning and curiosity, were least correlated with life satisfaction.

=== United Kingdom ===
Scientists have also performed more in-depth analyses of the VIA-IS when it is applied to populations outside of the United States. Linley and colleagues did not simply compare the rank-order of strengths of the U.S. to other countries. They administered the VIA-IS to 17,056 individuals living in the United Kingdom between 2002 and 2005. Compared to the entire U.K. population, the study's sample was better educated, and was composed of more women and fewer elderly individuals.

The researchers found that as people aged, strength scores tended to increase. Using Pearson's correlations, researchers looked for associations between age and strengths. The following strengths showed the strongest correlations: love of learning, curiosity, forgiveness, self-regulation, and fairness. Humor did not follow this pattern, and was negatively correlated with age.

In terms of statistically significant gender differences, women demonstrated higher scores for interpersonal strengths (kindness, love, and social intelligence) and appreciation of beauty and gratitude. Men scored significantly higher than women on creativity. For men and women, four of the top five signature strengths were the same: open-mindedness, fairness, curiosity, and love of learning.

When the means and standard deviations were broken down by gender and age, they were consistent with those reported by U.S. samples. The rank ordering of the prevalence of strengths was comparable to the patterns found in the U.S. and other international samples. Once again, research supports Peterson and Seligman's assertion that the strengths listed in the CSV and VIA-IS are present in the majority of cultures.

An important limitation of this study, as with all studies that collect data via the internet, is that the samples tend to be more educated and from higher socioeconomic background because these individuals are more likely to have access and knowledge of the internet.

=== Japan ===
Shimai and colleagues tested the applicability of a translated version of the VIA-IS to a sample in Japan. The researchers administered the VIA-IS to 308 young adults from Japan and 1,099 young adults from the U.S. The scientists translated the VIA-IS into Japanese and then back to English in order to be examined by the original creators of the VIA-IS. They confirmed that the Japanese version of the VIA-IS demonstrated face validity, test-retest reliability and internal consistency before administering it to young adults.

The researchers found that top-ranked strengths, in terms of prevalence, for young adults in Japan, were similar to those of young adults in the U.S. The percentage of people who scored high or low on each character strength were similar between the two countries. The scientists did not find a significant variation in the pattern of gender differences between the United States and Japan. Women in both countries were more likely than men to score highly on the strengths of kindness, love, gratitude, teamwork, and appreciation of beauty, whereas men in both countries were more likely score highly on the strengths of open-mindedness, perspective, creativity, self-regulation, and bravery. The correlations between specific strengths and happiness outcomes were consistent as well. The strengths of zest, curiosity, gratitude, and hope were significantly positively correlated with subjective measures of happiness for both populations.

Differences between the young adults in Japan and the U.S. emerged as well. The rank-order of religiousness was the biggest difference between the cultures. For American young adults, religiousness was on average the 14th-most-prevalent strength. For Japanese young adults, religiousness was, on average, the 19th-most-prevalent strength. The researchers attributed this finding to the fact that some of the items on the VIA-IS that assess religiousness were based on Western connotations of religiosity (e.g. monotheistic traditions).

A notable limitation of this study is that the researchers examined young adults, rather than the population at-large. According to the researchers, young adults in Japan are more active participants in a more global, Americanized culture than the older generations. This could explain the commonalities found between young adults in Japan and the U.S.

Shimai and colleagues demonstrated that the VIA-IS can be successfully and accurately translated into other languages. When this is done, however, researchers need to ensure that the items on the scale are not culturally biased toward Western concepts.

== Character Strengths and Virtues ==
Character Strengths and Virtues: A Handbook and Classification
- Author: Christopher Peterson and Martin Seligman
- Publisher: American Psychological Association and Oxford University Press
- Publication date: 2004
- Pages: 800
- ISBN: 0-19-516701-5
- OCLC: 803516802

Character Strengths and Virtues: A Handbook and Classification (CSV) is a 2004 book by Peterson and Seligman. It attempts to present a measure of humanist ideals of virtue in an empirical, rigorously scientific manner, intended to provide a theoretical framework for practical applications for positive psychology. It is intended as the positive psychology counterpart to the DSM, classifying positive human strengths rather than deficits and disorders.

The 800-page book is organized in three sections. The first lays out the history and reasons for classifying strengths and virtues. The second comprises chapters for each of the 24 character strengths, with bibliographies and suggested research avenues. The third section examines assessment and the validity of self-reporting surveys.

In an American Journal of Psychiatry review, C. Robert Cloninger wrote that the book's major accomplishment was to show that virtues could be measured in a "rigorous scientific manner".

== Applications ==
One of the major goals of positive psychology is to help people "cultivate and sustain the good life". The VIA-IS provides a practical measure that can be used to evaluate the efficacy of positive interventions. As one example, consider the thousands of people who participate in life coaching and character education programs every year. Strengths of character are often the outcome of interest, yet these programs do not employ a rigorous outcome measure in order to gauge efficacy. Researchers propose that if these programs used the VIA-IS, then they may discover unanticipated benefits of their interventions and that this would facilitate objective evaluation of its outcome.

Peterson and Seligman suggest that the VIA-IS could be used as a way to help people identify their signature strengths. With this knowledge, people could then begin to capitalize and build upon their signature strengths. Positive psychologists argue that the VIA-IS should not be used as a way to identify your 'lesser strengths' or weaknesses. Their approach departs from the medical model of traditional psychology, which focuses on fixing deficits. In contrast, positive psychologists emphasize that people should focus and build upon what they are doing well.

== Criticism ==
Many studies have checked the factor structure of the CSV, on which the VIA-IS is based.

Using a second order factor analysis, Macdonald and colleagues found that the 24 strengths did not fit into the six higher-order virtues model proposed in the CSV. None of the clusters of characters strengths that they found resembled the structure of the six virtue clusters of strengths. The researchers noted that many of the VIA character strengths cross-loaded onto multiple factors. Rather, the strengths were best represented by a one and four factor model. A one factor model would mean that the strengths are best accounted for by, "one overarching factor," such as a global trait of character. A four factor model more closely resembles the "Big Five" model of personality. The character strengths in the four factor model could be organized into the following four groups: Niceness, Positivity, Intellect, and Conscientiousness.

Peterson and Seligman conducted a factor analysis and found that a five factor model, rather than their six hierarchical virtues model, best organized the strengths. Their study, however, did not include five of the character strengths in the results of their analysis. The researchers most likely did this because their results were plagued by the problem of strengths cross-loading on to multiple factors, similar to what occurred in Macdonald and colleagues' study. Clearly, empirical evidence casts doubt on the link proposed by Peterson and Seligman between the 24 strengths and associated six higher-order virtues.

Brdar and Kashdan used more precise statistical tools to build upon the findings of the two earlier studies. They found that a four factor model (Interpersonal Strengths, Vitality, Fortitude, and Cautiousness) explained 60% of the variance. One large, overarching factor explained 50% of the variance. The four factors found by Brdar and Kashdan are similar to the four factors found by Macdonald and colleagues. Once again, Brdar and Kashdan found that the 24 strengths did not fall into the six higher-order virtues proposed by Peterson and Seligman. The correlations found between many of the strengths demonstrates that each strength is not distinct, which contradicts the claims made by the creators of the VIA-IS.

Robert E. McGrath modified the inventory by adding four new scales (Positivity, Future-Mindedness, Receptivity, Intellectual Pursuits) and removing four previous scales of Leadership, Zest, Hope, and Gratitude. He suggested five virtues (second-order factors) instead of six hypothesized virtues by Peterson and Seligman. These virtues were: Interpersonal, Emotional, Intellectual, Restraint, and Future Orientation.

These factors / virtues resembled the ones identified in previous factor-analytic studies which have found very different factor structures than the ones hypothesized theoretically. Therefore, substantial evidence stands against original scale structures, in terms of nature of factors and their structures regarding content of items. McGrath also found that a lot of items that were part of original character strengths inventory (VIA-IS) were no more belonging to the same scales after confirmatory factor analyses. His new scales had some overlaps with previous scales, but had many new items from other scales that loaded onto them instead of previous ones. McGrath indicated that the original scale structure needs several modifications and future studies would yield a better structure for a second-generation model of strengths.

Caution should be taken in interpreting the results from these four studies as their samples differ in age and country of origin.

== See also ==
- Appreciative inquiry – Organizational model
- Broaden-and-build – Theory of positive emotions
- Cardinal virtues – Virtues of mind and character
- Flow – Full immersion in an activity
- Happiness – Positive emotional state
- Meaning of life – Philosophical and spiritual question
- Positive psychology – Approach of psychological scientific study
- Science of morality – Forms of ethical naturalism
- Value (personal and cultural) – Personal value, basis for ethical action
- Virtue ethics – Normative ethical theories
  - Aristotle's Nicomachean Ethics – Work on ethics by Aristotle
  - Aquinas's Summa Theologica – Theological treatise by Thomas Aquinas
