= Zest (positive psychology) =

One's thirst and excitement for living

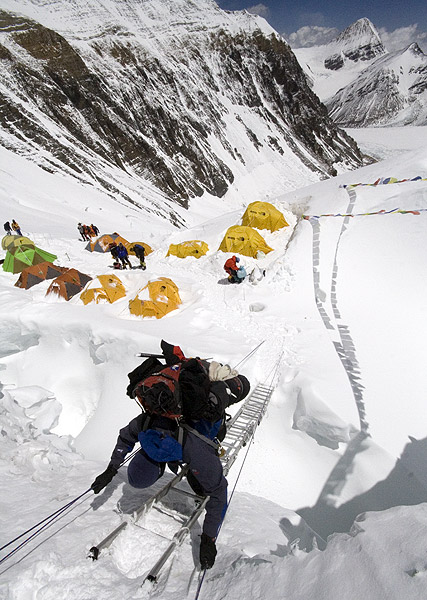
Mountaineers who climb Mount Everest, such as this climber, could be said to have zest, as they have "motivation in challenging situations or tasks".

In positive psychology, zest (or enthusiasm) is among the discrete strengths people possess. Having zest means treating life as an adventure and feeling motivated in challenging situations. People with zest display enthusiasm, excitement, and energy as they tackle life's tasks. Zest is a component of the virtue of courage in some positive psychology paradigms.

== Measurement ==
The VIA-IS is a self-report questionnaire that assesses the strength with which respondents answer strength-relevant statements about themselves on a 1–5 Likert scale. The following statements on the VIA-IS are designed to measure a person's zest:

- I look forward to each new day.
- I cannot wait to get started on a project.
- I want to fully participate in life, not just view it from the sidelines.

== Criticism ==
As with many other constructs in positive psychology, it is difficult to quantify zest. Other traits like socioeconomic status, which can be measured by household income, or constructs like fear, which can be quantified by changes in heart rate, skin conductance, and pupil dilation, have more well-defined and widely accepted methods of measure.

Much of the research on character strengths is done via self-reports. A self-report study is one in which participants are simply asked to report their own feelings, thoughts, or assessments. Self-report research is problematic. For one thing, self-reported measures are subjective. Also, people may misrepresent themselves or misinterpret the questions posed to them.

Because of such problems, the data behind this research is not as scientifically convincing as it could be. Positive psychology research aims to develop more objective measures for topics such as zest to address this.

== Work ==
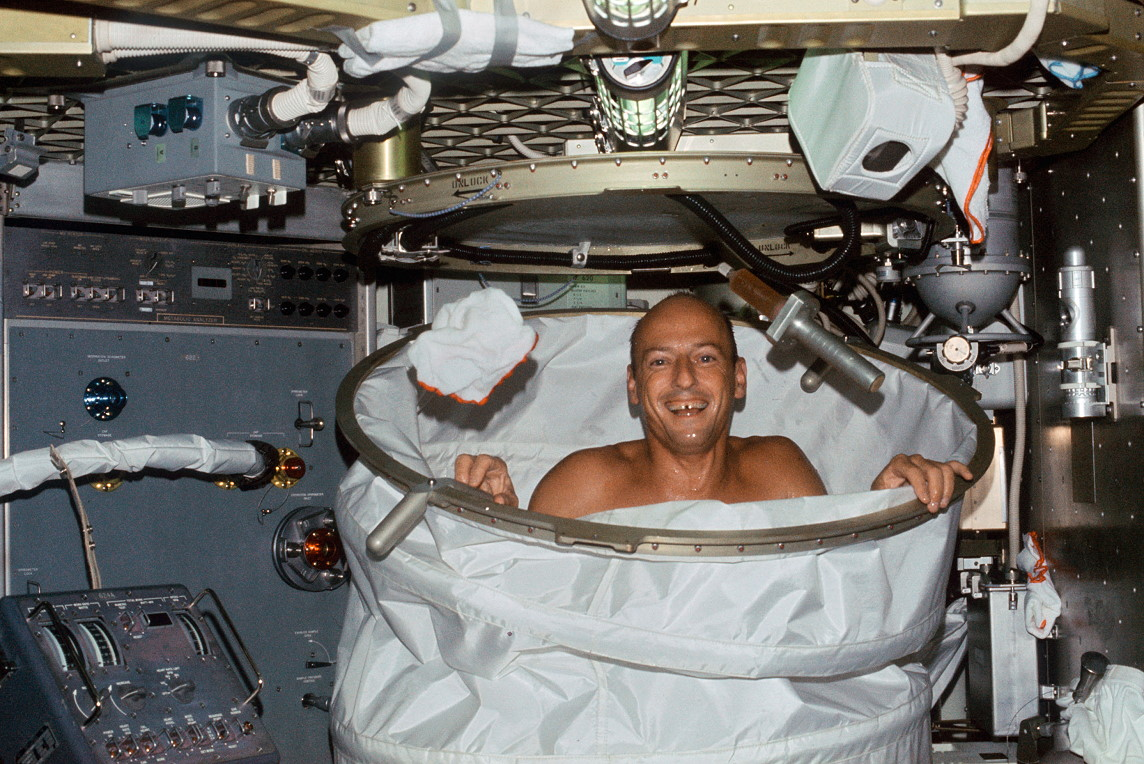
NASA astronaut Pete Conrad taking a shower aboard the Skylab space station.

Zest can be promoted in the workplace with the aim of contributing to a more positive approach to life by workers. This can indirectly affect their anticipation, excitement, and energy in the workplace and thereby perhaps increase their productivity.

In one study, 9,803 employed adults responded to an internet survey which measured zest, orientation to work as a calling, and satisfaction to work and life in general. For many employees surveyed, work was a calling and a satisfaction. The study found that professionals had the highest zest, while clerical workers and homemakers were the least zestful. Professionals and homemakers were more likely to view their job as a calling, while clerical workers were the least likely to do so. Clerical workers displayed among the lowest levels of zest because in most instances they viewed their work as merely a stepping-stone to some better calling. The results of this study agree with many other studies.

Zest may be contagious, like many other strengths of character. Zest is connected to group morale, and so some studies from a positive organizational perspective emphasize zest. Psychologists have discerned two ways of promoting zest in workers: physical fitness and health set the tone for zest, and zest can be sustained through hope and optimism. Depression is a well-documented enemy of zest, and it negatively affects productivity and physical health alike. The prevention or reduction of depression among workers might also increase their sense that their work is a calling.

Zest is linked to psychological well-being, which is also crucial in a work organization. Psychological well-being predicts better job performance, less absenteeism, and less employee turnover.

A 2009 study of 228 schoolteachers in Hong Kong indicated that zest was often associated with positive emotions and higher levels of life satisfaction. Cultivating zest in school teachers might help combat teacher burnout. Zest correlates with healthy working behaviors such as ambition, creativity, persistence, and leadership. This suggests that interventions that nurture zest may improve work environments, increase work satisfaction (as well as general life satisfaction), and decrease workplace burnout (the loss of productivity and enthusiasm for working).

== Positive youth development ==
Zest is important to character development. Promotion of character strengths such as zest helps children experience fewer psychological problems such as depression and anxiety disorders. This suggests that the cultivation of zest may buffer against mental illness.

Research has examined the correlation between zest, well-being and academic achievement.

== Life satisfaction and zest ==
Higher levels of zest correlate with higher levels of life satisfaction among adults as well as youths. Zest may be associated with higher life satisfaction because it is associated with living in the "here and now." The definition of zest might make also a correlation with life satisfaction tautological: It is difficult to imagine zestful people who are often unhappy. Increasing one's zest is likely to also increase one's ability to be habitually happy.

== Demographics ==
Zest is among those character strengths that are more common among youths than adults. This may reflect the influence of social and cognitive maturation and certain needs during different developmental periods

One study indicated slight gender differences in levels of zest. For women, life satisfaction was predicted by zest, gratitude, hope, appreciation of beauty, and love. Men's life satisfaction was predicted by creativity, perspective, fairness, and humor. These findings confirm gender stereotypes and suggest that life satisfaction may follow from living aligned with those strengths especially valued in one's culture.

== Zest and mental state ==
On the VIA-Youth subscale zest is correlated with higher levels of neuroticism.

Post-traumatic growth appears to boost zest; measured levels of zest increase with each traumatic event. This suggests that people may be more resilient than existing theories account for, given the correlation between traumatic events and increases in character strengths such as zest

== Application ==
One way to cultivate zest is acting "as if"—living a "faith-based" rather than an "evidence-based" life. This means believing in things that there may not be much evidence for or proof of. Additionally, adopting strong body language may help, as well as "faking it until you make it" (acting as though one has more zest until that increased enthusiasm is a reality).

Groups that were trained to cultivate strengths that are highly correlated with life satisfaction (such as zest) had significant improvements in self-reported life satisfaction after the training.

== See also ==
- Character Strengths and Virtues
- Flow
