= Enthusiasm =

Intense enjoyment, interest or approval towards something

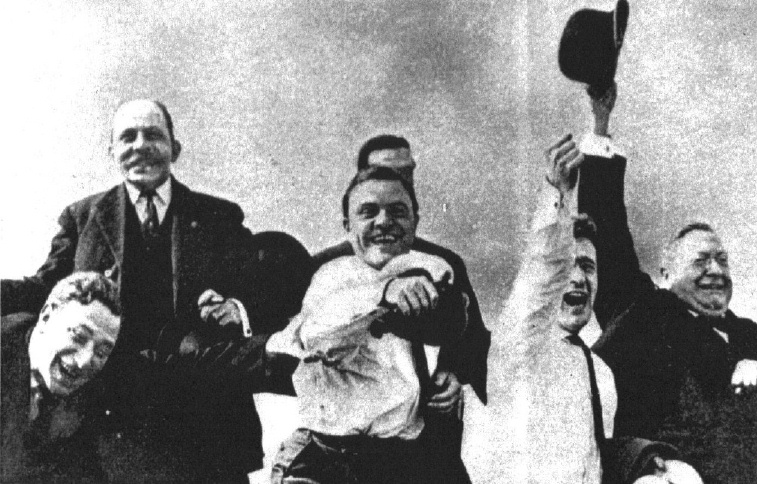
Men reacting enthusiastically

In modern usage, "enthusiasm" refers to intense enjoyment, interest, or approval expressed by a person. The term is allegedly related to playfulness, inventiveness, optimism, zest, verve, and high energy. People can often characterise the modern version of enthusiasm as "infectious" or "contagious", and sometimes even more metaphorically as a virus in its own right.

The word once applied, in accordance with its etymology, to persons possessed or inspired by a god, or to people who exhibited intense piety.

== Historical usage ==
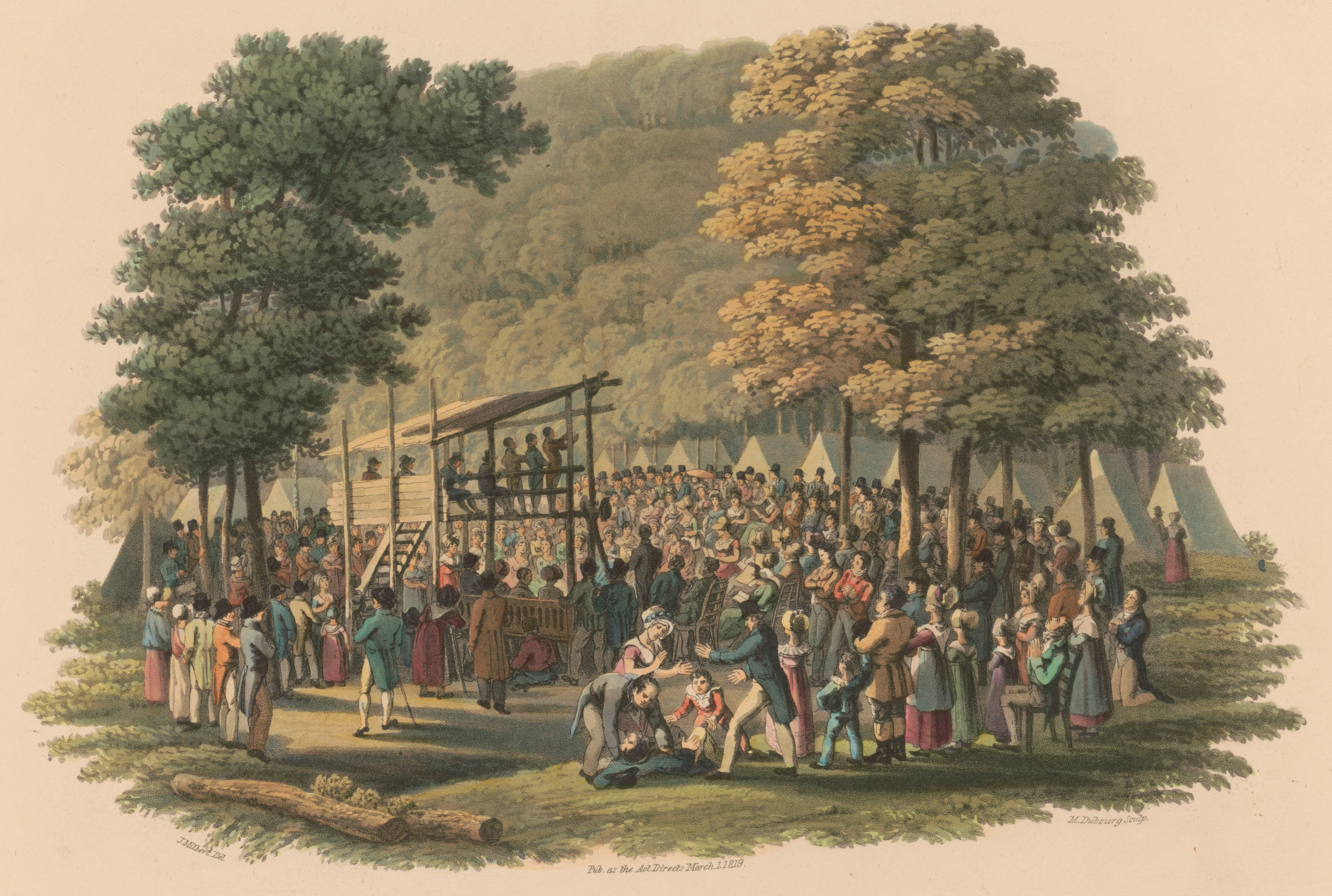
Methodist preachers have been known for their enthusiasm in promulgating the doctrines of the new birth and entire sanctification to the public at events such as tent revivals and camp meetings, which they believe is the reason that God raised them up into existence.

The word enthusiasm originates from the Greek ἐνθουσιασμός from ἐν (en, 'in') and θεός (theós, 'god'), meaning 'inspired or possessed by [a] god'. Applied by the Greeks to manifestations of divine possession, by Apollo (as in the case of the Pythia), or by Dionysus (as in the case of the Bacchantes and Maenads), the term enthusiasm was also used in a transferred or figurative sense. Socrates taught that the inspiration of poets is a form of enthusiasm. The term was confined to a belief in religious inspiration, or to intense religious fervor or emotion.

From this, a Syrian sect of the fourth century was known as the Enthusiasts. They believed that "by perpetual prayer, ascetic practices, and contemplation, man could become inspired by the Holy Spirit, in spite of the ruling evil spirit, which the fall had given to him". From their belief in the efficacy of prayer, they were also known as Euchites.

Several Protestant Christian denominations that emerged in the 16th and 17th centuries, especially those who hold revivals, were called enthusiastic.

=== Pejorative use ===
During the years that immediately followed the Glorious Revolution, "enthusiasm" was a British pejorative term for advocacy of any political or religious cause in public, i.e. fanaticism. Such "enthusiasm" was seen in the time around 1700 as the cause of the previous century's English Civil War and its attendant atrocities, and thus it was an absolute social sin to remind others of the war by engaging in enthusiasm. The Royal Society bylaws stipulated that any person discussing religion or politics at a Society meeting was to be summarily ejected for being an "enthusiast."

During the 18th century, popular Methodists such as John Wesley or George Whitefield were accused of blind enthusiasm, a charge against which they defended themselves by distinguishing fanaticism from "religion of the heart." Methodists who enthusiastically preach about and experience the new birth (first work of grace) and entire sanctification (second work of grace) often have emotional experiences.

== See also ==
- Artistic inspiration – Unconscious burst of creativity
- Connoisseur – Subject-matter expert
- Emotional contagion – Spontaneous spread of emotions among a group
- Entheogen – Psychoactive substance that induces spiritual experiences
- Euphoria – Intense feelings of well-being
- Fan (person) – Enthusiastically devoted person
- Flow (psychology) – Full immersion in an activity
- Motivation – Inner state causing goal-directed behavior
- Zest (positive psychology) – One's thirst and excitement for living
