= Jan-Emmanuel De Neve =

Belgian economist and professor

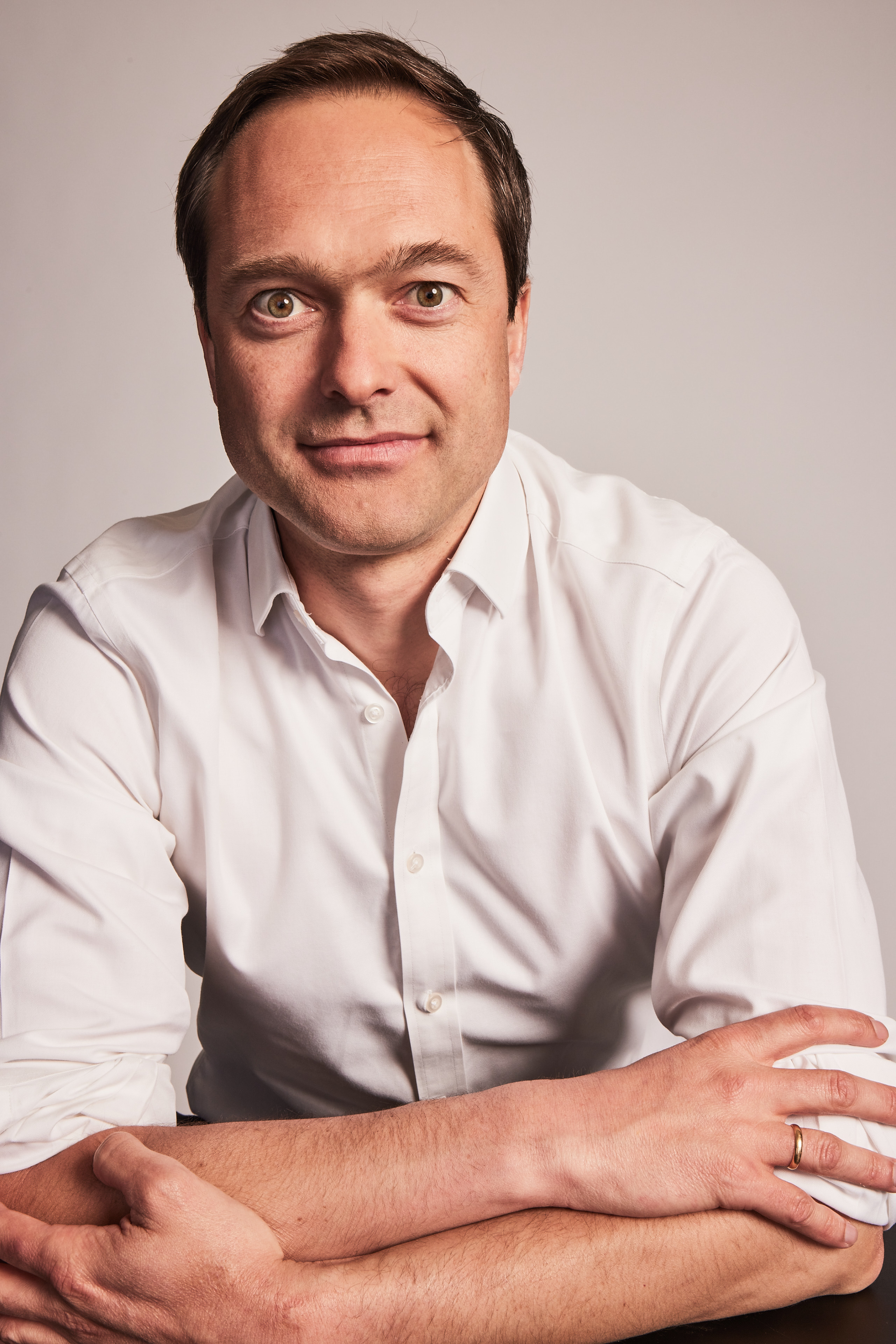
- De Neve in 2024
- Born: 14 March 1979 (age 47)

Academic background
- Education: Harvard University (MPP); London School of Economics (PhD)
- Influences: John Kenneth Galbraith; Richard Layard

Academic work
- School or tradition: Behavioral economics
- Institutions: University of Oxford

Jan-Emmanuel De Neve (born 14 March 1979) is a Belgian economist and University of Oxford professor where he directs the Wellbeing Research Centre. He is also the KSI Fellow and Vice-Principal of Harris Manchester College, one of the constituent colleges of the University of Oxford. He is known for his research on the economics of wellbeing which has led to new insights into the relationship between wellbeing and income, productivity, firm performance, and economic growth.

De Neve is the co-editor of the World Happiness Report, which is a publication of the Wellbeing Research Centre in partnership with Gallup and the UN Sustainable Development Solutions Network. De Neve is also the co-founder of the World Wellbeing Movement.

De Neve currently guides the development of the world's largest study on wellbeing at work in collaboration with the global job search site Indeed with over 25 million surveys completed so far. Their workplace wellbeing survey approach has been widely adopted including by S&P Global as part of the annual Corporate Sustainability Assessment underpinning ESG ratings.

De Neve and Richard Layard co-authored the first major textbook on wellbeing science. It was published in 2023 by Cambridge University Press and praised by Nobel laureate Daniel Kahneman as the "best book I have read in a long time - a fountain of knowledge and an inspiring call to action." The book is made freely available by way of open access and has been illustrated by visual artist David Shrigley.

== COVID-19 pandemic ==
De Neve served on The Lancet COVID-19 Commission and wrote in the British Medical Journal proposing to assess lockdown policy options in terms of their net effect on years of human wellbeing, or wellbeing-years (WELLBYs). In May 2020, in an interview with Flemish TV Channel VRT he noted that the economic and mental health consequences of the lockdown disproportionally fall on the younger generations while the health benefits of the lockdown mostly benefit the elderly. His remarks stirred a public debate on the need for targeted fiscal support. De Neve elaborated on this in an interview with Trends Magazine and in pieces for the main Belgian newspapers Le Soir and De Standaard.

== Behavioral insights and tax compliance ==
Starting in 2014, De Neve collaborated with the Ministry of Finance in Belgium to apply behavioral insights to tax compliance. This led to a series of experiments that varied the communication of the tax authority with all income tax-filers in Belgium. This collaboration has become a pioneering example of evidence-based policy making in Europe and its results were published in the Journal of Political Economy. Addressing the Federal Parliament, the Belgian Minister of Finance noted that the trials run in 2015 resulted in €30 million revenue collected more quickly compared with previous years and €4 million additional revenue with €1 million saved in enforcement costs. The cumulative impact over the ensuing years is estimated to have accelerated the payment of over €100 million in late taxes leading to structural gains in tax revenue and administrative cost savings.

== Awards ==
His research was selected among "The Management Ideas that Mattered Most" by Harvard Business Review and he was awarded the Ruut Veenhoven Award by Erasmus Universiteit of Rotterdam for his contributions to the scientific study of happiness.

== Education ==
De Neve was a Fulbright Scholar at the Harvard Kennedy School where he obtained a Master in Public Policy and was awarded the 2007 Ellen S. Raphael Award for intellectual and personal qualities. He received his PhD from the London School of Economics in 2011 with a thesis titled Essays in Political Economy and Voting Behaviour.

== Personal life ==
De Neve is married to Belgian Architect Aude-Line Dulière, winner of the 2018 Wheelwright Prize.

== Books ==
- "Why Workplace Wellbeing Matters" (2025) Harvard Business Press. www.whyworkplacewellbeingmatters.com
- "Wellbeing: Science and Policy" (2023) Cambridge University Press. www.cambridge.org/wellbeing

== Selected research publications ==
- Bellet, Clement, Jan-Emmanuel De Neve, and George Ward (2023), "Does Employee Happiness Have an Impact on Productivity?" Management Science. https://doi.org/10.1287/mnsc.2023.4766.
- De Neve, Jan-Emmanuel, Clement Imbert, Maarten Luts, Johannes Spinnewijn, and Teodora Tsankova (2021), "How to improve tax compliance? Evidence from population-wide experiments in Belgium" The Journal of Political Economy. 129(5): 1425–1463.
- De Neve, Jan-Emmanuel, and Jeffrey Sachs (2020), "The SDGs and human well-being: A global analysis of synergies, trade-offs, and regional differences" Scientific Reports. Sci Rep 10, 15113."
- De Neve, Jan-Emmanuel, Andrew Clark, Christian Krekel, Richard Layard, and Gus O'Donnell (2020), "Taking a wellbeing years approach to policy choice" The British Medical Journal. BMJ 2020;371:m3853
- De Neve, Jan-Emmanuel, George Ward, Femke De Keulenaer, George Kavetsos, Michael Norton, and Bert Van Landeghem (2018), "The asymmetric experience of positive and negative economic growth: global evidence using subjective well-being data" The Review of Economics and Statistics. Vol 100(2), pp. 362–375.
- Charpentier, Caroline, Jan-Emmanuel De Neve, Xinyi Li, Jonathan Roiser, and Tali Sharot (2016), "Models of affective decision-making: How do feelings predict choice?" Psychological Science. 27(6), pp. 763–75.
- Social Science Genetic Association Consortium (2016), "Genetic variants associated with subjective well-being, depressive symptoms and neuroticism identified through genome-wide analyses" Nature Genetics. 48, pp. 624–633.
- De Neve, Jan-Emmanuel and Andrew J. Oswald (2012), "Estimating the influence of life satisfaction and positive affect on later income using sibling fixed-effects" Proceedings of the National Academy of Sciences (PNAS). Vol. 109, No. 49, pp. 19953– 19958.
