= Christopher Peterson (psychologist) =

American psychologist (1950–2012)

Christopher Peterson (February 18, 1950 – October 9, 2012) was the Arthur F. Thurnau professor of psychology and organizational studies at the University of Michigan in Ann Arbor, Michigan, and the former chair of the clinical psychology area. He was science director of the VIA Institute on Character, and co-author of Character Strengths and Virtues for the classification of character strengths. He was a member of the Positive Psychology Steering Committee and the International Positive Psychology Association board of directors, a senior fellow at the Positive Psychology Center and a lecturer for the Master of Applied Positive Psychology program at the University of Pennsylvania. He was a co-editor of Applied Psychology: Health and Well-being and the Positive Psychology Book Series Editor for Oxford University Press.

He is noted for his work in the study of optimism, health, character, well-being and one of the founders of positive psychology. He has published over 300 academic publications. In 2003 the Institute for Scientific Information (ISI) named him among the 100 most frequently cited psychologists in the past 20 years. In 2010, Dr. Peterson won the 2010 Golden Apple Award for Outstanding Teaching – the most prestigious teaching award at the University of Michigan.

== Classification of psychological disorders ==
=== Disorders of Wisdom and Knowledge ===
Strength	Absence	Opposite	Exaggeration
Creativity	Conformity	Triteness	Eccentricity
Curiosity/Interest	Disinterest	Boredom	Morbid curiosity/Nosiness
Judgment/Critical thinking	Unreflectiveness	Gullibility	Cynicism
Love of learning	Complacency	Orthodoxy	Know-it-all-ism
Perspective	Shallowness	Foolishness	None

=== Disorders of Courage ===
Strength	Absence	Opposite	Exaggeration
Bravery	Fright/Chicken Little-ism	Cowardice	Foolhardiness
Persistence	Laziness	Helplessness	Obsessiveness
Authenticity/Honesty	Phoniness	Deceipt	Righteousness
Vitality	Restraint	Lifelessness	Hyperactivity

=== Disorders of Love ===
Strength	Absence	Opposite	Exaggeration
Intimacy	Isolation/Autism	Loneliness/Avoidance of commitment	Emotional promiscuity
Kindness	Indifference	Cruelty/Mean-spiritedness	Intrusiveness
Social Intelligence	Obtuseness/Cluelessness	Self-deception	Psychobabble

=== Disorders of Justice ===
Strength	Absence	Opposite	Exaggeration
Citizenship	Selfishness	Narcissism	Chauvinism
Fairness	Partisanship	Prejudice	Detachment
Leadership	Compliance	Disruptiveness/Sabotage	Despotism

=== Disorders of Temperance ===
Strength	Absence	Opposite	Exaggeration
Forgiveness/Mercy	Mercilessness	Vengefulness	Permissiveness
Humility/Modesty	Footless Self-esteem	Arrogance	Self-deprecation
Prudence	Sensation seeking	Recklessness	Prudishness/Stuffiness
Self-regulation	Self-indulgence	Impulsivity	Inhibition

=== Disorders of Transcendence ===
Strength	Absence	Opposite	Exaggeration
Appreciation of beauty/Excellence	Oblivion	Schadenfreude-ism	Snobbery
Gratitude	Rugged individualism	Entitlement	Ingratiation
Hope	Present orientation	Pessimism/Despair	Pollyannaism
Humor	Humorlessness	Dourness	Buffoonery
Spirituality	Anomie	Alienation	Fanaticism

== Bibliography includes ==
- Character Strengths and Virtues: A Handbook and Classification, by Christopher Peterson & Martin E.P. Seligman
- Peterson, C., & Seligman, M.E.P. (2002). The VIA classification of strengths. Cincinnati: Values in Action Institute
- A Primer in Positive Psychology, by Christopher Peterson (Textbook). 2006
- Peterson, C., Maier, S.F., & Seligman, M.E.P. (1993). Learned helplessness: A theory for the age of personal control. New York: Oxford.
- Peterson, C., & Bossio, L.M. (1991). Health and optimism. New York: Free Press.
- Peterson, Christopher; Seif, Aliakbar; Jahangiri, Hamideh (2020). Psychology The Past To Present (2 Volumes), volume 1 volume 2 Scholars’ Press.
