= Ed Diener =

American psychologist (1946–2021)

- Born: July 25, 1946; Glendale, California, US
- Died: April 27, 2021 (aged 74); Salt Lake City, Utah, US
- Occupations: Writer, psychologist
- Writing career
- Subject: Happiness
- Website: eddiener.com

Edward Francis Diener (July 25, 1946 – April 27, 2021) was an American psychologist and author. Diener was a professor of psychology at the University of Utah and the University of Virginia, and Joseph R. Smiley Distinguished Professor Emeritus at the University of Illinois, as well as a senior scientist for the Gallup Organization. He is noted for his three decades of research on happiness, including work on temperament and personality influences on well-being, theories of well-being, income and well-being, cultural influences on well-being, and the measurement of well-being. As shown on Google Scholar as of April 2021, Diener's publications have been cited over 392,000 times.

For his fundamental research on the subject, Diener was nicknamed Dr. Happiness. Researchers he has worked with include Daniel Kahneman, Martin Seligman, and Shigehiro Oishi.

== Background ==
Diener was born in 1946 in Glendale, California, and grew up on a farm in the San Joaquin Valley of California.

He attended San Joaquin Memorial High School in Fresno. And subsequently received his BA in psychology in 1968 from California State University, Fresno and a Ph.D. in psychology from the University of Washington in 1974. He was a professor at the University of Illinois Urbana-Champaign for 34 years, retiring in 2008 from active teaching.

He held the Smiley chair as the Joseph R. Smiley Distinguished Professor of Psychology at the University of Illinois. In 2010 he received honorary doctorates from the Free University of Berlin and Eureka College. He won the distinguished scientist award from the International Society for Quality of Life Studies, as well as the Jack Block award for outstanding contributions to personality psychology.

Diener's wife Carol is a clinical psychologist and attorney. His daughters Marissa and Mary Beth are psychologists, as is his son, Robert.

Diener died on April 27, 2021, in Salt Lake City of bladder cancer.

== Happiness research ==
Diener, also known as Dr. Happiness, is one of the lead researchers in the field of subjective well-being. Subjective well-being (SWB), as Diener et al. define it, is how people evaluate their lives – both at the moment and for longer periods such as for the past year. These evaluations include people's emotional reactions to events, their moods, and judgments they form about their life satisfaction, fulfilment, and satisfaction with domains such as marriage and work.

In 2002, Diener conducted a study at the University of Illinois with Martin Seligman, finding that "the most salient characteristics shared by the 10% of students with the highest levels of happiness and the fewest signs of depression were their strong ties to friends and family and commitment to spending time with them." Diener has said "It is important to work on social skills, close interpersonal ties and social support in order to be happy."

=== Temperament and personality influences on SWB ===
Diener has found that the correlations between SWB and extraversion and neuroticism are stronger than the correlations with any demographic predictor or major life circumstance that has thus been studied. One aspect of individual differences in well-being that his research on personality and SWB has been focused on is emotional reactivity/ reward theory. Diener discovered that there are reasons for greater SWB among extraverts beyond the fact that they spend more time with others, a hypothesis popularized by other researchers. He found that the more active reward system in extraverts is a greater influence than the social or nonsocial aspect of a situation. This is evident in his research showing that the pleasantness of a situation is a more important factor than the social or nonsocial aspect in determining extraverts' enjoyment. His longitudinal studies reveal that extraverts are happier whether living solitarily or with others, working in social or nonsocial job environments, and living in large cities or rural areas.

=== Objective benefits of SWB ===
Diener proposed that happiness has benefits beyond "feeling good". In a paper published in 2011, Diener and Chan reviewed eight types of evidence that support a causal relationship from SWB to health and longevity. After examining results from longitudinal studies, meta-analysis, animal experiments, human experiments and natural quasi-experiments, Diener and Chan concluded that the evidence overwhelmingly supports the argument that high SWB causes better health and longevity (Diener & Chan, 2011). Diener also summarized the pathways, through which happiness affects health and longevity. Among which are SWB's influence on physiological processes underlying health and disease, on practice of good health behaviors, and on fulfilling social relationships. Meanwhile, Diener and his colleagues showed that higher SWB leads to higher income, better job performance, more creativity and productivity. They also illustrated that happiness produces greater self-control, more pro-social behaviors and higher-quality social relationships (DeNeve, Diener, Tay, & Xuereb, 2013). In short, happiness is functional.

=== Optimum level of SWB ===
Despite the advantages of happiness for functioning, one line of Diener's research concerns the question “can people be too happy”. Using large survey data and longitudinal data, Diener and his colleagues showed that too much happiness could be detrimental to one's income, education and political participation (Oishi, Diener,& Lucas, 2007). The most successful people in terms of these three variables are those who experience moderate to high levels of happiness, but not extremely high happiness. However, the very happiest people are most successful in terms of close relationships and volunteer work.

=== Limits to adaptation of well-being and set point change ===
The traditional adaption theory of Well-Being suggests that people have a pre-determined set point for happiness (Brickman & Campbell, 1971). Any life event, positive or negative, can only have transitory influences on SWB. Diener's research challenged the theory by showing that people do not adapt completely to all events. Some powerful events or circumstances can change people's emotional set points (Diener, Lucas, & Scollon, 2006). In particular, people who lose their spouses or jobs cannot fully recover many years after the events (Lucas, Clark, Georgellis, & Diener, 2004). The discovery has profound implications. First, it explains the enormous differences of SWB between nations across the globe (Diener, Tay, & Oishi, 2013). Second, it sheds light on the possibility for interventions, both at the individual-level and the societal level, to produce lasting boosts in happiness. Diener and his colleagues also discovered individual differences in adaptation. For instance, some people adapt quickly to the joy of marriage, while others experience a long-lasting effect on their SWB.

=== Income and SWB ===
Using longitudinal data from over 100 countries, Diener and his colleagues showed that rich countries are in general happier than poor countries (Diener, Tay, & Oishi, 2013). Also, life satisfaction for most countries goes up as they become wealthier over time. Diener identified three factors that influence the relationship between income and SWB. Namely, rising income most likely results in higher SWB when it leads to greater optimism, financial satisfaction and household material prosperity among citizens. Furthermore, Diener and his colleagues investigated the relationship between income and different elements of SWB. They illustrated that income has stronger influence on people's evaluation of their lives than the positive or negative emotions they experience over time (Diener, Kahneman, Tov, & Arora, 2010). The study points to the necessity to evaluate different elements of SWB separately instead of treating happiness as a single entity.

=== Culture influences on SWB ===
In recent years, Diener conducted major studies looking at the role of culture in explaining the international differences of SWB. One important finding is that predictors of SWB may differ across cultures (Tov & Diener, 2007). For example, the association between self-esteem and life satisfaction is much stronger in individualist culture than in collectivistic culture (Diener & Diener, 1995; Oishi, Diener, Lucas, & Suh, 1999). Diener and his colleagues also discovered a cultural congruence effect such that people are happier if their characteristics match the cultural norms (Fulmer et al., 2010). For instance, religious people are much happier than nonreligious people in very religious nations or regions, but such a difference disappears in nonreligious nations or regions (Diener, Tay, & Myers, 2011). Finally, Diener investigated the differences of SWB among affluent countries. He compared the SWB scores of Denmark and the United States and discovered the “Danish Effect”: people in Denmark are in general happier than those in the USA despite similar income because the poorest citizens in Denmark are more satisfied with their lives than the poorest ones in the US (Biswas-Diener, Vitterso, & Diener, 2010).

=== Measurement of SWB ===
Together with colleagues, Diener developed three scales that help scientists to assess Well-Being. The Satisfaction with Life Scale (SWLS) measures global cognitive judgments of satisfaction with one's life (Diener, Emmons, Larsen, & Griffin, 1985). The original article has been cited over 7,400 times and the SWLS has become the most widely used scale for evaluating life satisfaction. The Scale of Positive and Negative Experience (SPANE) assesses one's frequency of experiencing a variety of positive and negative emotions. The Flourishing Scale (FS) measures one's self-perceived success in important areas of life, such as relationship, self-esteem, and optimism (Diener et al., 2009).

== Accomplishments ==
In 2012, Diener was awarded the Distinguished Scientist Lifetime Career Award by the American Psychological Association. In 2013, Diener received the William James Lifetime Achievement Award by the Association for Psychological Science. Diener founded a new journal, Perspectives on Psychological Science, which has become one of the most acclaimed and widely read journals in the field. He was one of the founding editors of the Journal of Happiness Studies. Diener has over 257,000 citations in Google Scholar (April 28, 2021). Diener published 340 books and articles. He has several Psychological Bulletin articles, several American Psychologist papers, 12 publications in Psychological Science, and over 57 publications in the Journal of Personality and Social Psychology. He authored three books and edited seven more. Working with the Gallup survey organization, Diener conducted the first poll of the world ever conducted, including 155 nations and representing 99 percent of the population of the globe. More than any other scientist, Diener studied the poorest people in the world, including groups such as the homeless and those living in slums such as in Calcutta. In this research he has discovered how some individuals can achieve positive well-being in dire circumstances, for example through their relationships and spirituality. In recognition of his scientific contributions, Ed Diener held an endowed chair at his university, the Joseph R. Smiley Distinguished Professorship of Psychology. He received the Distinguished Scientist Award from both the American Psychological Association and the International Society of Quality of Life Studies, and the outstanding personality psychologist award (the “Jack Block Award”) from Division 8 of APA, the Society of Personality and Social Psychology. Diener has several honorary doctorates to his name, was a fellow of five scientific societies, and has been the focus of many popular media articles, from Newsweek to the Wall Street Journal to Reader's Digest. In March 2017, the Emir of Dubai, Sheikh Mohammed bin Rashid Al Maktoum named Diener the inaugural chair of the Council of Personal Happiness, a subcommittee of the World Happiness Council.

== National accounts of SWB ==
Diener proposed that nations collect data on the subjective and psychological well-being of citizens to help in policy discussions. In 2004 Diener authored with Martin Seligman an influential article, Beyond Money: Toward an Economy of Well-being, arguing that the well-being indicators would supplement economic, educational, and other national measures to provide policy makers and leaders with important information. The idea is that because subjective well-being is affected by many aspects of quality of life in societies, the subjective well-being measures could be used to examine who and in what regions of nations people were flourishing versus suffering. The finding that subjective well-being is beneficial to outcomes such as health, longevity, social relationships, and work productivity, added force to the proposal. The idea of national accounts of well-being has met with some success. The United Kingdom adopted well-being measures based on a directive from David Cameron, the Prime Minister. The Organization of Economic Cooperation and Development issued guidelines in 2013 for national accounts of subjective well-being, and a number of nations are now collecting such data.

== The Noba Well-Being intervention to raise well-being ==
The Dieners and their colleagues developed a program to raise well-being, a 10-week psychosocial skills course called Noba Well-Being. The program includes several types of skills, for example, positive sociability, values and strengths understanding, sleep and exercise, and coping with stress and difficult events. Randomized controlled trial studies using college students, adult volunteers, and seniors, have shown that Noba Well-Being raises well-being – for example, life satisfaction, self-esteem, feelings of meaning and purposes, and lower chronic feelings of ill-being. It also has been found to decrease sick days, raise physical activity levels, and enhance cognitive functioning. The program can be delivered in several ways: by website, by app, or written in a paper-and-pencil format. The program is easy to deliver, relatively inexpensive, requires only short training for leaders to deliver it, and includes diverse psychosocial skills such as Mindfulness, positive social interactions, and getting adequate restful sleep. Noba Well-Being can be used either by individuals or in groups (e.g., in clubs, dormitories, business units, and so forth).

== Philanthropy ==
In 2013, Diener and his wife Carol (Ph.D. Clinical Psychology) launched the Noba Project. Supported by their Diener Education Fund, the project aimed to reduce financial costs to psychology students by providing freely available online textbook alternatives. The Dieners recruited their friends and colleagues (such as Elizabeth Loftus, Ap Dijksterhuis, and Roy Baumeister) to write chapters on their areas of expertise, and the project compiled these into a set of multimedia textbooks that are freely available and customizable by instructors. Eventually, the project began offering print versions of both curated and customized textbooks.

== Partial bibliography ==
- Happiness: Unlocking the Mysteries of Psychological Wealth, with his son, Robert Biswas-Diener.
- Well-being and Public Policy (2009) with John Helliwell, Richard Lucas, Ulrich Schimmack
- International Differences in Well-Being (2010) with Daniel Kahneman and John Helliwell.

== See also ==
- Positive psychology
