= Social Research and Demonstration Corporation =

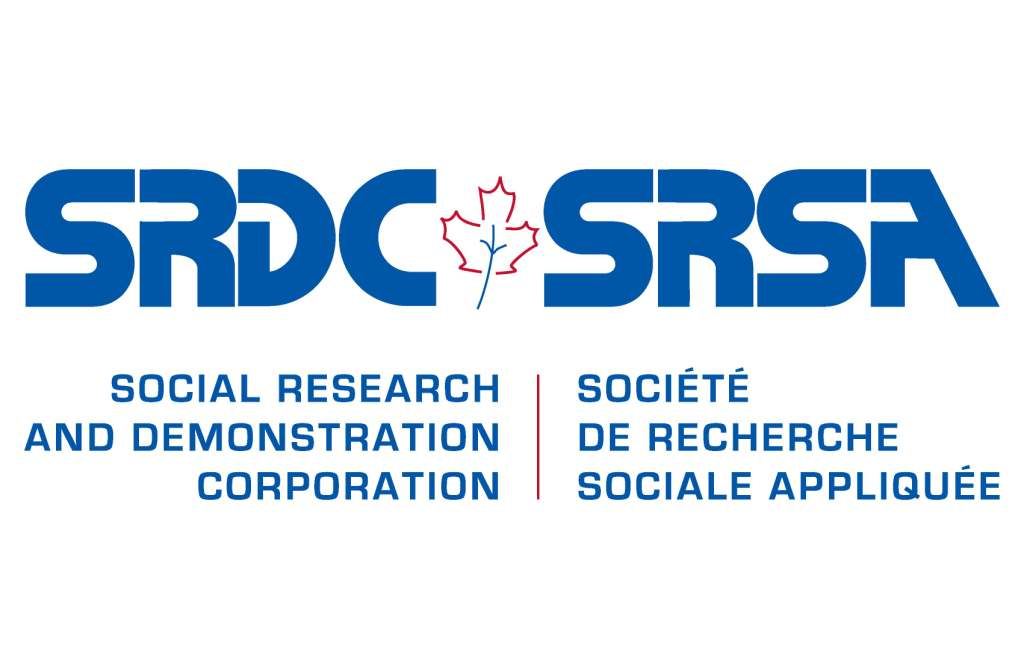
- Abbreviation: SRDC
- Formation: 1991-present
- Type: Social policy research and program evaluation
- Legal status: active
- Purpose: An independent, non-partisan research organization specializing in social policy research and the evaluation of large-scale demonstration projects.
- Headquarters: Ottawa, Ontario, Canada
- Region served: Canada
- Official language: English, French
- President: David Gyarmati
- Affiliations: Offices in Ottawa, Vancouver, Calgary, and Montreal
- Staff: 40
- Website: http://www.srdc.org

The Social Research and Demonstration Corporation (SRDC) is an independent non-profit and non-partisan social policy research organization based in Canada, with a focus on designing, implementing and evaluating large-scale demonstration projects.

The organization helps policy-makers and practitioners develop and identify policies and programs that are effective, with the goal of raising the standards of evidence used in assessing the effectiveness of policies. Their work encompasses a wide variety of social policy domains, including education, literacy training, child development, community building, income security programs and population health. SRDC designs, implements, operates and evaluates these projects with an emphasis on the Canadian public policy context.

== History ==
SRDC was established in 1991 at the request of the Government of Canada Human Resources and Skills Development Canada (HRSDC) agency as an arm's length research organization capable of implementing long-term, multi-site demonstration projects. Since then, SRDC has completed close to 150 projects and studies on behalf of federal, provincial and regional governments, as well as other public and non-profit organizations. They operate across Canada, with offices in Ottawa, Ontario, Toronto, Ontario, and Vancouver, British Columbia.

Their most recent initiative includes being mandated by the Government of British Columbia to implement a new Centre for Employment Research, set to launch in the fall of 2012. The role of the centre, according to the BC government, will be to "support the employment services sector, including employers and service providers, with the goal of improving outcomes for all unemployed job seekers in the province." The centre will encompass a research and development program and a systemic approach for sharing best practices throughout the sector. It will act as a single coordination point for employment research and innovation, as well as training in best practices.

Other large-scale projects conducted by SRDC include Life After High School in Ontario, a provincially government-funded pilot project to provide Grade 12 students at selected Ontario secondary schools with practical support applying for post-secondary education and financial aid. Another example is Upskill: Essential to Excel, a project using random assignment design to measure the impacts of LES training on workers' skills, their job performance, and other outcomes relevant to works and firm-level objectives.

Earlier SRDC research includes The Self-Sufficiency Project, which randomly assigned single-parent, long-term welfare recipients into a program group and a comparison group. Program group members could receive a subsidy in exchange for their leaving welfare in favour of full-time work. The subsidy was available for three years, but only to people who began working full-time within 12 months of random assignment. The resulting paper was the recipient of the Frisch Medal Award, an honor bestowed every two years for an applied article (empirical or theoretical) published in Econometrica during the previous five-year period.

In 2000, SRDC was presented with the Outstanding Research Contribution Award by the Policy Research Secretariat.

== Select publications ==
The SRDC website hosts a wide variety of publications on social policy that were conducted on behalf of federal, provincial and municipal government and non-profit clients. Included below is a small sample:

- Employees' Perspectives on Intermittent Work Capacity: What Can Qualitative Research Tell Us in Ontario?
- Willingness to Pay (WTP) for Post-secondary Education Among Under-represented Groups
- CareerMotion—How Web-based technologies can improve the career choices of young people
- Community Employment Innovation Project (CEIP) -- Encouraging Work and Supporting Communities
- learnSave Project—Learning to Save, Saving to Learn
- Future to Discover(As reviewed in The Globe and Mail)
- Self-sufficiency Project—Making Work Pay
- Financial Literacy of Low-income Students
