= Martin Seligman =

American psychologist and writer (born 1942)

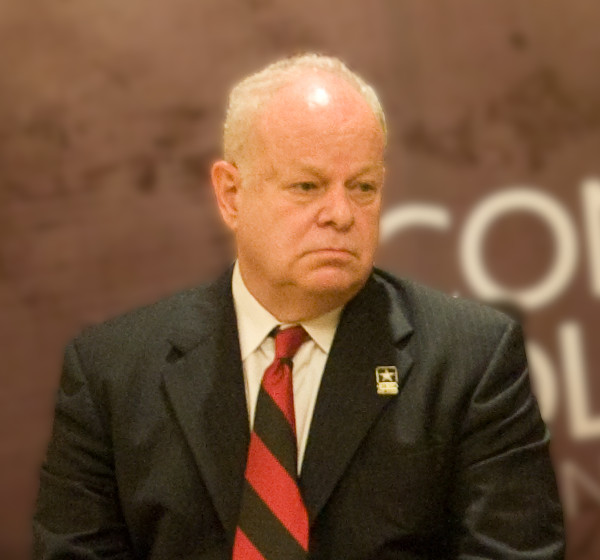
- Seligman in 2009
- Born: Martin Elias Peter Seligman; August 12, 1942 (age 84); Albany, New York, U.S.
- Education: Princeton University (AB); University of Pennsylvania (PhD)
- Known for: Positive psychology; Learned helplessness
- Awards: James McKeen Cattell Fellow Award (1995); Joseph Zubin Award (1997); APA Award for Lifetime Contributions to Psychology (2017)
- Scientific career
- Fields: Psychology
- Workplaces: University of Pennsylvania

Martin Elias Peter Seligman (/ˈsɛlɪɡmən/; born August 12, 1942) is an American psychologist, educator, and author of self-help books. Seligman is a strong promoter within the scientific community of his theories of well-being and positive psychology. His theory of learned helplessness is popular among scientific and clinical psychologists. A Review of General Psychology survey, published in 2002, ranked Seligman as the 31st most cited psychologist of the 20th century.

Seligman is the Zellerbach Family Professor of Psychology in the University of Pennsylvania's Department of Psychology. He was previously the Director of the Clinical Training Program in the department, and earlier taught at Cornell University. He is the director of the university's Positive Psychology Center. Seligman was elected president of the American Psychological Association for 1998. He is the founding editor-in-chief of Prevention and Treatment (the APA electronic journal) and is on the board of advisers of Parents magazine.

Seligman has written about positive psychology topics in books such as The Optimistic Child, Child's Play, Learned Optimism, Authentic Happiness, and Flourish. His most recent book, Tomorrowmind, co-written with Gabriella Rosen Kellerman, was published in 2023.

== Early life and education ==
Seligman was born in Albany, New York, to a Jewish family. He was educated at a public school and at The Albany Academy. He earned a bachelor's degree in philosophy at Princeton University in 1964, graduating summa cum laude. and a Ph.D. in psychology from the University of Pennsylvania in 1967. In June 1989, Seligman received an honorary doctorate from the Faculty of Social Sciences at Uppsala University, Sweden.

== Learned helplessness ==
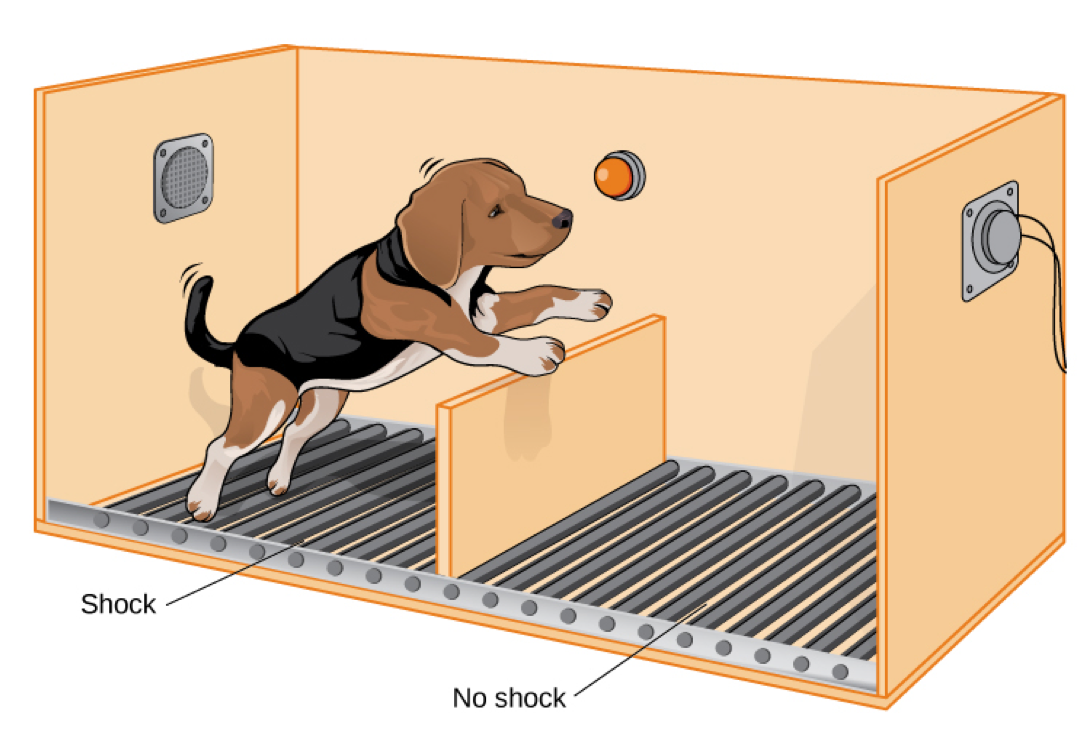
Inescapable shock training in the shuttle box

Seligman's foundational experiments and theory of "learned helplessness" began at University of Pennsylvania in 1967, as an extension of his interest in depression. Seligman and colleagues accidentally discovered that the experimental conditioning protocol they used with dogs led to behaviors which were unexpected, in that under the experimental conditions, the recently conditioned dogs did not respond to opportunities to learn to escape from an unpleasant situation ('electric shocks of moderate intensity'). A fictionalised account of the experiment, and illustration of anti-vivisection arguments about the ethics of shocking dogs in the name of psychological research, occur in clinical psychologist Guy Holmes' novel The Black Dogs of Glaslyn.

At the time, and in subsequent years, very little ethical critique of the experiment was published, although definitional and conceptual issues were critiqued. Ethical critique would later be raised by the academic Alastair Norcross, who argued that the expected human benefits were not large enough for the harm inflicted to the dogs that occurred.

Seligman developed the theory further, finding learned helplessness to be a psychological condition in which a human being or an animal has learned to act or behave helplessly in a particular situation—usually after experiencing some inability to avoid an adverse situation—even when it actually has the power to change its unpleasant or even harmful circumstance. Seligman saw a similarity with severely depressed patients, and argued that clinical depression and related mental illnesses result in part from a perceived absence of control over the outcome of a situation. In later years, alongside Abramson, Seligman reformulated his theory of learned helplessness to include attributional style.

== Happiness ==
In his 2002 book Authentic Happiness, Seligman saw happiness as made up of positive emotion, engagement and meaning.

== Positive psychology ==
Seligman worked with Christopher Peterson to create what they describe as a "positive" counterpart to the Diagnostic and Statistical Manual of Mental Disorders (DSM). While the DSM focuses on what can go wrong, Character Strengths and Virtues (2004) is designed to look at what can go right. In their research they looked across cultures and across millennia to attempt to distill a manageable list of virtues that have been highly valued from ancient China and India, through Greece and Rome, to contemporary Western cultures.

Their list includes six character strengths: wisdom/knowledge, courage, humanity, justice, temperance, and transcendence. Each of these has three to five sub-entries; for instance, temperance includes forgiveness, humility, prudence, and self-regulation. The authors do not believe that there is a hierarchy for the six virtues; no one is more fundamental than or a precursor to the others.

== Well-being ==
In his book Flourish, 2011, Seligman wrote on "Well-Being Theory", and said, with respect to how he measures well-being:

Each element of well-being must itself have three properties to count as an element:

1. It contributes to well-being.
2. Many people pursue it for its own sake, not merely to get any of the other elements.
3. It is defined and measured independently of the other elements.

Seligman concluded that there are five elements to "well-being", which fall under the mnemonic PERMA:

- Positive emotion—Can only be assessed subjectively
- Engagement—Like positive emotion, can only be measured through subjective means. It is presence of a flow state
- Relationships—The presence of friends, family, intimacy, or social connection
- Meaning—Belonging to and serving something bigger than one's self
- Achievement—Accomplishment that is pursued even when it brings no positive emotion, no meaning, and nothing in the way of positive relationships.

There have been some attempts to empirically validate a PERMA model of well-being, with evidence suggesting a high correlation with other measures of subjective well-being. However, it is not considered the scientific consensus definition or model.

In July 2011, Seligman encouraged the British Prime Minister, David Cameron, to look into well-being as well as financial wealth as ways of assessing the prosperity of a nation.

=== MAPP program ===
The Master of Applied Positive Psychology (MAPP) program at the University of Pennsylvania was established under the leadership of Seligman as the first educational initiative of the Positive Psychology Center in 2003.

== Personal life ==
Seligman plays bridge and finished second in the 1998 installment of one of the three major North American pair championships, the Blue Ribbon Pairs, as well as having won over 50 regional championships.

Seligman has seven children, four grandchildren, and two dogs. He and his second wife, Mandy, live in a house that was once occupied by Eugene Ormandy. They have home-schooled five of their seven children.

Seligman was inspired by the work of the psychiatrist Aaron T. Beck at the University of Pennsylvania in refining his own cognitive techniques and exercises.

== Publications ==
- — (1975). Helplessness: On Depression, Development, and Death. San Francisco: W.H. Freeman. ISBN 978-0-7167-0752-3. (Paperback reprint edition, W.H. Freeman, 1992, ISBN 0-7167-2328-X)
- — (1991). Learned Optimism: How to Change Your Mind and Your Life. New York: Knopf. ISBN 978-0-671-01911-2. (Paperback reprint edition, Penguin Books, 1998; reissue edition, Free Press, 1998)
- — (1993). What You Can Change and What You Can't: The Complete Guide to Successful Self-Improvement. New York: Knopf. ISBN 978-0-679-41024-9. (Paperback reprint edition, Ballantine Books, 1995, ISBN 0-449-90971-9)
- — (1996). The Optimistic Child: Proven Program to Safeguard Children from Depression & Build Lifelong Resilience. New York: Houghton Mifflin. ISBN 978-0-09-183119-6. (Paperback edition, Harper Paperbacks, 1996, ISBN 0-06-097709-4)
- — (2002). Authentic Happiness: Using the New Positive Psychology to Realize Your Potential for Lasting Fulfillment. New York: Free Press. ISBN 978-0-7432-2297-6. (Paperback edition, Free Press, 2004, ISBN 0-7432-2298-9)
- — (Spring 2004). "Can Happiness be Taught?". Daedalus. 133 (2): 80–87. doi:10.1162/001152604323049424. S2CID 57570511.
- Peterson, Christopher; Seligman, Martin E. P. (2004). Character Strengths and Virtues. Oxford: Oxford University Press. ISBN 978-0-19-516701-6.
- — (2011). Flourish: A Visionary New Understanding of Happiness and Well-being. New York: Free Press. ISBN 978-1-4391-9075-3.
- — (2018). The Hope Circuit: A Psychologist's Journey from Helplessness to Optimism. PublicAffairs. ISBN 978-1-61-039873-2.
- Rosen Kellerman, Gabriella; Seligman, Martin E. P. (2023). Tomorrowmind. New York: Simon Element/Simon Acumen. ISBN 978-1-98-215976-4.
- — (2026). Agency: The Psychological History of Human Progress. New York: Simon & Schuster. ISBN 978-1-98-219064-4.
