= Ohood Al Roumi =

Emirati politician

Minister of State for Government Development and Future
- Incumbent
- Assumed office July 2020
- Preceded by: Position established

Minister of State for Happiness and Wellbeing
- Incumbent
- Assumed office February 2016
- Preceded by: Position established

Personal details
- Education: Executive Master’s Degree in Business Administration (EMBA) University of Sharjah

Ohood bint Khalfan Al Roumi is an Emirati politician who is the Minister of State for Government Development and Future. She is also Chairwoman of the Federal Authority for Government Human Resources (FAHR).

== Education ==
Al Roumi holds an Executive Master’s Degree in Business Administration (EMBA) from the University of Sharjah and a Bachelor’s in Economics from the College of Business and Economics, United Arab Emirates University. She is also a graduate from Mohammed Bin Rashid Program for Leadership Development.

== Career ==
Al Roumi is the Minister of State for Government Development and Future in the United Arab Emirates. This ministerial portfolio was created in the new UAE government formation that took place in July 2020, with the aim of advancing government development and preparation and planning for the future of the UAE government.

Her Excellency Al Roumi is also Chairwoman of the Federal Authority for Government Human Resources (FAHR), the federal entity responsible for the growth and development of the UAE federal government human resources. Her Excellency is the Vice President of the World Government Summit Organization and Vice President of the International Institute for Tolerance. She is also on the Board of Directors of the Federal Competitiveness and Statistics Authority and a member of the board of trustees of the Museum of the Future.

She also serves as the Director-General of the Prime Minister’s Office of UAE and is currently overseeing multiple strategic programs and initiatives such as UAE Centennial 2071, UAE Vision 2021, The National Agenda, the UAE Government Strategy, The National Strategy for Innovation, The Federal Government Accelerators, Mohammed Bin Rashid Centre For Government Innovation, Government Performance Management System “Adaa”, Sheikh Khalifa Government Excellence Program, Mohammed Bin Rashid Government Excellence Award, UAE Government Leaders Programme, Emirates Government Service Excellence Program, Global Star Rating System for Services, World GovTechioneers, Best M-Government Service and Mohammed Bin Rashid Policies Council.

Al Roumi also leads the virtual management team for proactive government services within the "Ministry of Possibilities", overseeing the implementation of numerous national and global initiatives led by the Prime Minister’s Office in the Ministry of Cabinet Affairs, such as "The UAE Government Annual Meetings” and " The Annual Meetings of the Global Future Councils" in collaboration with the World Economic Forum.

Prior to her role at the Ministry of Cabinet Affairs, Al Roumi held several leadership positions within the UAE federal government and the Government of Dubai. She was the Director of Economic Policy at the Executive Office of His Highness Sheikh Mohammed bin Rashid Al Maktoum, Vice President Prime Minister of UAE Ruler of Dubai. She also was Director of Business Research at the Dubai Chamber of Commerce and Industry, where she led several teams to develop multiple government-driven strategies, such as the Economic Sector Task Force for the Dubai Government's as well as the Federal Government strategy.

In 2016, Al Roumi held the position of Minister of State for Happiness and Wellbeing, the first ministerial position of its kind in the world introduced by the UAE government to achieve happiness and wellbeing in the UAE society.

== Recognition ==
In 2015, The United Nations Foundation appointed Al Roumi as a member of the UN’s Global Entrepreneurship Council (GEC), making her the first Arab member to hold that position. She also made the Young Global Leaders (YGL) list with World Economic Forum (WEF) in 2012. Also, she was listed among the World’s Greatest Leaders in 2017 by Fortune magazine in recognition of her accomplishments, making her the only Arab figure on the list.
