= Richard Layard, Baron Layard =

British economist (born 1934)

The Right Honourable The Lord Layard FBA FAcSS
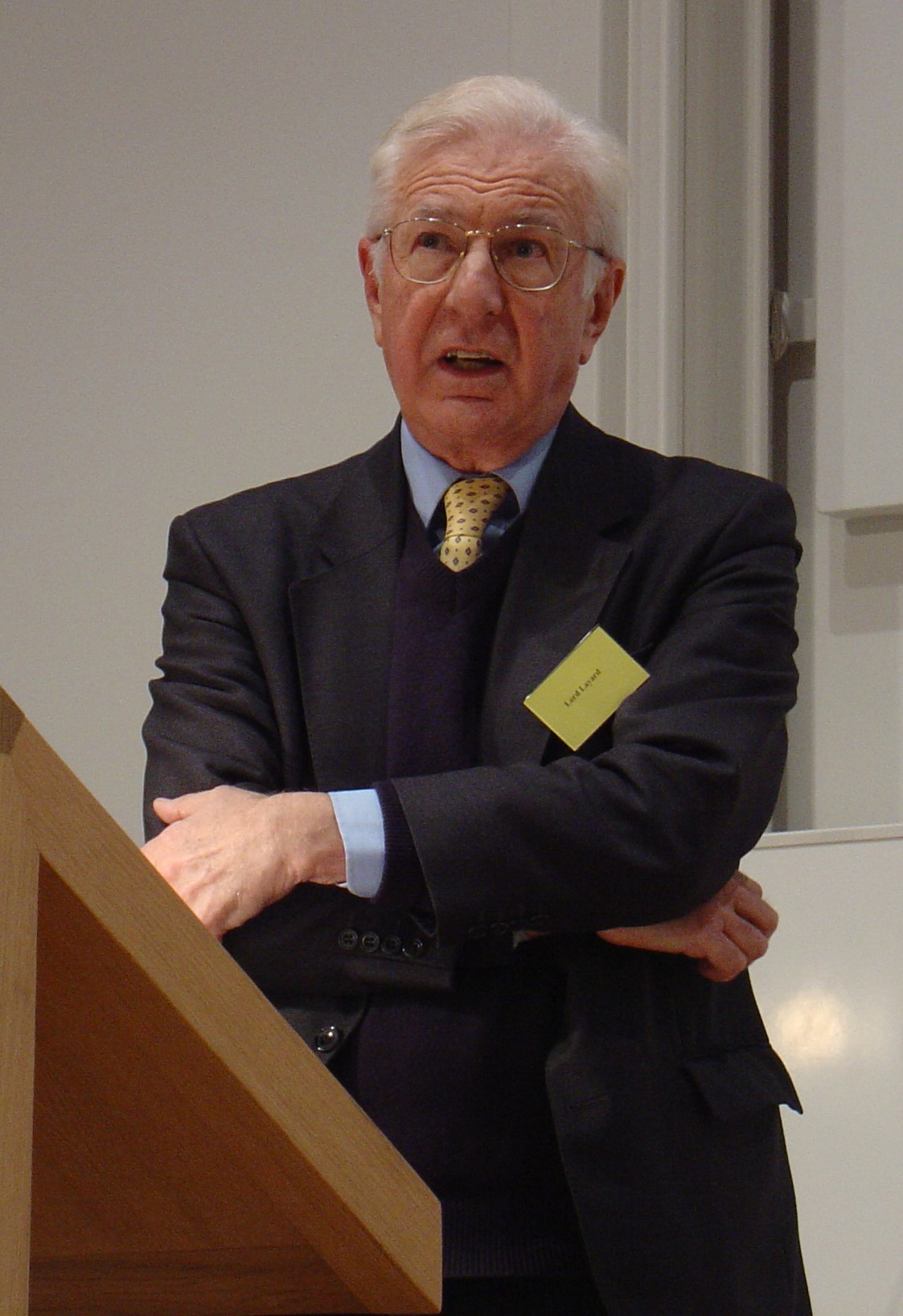
- Lord Layard in 2006

Member of the House of Lords
- Lord Temporal
- Life peerage 3 May 2000

Personal details
- Born: Peter Richard Grenville Layard; 15 March 1934 (age 92)
- Party: Labour
- Spouse: Molly, Baroness Meacher
- Education: Eton College
- Alma mater: King's College, Cambridge; London School of Economics

Peter Richard Grenville Layard, Baron Layard FBA (born 15 March 1934) is a British labour economist, co-director of the Community Wellbeing programme at the Centre for Economic Performance at the London School of Economics, and co-editor of the World Happiness Report. Layard is an economist who wants public policy to be targeted at the wellbeing of the people. To this end he has written 6 books and some 40 articles.

His work on mental health, including publishing The Depression Report in 2006, led to the establishment of the Improving Access to Psychological Therapies (IAPT) programme in England.

== Family and education ==
Peter Richard Grenville Layard is the son of John Layard and his wife Doris. He was educated at Eton College, where he was a King's scholar; at King's College, Cambridge; and at the London School of Economics.

== Work ==
Layard was Senior Research Officer for the Robbins Committee on Higher Education, and later developed a reputation in the economics of education (with Mark Blaug at LSE), and in labour economics (in particular with Stephen Nickell).

=== Labour economics ===
In the 1980s he and his colleagues developed the Layard-Nickell model of how the level of unemployment is determined. This has become the most commonly used model by European economists and governments. It assigns an important role to how unemployed people are treated, and provides the intellectual basis for the welfare-to-work policies introduced in many countries, including Britain, Germany and Denmark.

The basic message is in Unemployment: Macroeconomic Performance and the Labour Market. This was first published in 1991, and a second edition in 2005 showed how well the model predicted the development of unemployment in different countries over the years between 1991 and 2003.

Drawing on this work, Layard was active in the policy field on unemployment, both in the UK and outside. In 1985 he founded the Employment Institute to press for welfare to work policies, and his proposals were largely implemented in 2007 in the Labour Party's New Deal policies for young people, and then older adults. His influence also spread to Europe. In the 1980s he was Chairman of the European Commission's Macroeconomic Policy Group and in the 1990s the Hartz reforms in Germany were influenced by his work. From 1997 to 2001 he was a part-time consultant to the British government on welfare-to-work and vocational education.

On inequality, his work shows the key role of education in influencing the income of individuals and families. He has been a strong advocate of better vocational education (including apprenticeship) for less academic youngsters. The case he made led to major increases in apprenticeship and the 2009 Apprenticeship Act which guaranteed access to an apprenticeship for qualified applicants, later repealed.

He advocated many of the policies which characterised the New Labour government, particularly the New Deal, partly by founding the Centre for Economic Performance at the London School of Economics. He supported the idea of welfare-to-work, where social welfare payments are structured in a way that encourages (or forces) recipients back into the job market.

As well as academic positions, Layard worked as an advisor for numerous organisations, including government institutions in the United Kingdom and Russia.

In 1990 he was founder-director of the Centre for Economic Performance at the London School of Economics where he is presently a programme director. The Centre has become one of Europe's leading research institutes

=== Happiness and wellbeing ===
Layard became active in the study of what has since come to be known as happiness economics. This branch of economic analysis starts from the argument that income is a bad approximation for happiness. He has always believed, as in the 18th Century Enlightenment, that societies should be judged by the happiness of the people. And since the 1970s he has urged fellow economists to return to the idea that public policy should maximise a social welfare function depending on the distribution of happiness. In 1980 he wrote (according to Richard Easterlin) "the first paper to focus specifically on the policy implications of empirical research on happiness". In 2005 he wrote Happiness: Lessons from a New Science, which was published in 20 languages.

In his early research on wellbeing, he focused heavily on the role of relative income as a determinant of wellbeing. He showed how in many countries the income of one’s reference group reduces one’s own happiness – and he showed the implications of this for tax policy and the measurement of the “excess burden” of taxes. He also studied (with co-authors) the form of the income-happiness relationship. This pioneering and much-quoted study found that happiness was approximately linear in log income.

He then turned to the whole range of influences on wellbeing as it develops over the life cycle, using longitudinal data from 4 countries. This co-authored work was published in 2014 and more fully in a book called The Origins of Happiness: The science of wellbeing over the life course (2018). It revealed, among other things, the huge impact of schools and teachers upon subsequent wellbeing, and the huge role that the independent variation of mental health plays in explaining the variance of wellbeing.

==== Mental health ====
Given this, he argued strongly for more attention to mental health, both as a key factor affecting wellbeing, but also as an important factor of production affecting productivity and employment. He argued that the economics is quite different for mental and physical health. Mental illness is mainly a disease of working age, with huge economic costs, while physical illness is mainly a disease of retirement. Thus, inexpensive treatments for mental illness will pay for themselves in reduced welfare and increased taxes.

Working together with the distinguished psychologist David M. Clark in 2007 resulted in the development of Improving Access to Psychological Therapies (IAPT), an initiative to improve access to psychological therapies in the United Kingdom. It established a new psychological therapy service for anxiety disorders and depression (renamed in 2023 to NHS Talking Therapies). This was established in 2008 and now treats over 700,000 people a year, of whom half recover within an average of 8 sessions of treatment. The programme has paid for itself and has been copied in 5 other countries. In a series of co-authored articles he showed how psychological therapy affected employment and thus paid for itself in savings on welfare benefits and lost taxes. This work also showed what factors affected the recovery rates in different local services. This led to significant improvements in recovery rates. He summarised his analysis on mental health in a book (co-authored with Clark) called Thrive (2014).

He also helped develop a major programme for mental health prevention in schools. This was a weekly 4-year curriculum in life skills for pupils aged 11–15 called Healthy Minds. It was highly manualised and when evaluated in a randomised trial in 32 schools, was found to be highly cost-effective.

==== Wellbeing science ====
Meantime in 2012 he became a founder co-editor of the annual World Happiness Report in which he has written numerous articles. In one of these (2021) he published the first estimates of the Wellbeing-Years (WELLBYs) a person could expect to experience if born in different areas of the world. His central aim has always been to develop wellbeing science to the point where it can provide key evidence for the selection of all policy priorities. In 2014 he laid out the framework for this approach in one chapter of the report Wellbeing and Policy, chaired by Gus O’Donnell. But the crucial need was to bring together the evidence on all the factors which affect wellbeing. In 2023 he did this in the first comprehensive textbook on wellbeing (with Jan Emmanuel De Neve) – Wellbeing: Science and Policy. This aims to persuade policy-makers that wellbeing is a feasible goal for them, and also to develop the cadre of trained analysts to help them target it. As the book makes clear, the aim is not to supplant traditional cost-benefit analysis (based on revealed preference), but to supplement it in the myriad of cases where revealed preference can provide no plausible evidence, but direct measures of wellbeing can. Layard’s current research is focused on showing how this approach can illuminate public priorities through worked examples of benefit/cost ratios across the whole field of policy.

Wellbeing policy

Layard’s policy work has reached far beyond mental health. He has been a major leader in the effort to put wellbeing at the centre of the movement to go “Beyond GDP”. In 2010 he persuaded the British Prime Minister David Cameron that wellbeing would be a major government objective, and be regularly measured in the national statistics. The measures were then recommended by the OECD to all member countries. More recently his team have been influential in getting evidence on subjective wellbeing officially accepted in the UK Treasury's manual on subjective evaluations. Internationally, he chaired the World Economic Forum Global Agenda Council on Health and Wellbeing, which in 2012 launched a report at Davos “WellBeing and Global Success”.

Since then the World Happiness Report has provided a stream of evidence for policy-makers on the ways in which they can improve the wellbeing of their people. Layard summarised more of the evidence on what can be done in each sphere of life in Can We Be Happier? (2020). Layard has co-founded two movements to promote the wellbeing of society. One, called Action for Happiness (founded in 2012), is a popular movement for personal change to produce a happier world. It now has 600,000 members and 6,000 trained volunteers providing courses and leading groups. The other is the World Wellbeing Movement (founded in 2022), a top-down movement targeted at decision-makers.

In 2024 Layard co-authored a report, Value for Money: How to improve wellbeing and reduce misery. It argues that public money should be spent on those policies which produce the most wellbeing, and therefore the best policies are those which produce the most wellbeing for each pound they cost the government. It is hoped that this approach will be adopted for the 2025 Spending Review.

Subsequent books have included The Good Childhood (2009), Thrive (2014), Can We Be Happier?: Evidence and Ethics (2020), and Wellbeing: Science and Policy (2020).

=== Other roles ===
==== Russia ====
From 1991-1997 he was a part-time economic adviser to the Russian Government, and co-authored The Coming Russian Boom (1996), which correctly forecast the rapid growth in Russia over the following years.

==== House of Lords ====
In 2000 he was made a member of the House of Lords. He has served on various Committees including the Gambling Industry Committee, Youth Unemployment Committee and for much of his peerage, since 2004, has been a member of its Economic Affairs Committee.

==== Climate change ====
In 2015, he was co-author of the report that launched the Global Apollo Programme, which calls for developed nations to commit to spending 0.02% of their GDP for 10 years, to fund co-ordinated research to make carbon-free baseload electricity less costly than electricity from coal by the year 2025.

=== Critique ===
Recent research on happiness questioning part of Baron Layard's thesis and suggesting that people do obtain happiness from increased income forms part of ongoing investigations into the Easterlin Paradox.

== Personal life ==
In 1991, he married Molly Christine Meacher, who was formerly married to Michael Meacher. Molly, styled Lady Layard between 2000 and 2006, was herself created a life peer in 2006 as Baroness Meacher. They are one of the few couples to both hold titles in their own right.

Layard has said he was strongly Christian at school, lost his faith at university, and in his later years 'has to be believe there is some purpose in the universe... which gives me comfort.'

== Honours ==
In 2000 he was made a Labour peer of the House of Lords. In 2003, Layard was elected a Fellow of the British Academy (FBA). In 2016, he was elected a Fellow of the Academy of Social Sciences (FAcSS). In 2020, the Economic and Social Research Council recognised Richard Layard with a rare Lifetime Achievement Award to celebrate the outstanding contribution he has made to social science and society in the UK and beyond.

== Selected bibliography ==
Books

- Layard, P.R.G.; Walters, A.A. (1978). Microeconomic Theory. McGraw Hill. ISBN 9780070367869.
- Layard, Richard; Nickell, Stephen; Jackman, Richard (1991). Unemployment: Macroeconomic Performance and the Labour Market. UK: Oxford University Press. ISBN 9780198284338.
- Layard, Richard (1999). Tackling inequality. New York: St. Martin's Press. ISBN 9780312215767.
- Layard, Richard (2005). Happiness: Lessons from a New Science. London: Penguin. ISBN 9781594200397.
- Layard, Richard; Clark, David (2014). Thrive: The Power of Evidence-Based Psychological Therapies. London: Allen Lane. ISBN 9781846146053.
- Clark, Andrew E.; Fleche, Sarah; Layard, Richard; Nattavudh, Powdthavee; Ward, George (2018). The Origins of Happiness: The Science of Well-Being over the Life Course. Cambridge MA: Princeton University Press. ISBN 9781846146053.
- Layard, Richard; Ward, George (2020). Can We Be Happier?: Evidence and Ethics. London: Pelican. ISBN 9780241429990.
- Layard, Richard; De Neve, Jan Emmanuel (2023). Wellbeing: Science and Policy. UK: Cambridge University Press. ISBN 9781009298940.

== Arms ==
Coat of arms of Richard Layard, Baron Layard

Coronet
Coronet of a Baron
Crest
Out of a Ducal Coronet Or, a Mullet of six-points radiated Or, pierced Gules.
Escutcheon
Quarterly: 1st & 4th, Gules, a Chevron between in chief two Mullets of six-points radiated Or, pierced Gules, and in base a Crescent Argent, on a Chief Azure, three Mullets of six-points Or, pierced Gules (Layard); 2nd, Gules, a Cross Or, in the dexter canton a Lion rampant supporting an Anchor erect with Cable Or (Croze, anciently Croissy); 3rd, Vert, three Doves volant Argent (Balaire).

== See also ==
- Happiness economics

Orders of precedence in the United Kingdom
| Preceded by The Lord Brennan | Gentlemen; Baron Layard | Followed by The Lord Turnberg |
