= Corporatocracy =

Society controlled by business corporations

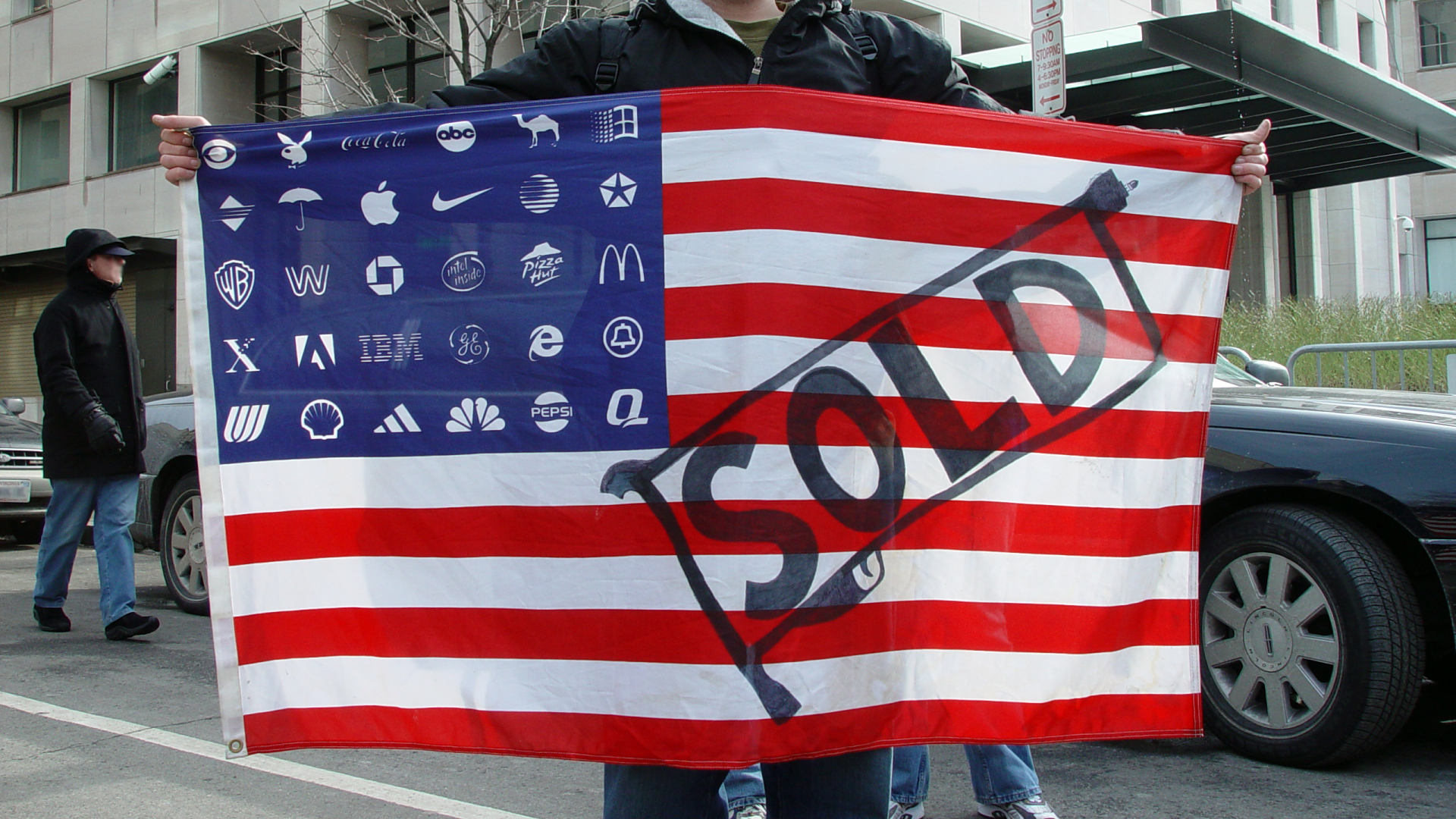
Protester holding Adbusters' Corporate American flag at the Second inauguration of George W. Bush in Washington, D.C.

Corporatocracy (Note: /ˌkɔːrpərəˈtɒkrəsi/; from corporate and Greek: -κρατία, romanized: -kratía, lit. 'domination by') or corpocracy is an economic, political and judicial system controlled or influenced by business corporations or corporate interests.

The concept has been used in explanations of bank bailouts, excessive pay for CEOs, and the exploitation of national treasuries, people, and natural resources. It has been used by critics of globalization, sometimes in conjunction with criticism of the World Bank or unfair lending practices, as well as criticism of free trade agreements. Corporate rule is also a common theme in dystopian science-fiction media.

== Forms of corporatocracy ==
Corporatocracy can manifest in different forms, varying according to the degree of involvement of corporations in the political and social sphere, for example:

- Crony capitalism, in which corporations obtain favors and privileges from the state in exchange for funding or political support;
- Connivance capitalism, in which corporations collude with each other to form oligopolies or cartels, limiting competition and influencing market rules;
- Authoritarian capitalism, in which corporations ally themselves with repressive or anti-democratic political regimes, benefiting from protection and impunity;
- Inverted totalitarianism, theorized by professor Sheldon Wolin, a system where economic powers like corporations exert subtle but substantial power over a system that superficially seems democratic.

== Use of corporatocracy and similar ideas ==
Historian Howard Zinn argues that during the Gilded Age in the United States, the U.S. government acted exactly as Karl Marx described capitalist states: "pretending neutrality to maintain order, but serving the interests of the rich".

James Burnham's 1941 work The Managerial Revolution discussed the increasing influence of "managers" at the expense of more traditional rulers.

According to economist Joseph Stiglitz, there has been a severe increase in the market power of corporations, largely due to U.S. antitrust laws being weakened by neoliberal reforms, leading to growing income-inequality and a generally underperforming economy. He states that to improve the economy, it is necessary to decrease the influence of money on U.S. politics.

In his 1956 book The Power Elite, sociologist C. Wright Mills stated that together with the military and political establishment, leaders of the biggest corporations form a "power elite", which is in control of the U.S.

Economist Jeffrey Sachs described the United States as a corporatocracy in The Price of Civilization (2011). He suggested that it arose from four trends: weak national parties and strong political representation of individual districts, the large U.S. military establishment after World War II, large corporations using money to finance election campaigns, and globalization tilting the balance of power away from workers.

In 2013, economist Edmund Phelps criticized the economic system of the U.S. and other western countries in recent decades as being what he calls "the new corporatism", which he characterizes as a system in which the state is far too involved in the economy and is tasked with "protecting everyone against everyone else", but at the same time, big companies have a great deal of influence on the government, with lobbyists' suggestions being "welcome, especially if they come with bribes".

== Corporate influence on politics in the United States ==
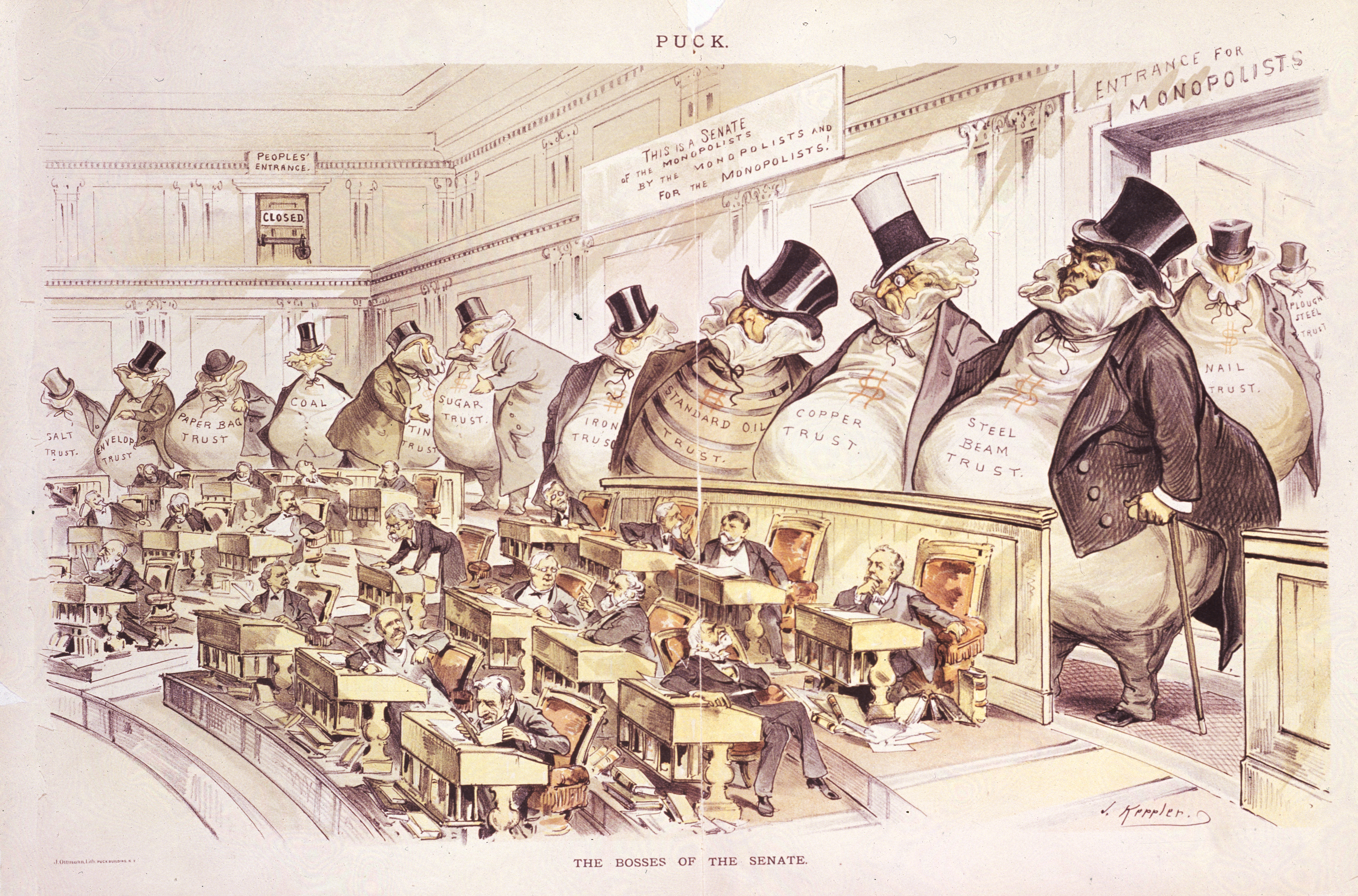
The Bosses of the Senate, corporate interests as giant money bags looming over senators

=== Corruption ===
During the Gilded Age in the United States, corruption was rampant, as business leaders spent significant amounts of money ensuring that government did not regulate their activities.

=== Corporate influence on legislation ===
Corporations have a significant influence on the regulations and regulators that monitor them. For example, Senator Elizabeth Warren stated in December 2014 that an omnibus spending bill required to fund the government was modified late in the process to weaken banking regulations. The modification made it easier to allow taxpayer-funded bailouts of banking "swaps entities", which the Dodd-Frank banking regulations prohibited. She singled out Citigroup, one of the largest banks, which had a role in modifying the legislation. She also stated that both Wall Street bankers and members of the government that formerly had worked on Wall Street stopped bi-partisan legislation that would have broken up the largest banks. She repeated President Theodore Roosevelt's warnings regarding powerful corporate entities that threatened the "very foundations of Democracy".

In a 2015 interview, former President Jimmy Carter stated that the United States is now "an oligarchy with unlimited political bribery" due to the Citizens United v. FEC ruling, which effectively removed limits on donations to political candidates. Wall Street spent a record $2 billion trying to influence the 2016 United States elections.

Joel Bakan, a University of British Columbia law professor and the author of the award-winning book The Corporation: The Pathological Pursuit of Profit and Power, writes:

The Law forbids any motivation for their actions, whether to assist workers, improve the environment, or help consumers save money. They can do these things with their own money, as private citizens. As corporate officials, however, stewards of other people’s money, they have no legal authority to pursue such goals as ends in themselves – only as means to serve the corporation's own interests, which generally means to maximise the wealth of its shareholders. Corporate social responsibility is thus illegal – at least when it is genuine.

— Joel Bakan, The Corporation: The Pathological Pursuit of Profit and Power

== Perceived symptoms of corporatocracy in the United States ==
=== Share of income ===
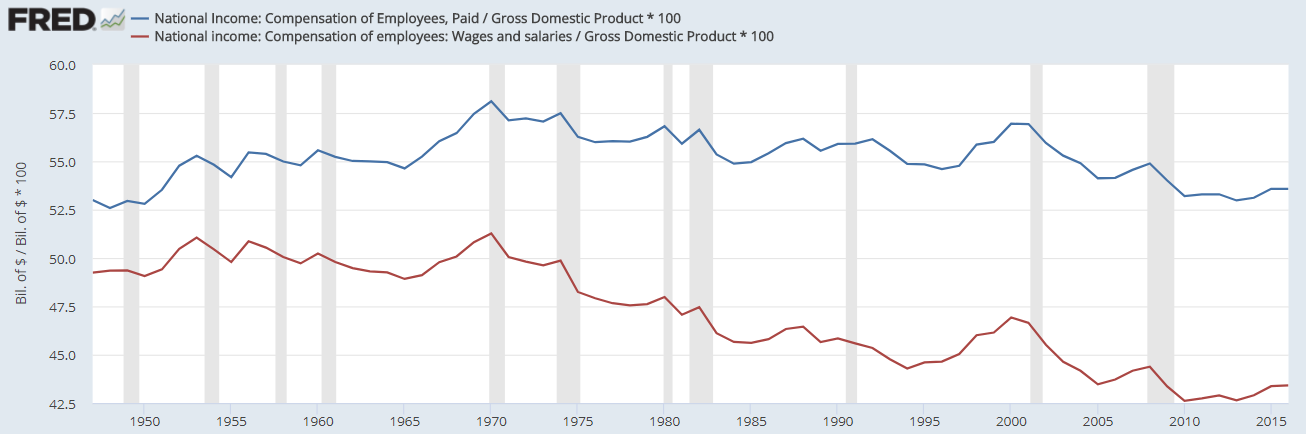
From 1970 to 2013, labor's share of GDP has declined, measured based on total compensation as well as salaries and wages. This implies capital's share is increasing.

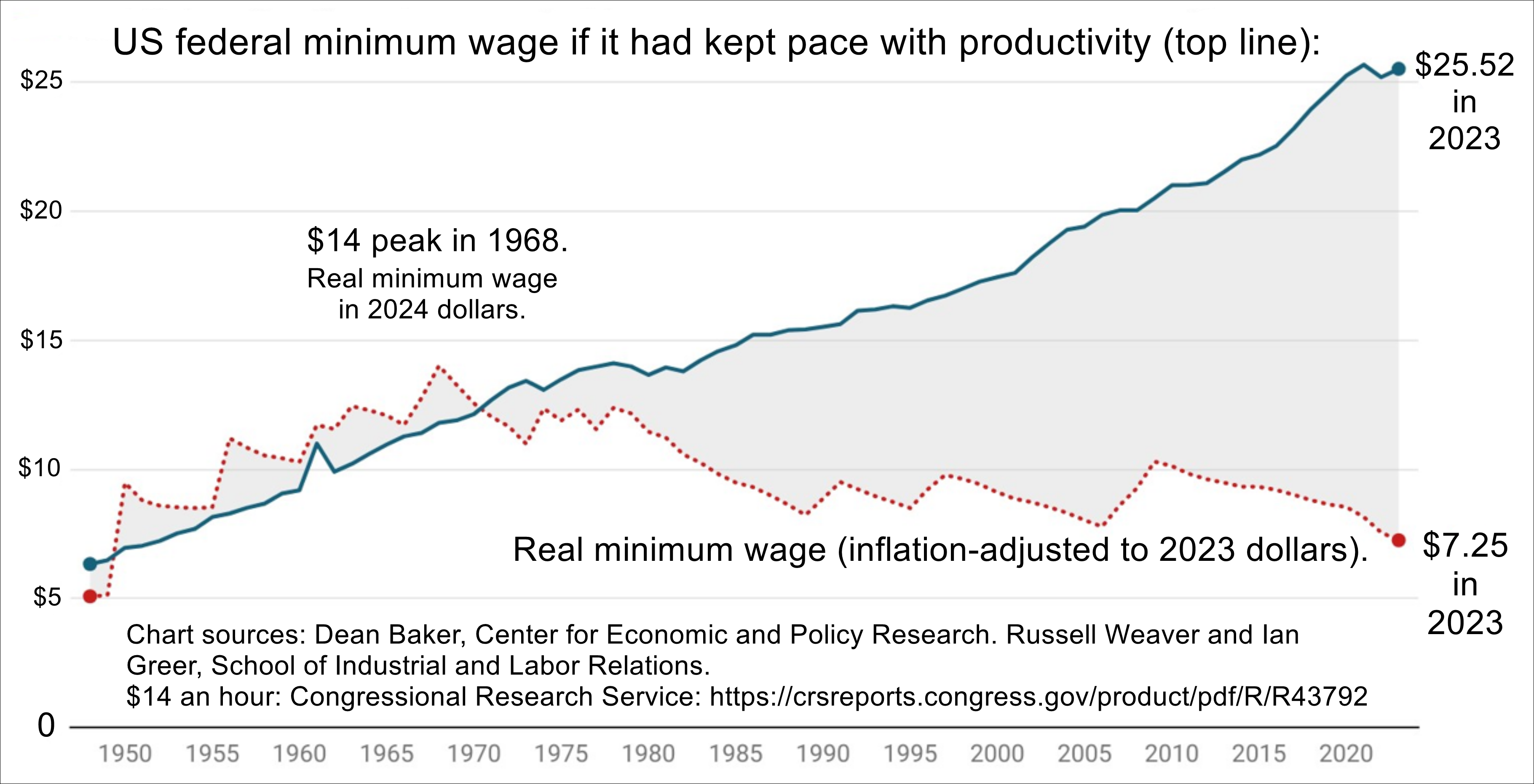
US federal minimum wage if it had kept pace with productivity. Also, the real minimum wage.

With regard to income inequality, the 2014 income analysis of the University of California, Berkeley economist Emmanuel Saez confirms that relative growth of income and wealth is not occurring among small and mid-sized entrepreneurs and business owners (who generally populate the lower half of top one per-centers in income), but instead only among the top .1 percent of the income distribution, who earn $2,000,000 or more every year.

Corporate power can also increase income inequality. Nobel Prize winner of economics Joseph Stiglitz wrote in May 2011: "Much of today's inequality is due to manipulation of the financial system, enabled by changes in the rules that have been bought and paid for by the financial industry itself—one of its best investments ever. The government lent money to financial institutions at close to zero percent interest and provided generous bailouts on favorable terms when all else failed. Regulators turned a blind eye to a lack of transparency and to conflicts of interest." Stiglitz stated that the top 1% got nearly "one-quarter" of the income and own approximately 40% of the wealth.

Measured relative to GDP, total compensation and its component wages and salaries have been declining since 1970. This indicates a shift in income from labor (persons who derive income from hourly wages and salaries) to capital (persons who derive income via ownership of businesses, land, and assets).

Larry Summers estimated in 2007 that the lower 80% of families were receiving $664 billion less income than they would be with a 1979 income distribution, or approximately $7,000 per family. Not receiving this income may have led many families to increase their debt burden, a significant factor in the 2007–2009 subprime mortgage crisis, as highly leveraged homeowners suffered a much larger reduction in their net worth during the crisis. Further, since lower income families tend to spend relatively more of their income than higher income families, shifting more of the income to wealthier families may slow economic growth.

=== Effective corporate tax rates ===
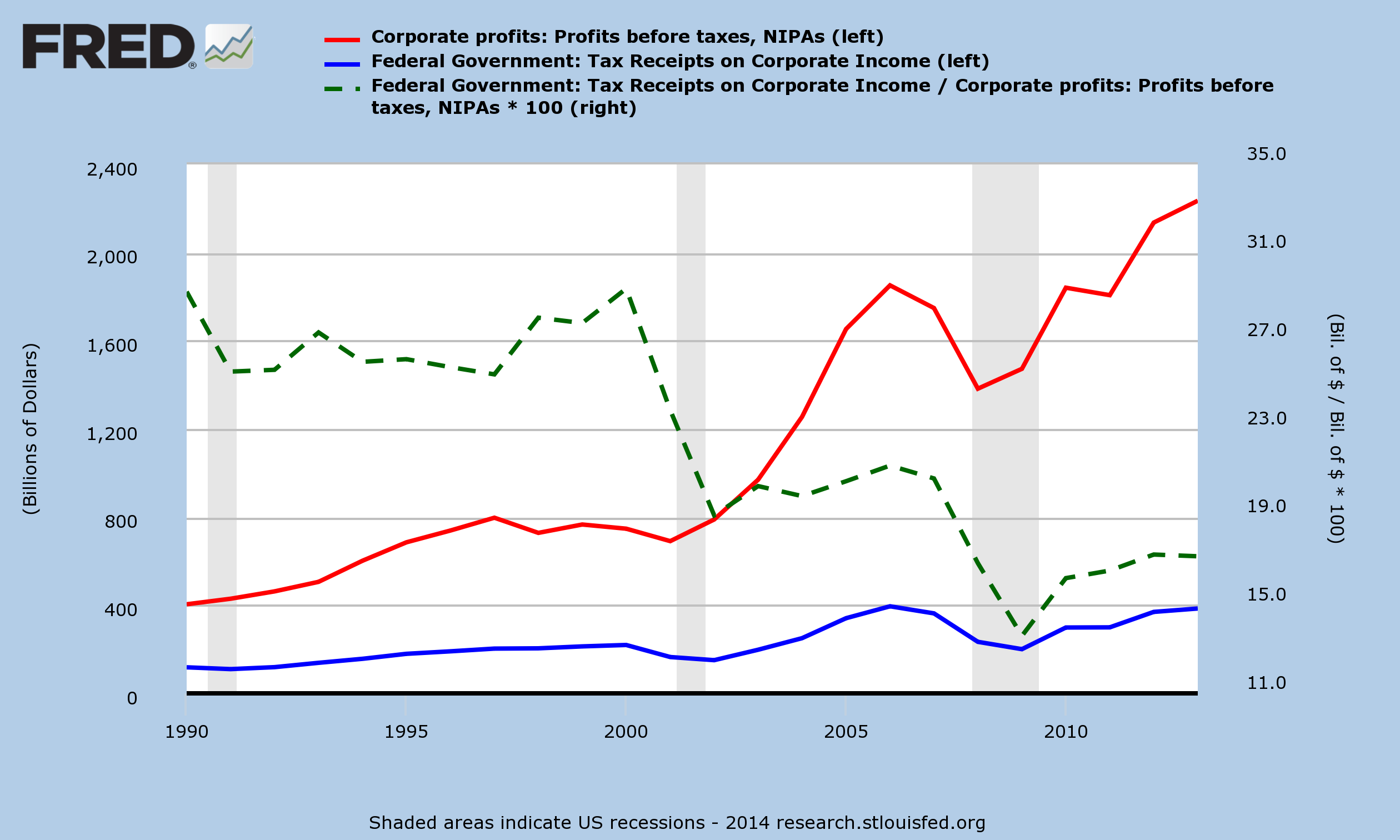
U.S. corporate effective tax rates have fallen significantly since the year 2000.

Some large U.S. corporations have used a strategy called tax inversion to change their headquarters to a non-U.S. country to reduce their tax liability. About 46 companies have reincorporated in low-tax countries since 1982, including 15 since 2012. Six more also planned to do so in 2015.

=== Stock buybacks versus wage increases ===
One indication of increasing corporate power was the removal of restrictions on their ability to buy back stock, contributing to increased income inequality. Writing in the Harvard Business Review in September 2014, William Lazonick blamed record corporate stock buybacks for reduced investment in the economy and a corresponding impact on prosperity and income inequality. Between 2003 and 2012, the 449 companies in the S&P 500 used 54% of their earnings ($2.4 trillion) to buy back their own stock. An additional 37% was paid to stockholders as dividends. Together, these were 91% of profits. This left little for investment in productive capabilities or higher income for employees, shifting more income to capital rather than labor. He blamed executive compensation arrangements, which are heavily based on stock options, stock awards, and bonuses, for meeting earnings per share (EPS) targets. EPS increases as the number of outstanding shares decreases. Legal restrictions on buybacks were greatly eased in the early 1980s. He advocates changing these incentives to limit buybacks.

In the 12 months to March 31, 2014, S&P 500 companies increased their stock buyback payouts by 29% year on year, to $534.9 billion. U.S. companies are projected to increase buybacks to $701 billion in 2015, according to Goldman Sachs, an 18% increase over 2014. For scale, annual non-residential fixed investment (a proxy for business investment and a major GDP component) was estimated to be about $2.1 trillion for 2014.

=== Industry concentration ===
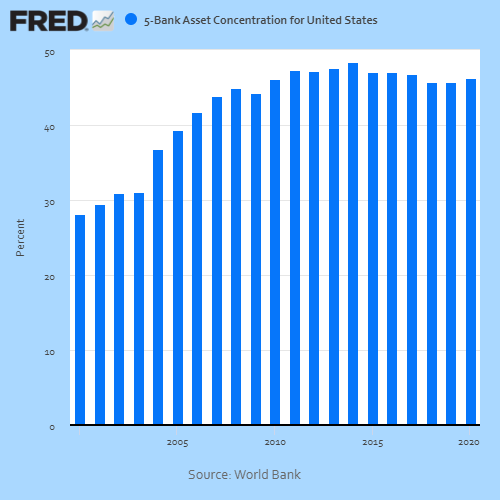
5-bank asset concentration for United States

Brid Brennan of the Transnational Institute stated that the concentration of corporations increases their influence over government: "It's not just their size, their enormous wealth and assets that make the TNCs [transnational corporations] dangerous to democracy. It's also their concentration, their capacity to influence, and often infiltrate, governments and their ability to act as a genuine international social class in order to defend their commercial interests against the common good. It is such decision-making power as well as the power to impose deregulation over the past 30 years, resulting in changes to national constitutions, and to national and international legislation which has created the environment for corporate crime and impunity." Brennan concludes that this concentration in power leads to again more concentration of income and wealth.

An example of such industry concentration is in banking. The top 5 U.S. banks had approximately 30% of the U.S. banking assets in 1998; this rose to 45% by 2008 and to 48% by 2010, before falling to 47% in 2011.

The Economist also stated that an increasingly profitable corporate financial and banking sector caused Gini coefficients to rise in the U.S. since 1980: "Financial services' share of GDP in America, doubled to 8% between 1980 and 2000; over the same period their profits rose from about 10% to 35% of total corporate profits, before collapsing in 2007–09. Bankers are being paid more, too. In America the compensation of workers in financial services was similar to average compensation until 1980. Now it is twice that average."

=== Mass incarceration ===
Several scholars have linked mass incarceration of the poor in the United States with the rise of neoliberalism. Sociologist Loïc Wacquant and Marxist economic geographer David Harvey have argued that the criminalization of poverty and mass incarceration is a neoliberal policy for dealing with social instability among economically marginalized populations. According to Wacquant, this situation follows the implementation of other neoliberal policies, which have allowed for the retrenchment of the social welfare state and the rise of punitive workfare, whilst increasing gentrification of urban areas, privatization of public functions, the shrinking of collective protections for the working class via economic deregulation and the rise of underpaid, precarious wage labor. By contrast, it is extremely lenient in dealing with those in the upper echelons of society, in particular when it comes to economic crimes of the upper class and corporations such as fraud, embezzlement, insider trading, credit and insurance fraud, money laundering and violation of commerce and labor codes. According to Wacquant, neoliberalism does not shrink government, but instead sets up a "centaur state" with little governmental oversight for those at the top and strict control of those at the bottom.

=== Austerity ===
In his 2014 book, Mark Blyth claims that austerity not only fails to stimulate growth, but effectively passes that debt down to the working classes. As such, many academics such as Andrew Gamble view Austerity in Britain less as an economic necessity, and more as a tool of statecraft, driven by ideology and not economic requirements. A study published in The BMJ in November 2017 found the Conservative government austerity programme had been linked to approximately 120,000 deaths since 2010; however, this was disputed, for example on the grounds that it was an observational study which did not show cause and effect. More studies claim adverse effects of austerity on population health, which include an increase in the mortality rate among pensioners which has been linked to unprecedented reductions in income support, an increase in suicides and the prescription of antidepressants for patients with mental health issues, and an increase in violence, self-harm, and suicide in prisons.

Clara E. Mattei, assistant professor of economics at the New School for Social Research, posits that austerity is less of a means to "fix the economy" and is more of an ideological weapon of class oppression wielded by economic and political elites in order to suppress revolts and unrest by the working class public and close off any alternatives to the capitalist system. She traces the origins of modern austerity to post-World War I Britain and Italy, when it served as a "powerful counteroffensive" to rising working class agitation and anti-capitalist sentiment. In this, she quotes British economist G. D. H. Cole writing on the British response to the economic downturn of 1921:

"The big working-class offensive had been successfully stalled off; and British capitalism, though threatened with economic adversity, felt itself once more safely in the saddle and well able to cope, both industrially and politically, with any attempt that might still be made from the labour side to unseat it."

== See also ==
- Anarcho-capitalism – Political ideology and economic theory
- Anti-corporate activism
- Banana republic – Term for a politically unstable country
- Business Plot – 1933 plan to overthrow the U.S. government
- Chaebol – South Korean family-run business conglomerate
- Conflict theories – Perspectives in sociology and political philosophy
- Corporate crime – Crimes committed either by a corporation or its representatives
- Evil corporation – Corporation that ignores social responsibility (science fiction)
- Functional constituency (Hong Kong) – Type of constituency at the Hong Kong legislative assembly
- Guided democracy – Democratic governments acting as autocracies
- Post-democracy – State operating with formal but co-opted democratic systems
- Inverted totalitarianism – Political theory about illiberal democracies
- Megacorporation – Massive, monopolistic corporation active in multiple markets
- Military–industrial complex – Concept in military and political science
- Minarchism – Government with minimal intervention
- Monopoly – Market structure with a single firm dominating the market
- Monopsony – Market structure with one buyer
- Plutocracy – Society controlled by the wealthiest citizens
- Socialism for the rich and capitalism for the poor – Political-economic argument

Works

- Captain Laserhawk: A Blood Dragon Remix
- Jennifer Government
- The Corporation (film)
- The Power Elite (book)
