= The End of Poverty =

2005 nonfiction book by Jeffrey Sachs

The End of Poverty: Economic Possibilities for Our Time
- Author: Jeffrey Sachs
- Language: English
- Subject: Development economics
- Publisher: Penguin Press
- Publication date: 30 December 2005
- Pages: 416
- ISBN: 1-59420-045-9
- OCLC: 57243168
- Dewey Decimal: 339.4/6/091724 22
- LC Class: HC59.72.P6 S225 2005

The End of Poverty: Economic Possibilities for Our Time (ISBN 1-59420-045-9) is a 2005 book by American economist Jeffrey Sachs. It was a New York Times bestseller.

In the book, Sachs argues that extreme poverty—defined by the World Bank as incomes of less than one dollar per day—can be eliminated globally by the year 2025, through carefully planned development aid. He presents the problem as an inability of very poor countries to reach the "bottom rung" of the ladder of economic development; once the bottom rung is reached, a country can pull itself up into the global market economy, and the need for outside aid will be greatly diminished or eliminated.

== Clinical economics ==
In order to address and remedy the specific economic stumbling blocks of various countries, Sachs espouses the use of what he terms "clinical economics", by analogy to medicine. Sachs explains that countries, like patients, are complex systems, requiring differential diagnosis, an understanding of context, monitoring and evaluation, and professional standards of ethics. Clinical economics requires a methodic analysis and "differential diagnosis" of a country's economic problems, followed by a specifically tailored prescription. Many factors can affect a country's ability to enter the world market, including government corruption; legal and social disparities based on gender, ethnicity, or caste; diseases such as AIDS and malaria; lack of infrastructure (including transportation, communications, health, and trade); unstable political landscapes; protectionism; and geographic barriers. Sachs discusses each factor, and its potential remedies, in turn.

In order to illustrate the use of clinical economics, Sachs presents case studies on Bolivia, Poland, and Russia, and discusses the solutions he presented to those countries, and their effects. The book also discusses the economies of Malawi, India, China, and Bangladesh as representative of various stages of economic development.

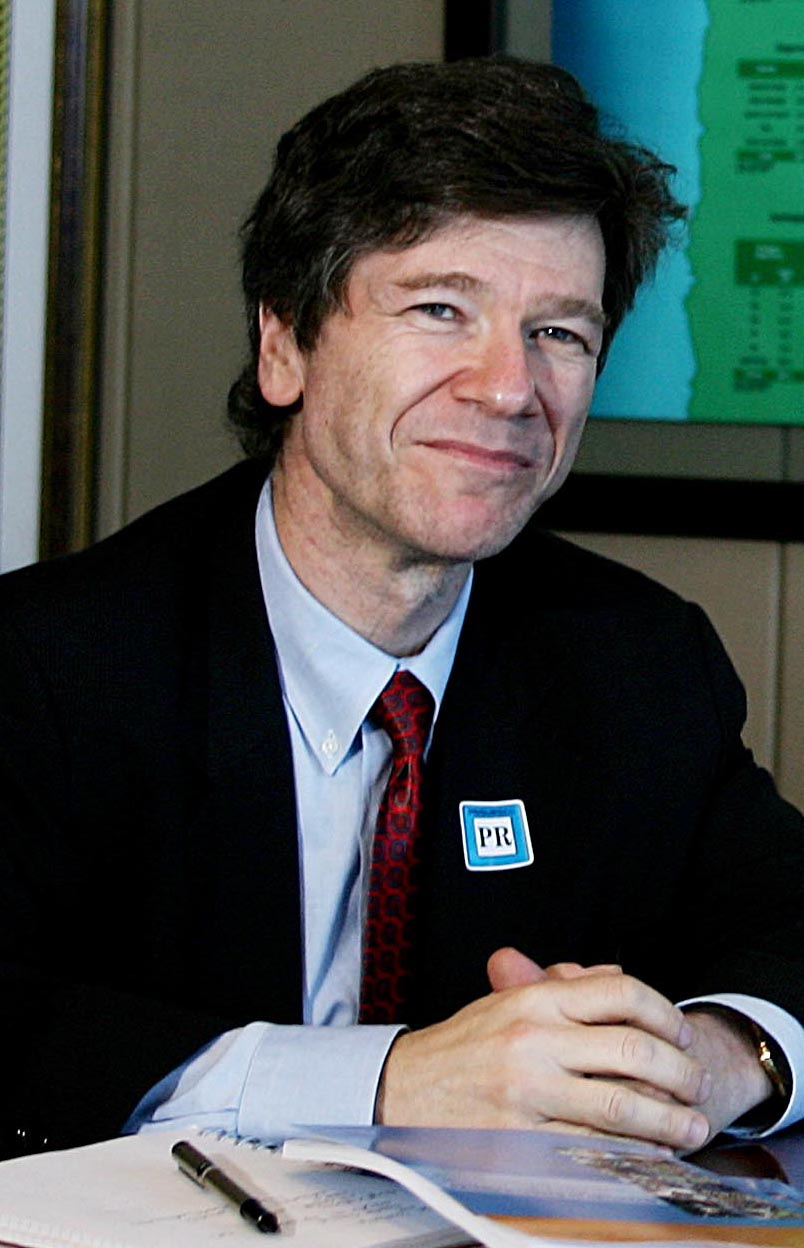
Jeffrey Sachs in Brazil in 2005

== The Millennium Development Goals ==
Sachs places a great deal of emphasis on the United Nations' Millennium Development Goals (MDGs) as a first step towards eliminating extreme poverty, which affected approximately 1.1 billion people worldwide at the time of publication. Sachs headed the United Nations Millennium Project, which worked from 2002 to 2005 to establish the organizational means to achieve the MDGs.

He also offers some specific, immediate solutions, such as increasing the availability of anti-malarial bed nets in sub-Saharan Africa, and encourages debt cancellation for the world's poorest countries. Sachs states that in order to achieve the goal of eliminating global poverty, clinical economics must be backed by greater funding; he argues that development aid must be raised from $65 billion globally as of 2002 to between $135 and $195 billion a year by 2015.

Sachs argues that the developed world can afford to raise the poorest countries out of extreme poverty; he agrees with the MDG's calculation that 0.7 percent of the combined gross national product of first-world countries would be sufficient to achieve that goal.

== See also ==
- 2005 World Summit
- Dambisa Moyo, Zambian-born author and economist
- Development economics
- Effective altruism
- The Global Fund to Fight AIDS, Tuberculosis and Malaria
