= The Price of Civilization =

2011 book by Jeffrey Sachs

- First edition
- Author: Jeffrey Sachs
- Language: English
- Publisher: Random House
- Publication date: 2011
- Pages: 324 (first edition)
- ISBN: 978-1-4000-6841-8
- OCLC: 711989050

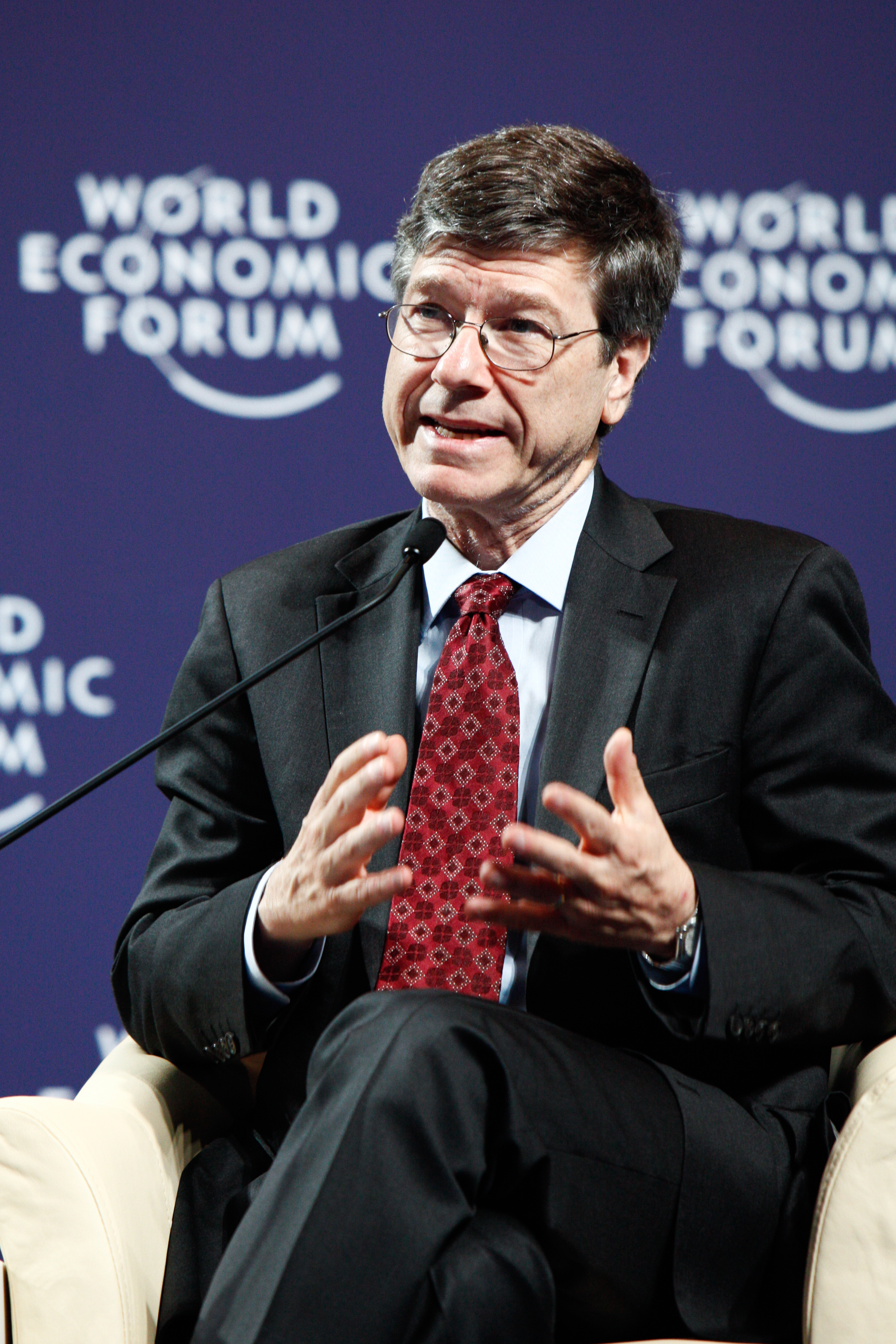
Economist Jeffrey D. Sachs in 2011

The Price of Civilization: Reawakening American Virtue and Prosperity (ISBN 978-1-4000-6841-8) is a book by economist Jeffrey Sachs. It was published by Random House on October 4, 2011 in the United States and by Bodley Head in the United Kingdom on October 6 of the same year. In the book, Sachs criticizes excessive lobbying, as well as a poor response by American government to globalization, and describes American politics as a corporatocracy in which "powerful corporate interest groups dominate the policy agenda." Sachs suggests that both political parties are right-of-center, and identifies four powerful lobbies: the military–industrial complex, the Wall Street–Washington complex, the Big Oil–transport–military complex and the health care industry.

The book is 336 pages long. As described by Random House: the book is an "incisive diagnosis of our country’s economic ills but also an urgent call for Americans to restore the virtues of fairness, honesty, and foresight as the foundations of national prosperity." The title comes from the quote from Oliver Wendell Holmes, Jr: "Taxes are the price we pay for civilization." In the review in The Wall Street Journal, American politician Paul Ryan states: "Yet at its core The Price of Civilization is not about taxes or economics. It is about the 'pursuit of happiness' as one academic understands it."

The book focuses on the changes going on in the world, the effects of these changes on the economic conditions and the necessary actions that will be required to deal with these changes in this new world if America is going to succeed.

Sachs criticizes excessive lobbying for interfering with democracy, and sees America's two-party system as stifling lesser parties. He blames the first past the post voting arrangement for being one of the factors leading to a two-party system:

The main reason for America's majoritarian character is the electoral system for Congress. Members of Congress are elected in single-member districts according to the "first-past-the-post" (FPTP) principle, meaning that the candidate with the plurality of votes is the winner of the congressional seat. The losing party or parties win no representation at all. The first-past-the-post election tends to produce a small number of major parties, perhaps just two, a principle known in political science as Duverger's Law. Smaller parties are trampled in first-past-the-post elections.

— Economist Jeffrey D. Sachs, in The Price of Civilization, page 107, 2011

A Chinese translation of the book was published in 2013.

== See also ==
- Corporatocracy
- Lobbying in the United States
