= Sustainable Development Solutions Network =

Non-profit launched by the United Nations

- Founded: 2014
- Location: New York, USA; Paris, France; Kuala Lumpur, Malaysia
- Members: 2,200
- President: Jeffrey Sachs
- Affiliations: United Nations
- Website: https://www.unsdsn.org/

The Sustainable Development Solutions Network (SDSN) is a non-profit launched by the United Nations in 2012 to promote the implementation of the UN Sustainable Development Goals (SDGs) at the national and international levels.

As of 2026, the SDSN has over 2,200 members in 60 regional networks, with offices in New York, Paris, and Kuala Lumpur. It aims to mobilize expertise, knowledge, and resources from academia, civil society, businesses, and governments to promote sustainable development solutions worldwide.

== SDSN Southeast Asia Regional Hub (SDSN-SEA) ==
SDSN networks around the world are platforms to promote and share sustainable development solutions that can be put into practice. They are crucial for the continued improvement of emerging economies in ASEAN in a way that minimizes negative impact on the environment, generates employment and inclusive growth, and helps to eradicate poverty.

SDSN-SEA and SDSN Indonesia were launched in October 2013 by the then President of the Republic of Indonesia, Susilo Bambang Yudhoyono with Prof Jeffrey Sachs (Director of the Earth Institute of Columbia University and Special Consultant to UN Secretary-General Ban Ki-moon) and Mari Pangestu (the then Minister of Tourism and Creative Economy of Indonesia).

The entire organization is housed under UID Foundation co-founded by Cherie Nursalim, Vice Chairman GITI Group, Vice Chair International Chamber of Commerce (ICC). The President of UID Foundation is former Minister of Trade, Mari Elka Pangestu. Both are members of the SDSN Leadership Council

As part of the global network, SDSN South-East Asia (SDSN-SEA) mobilizes universities, other knowledge institutions as well as civil societies of South East Asia to support the SDGs. The network is headquartered in Indonesia and chaired by the United in Diversity (UID) Foundation.

== 2014 Regional Workshop (Partnership for Solutions) ==
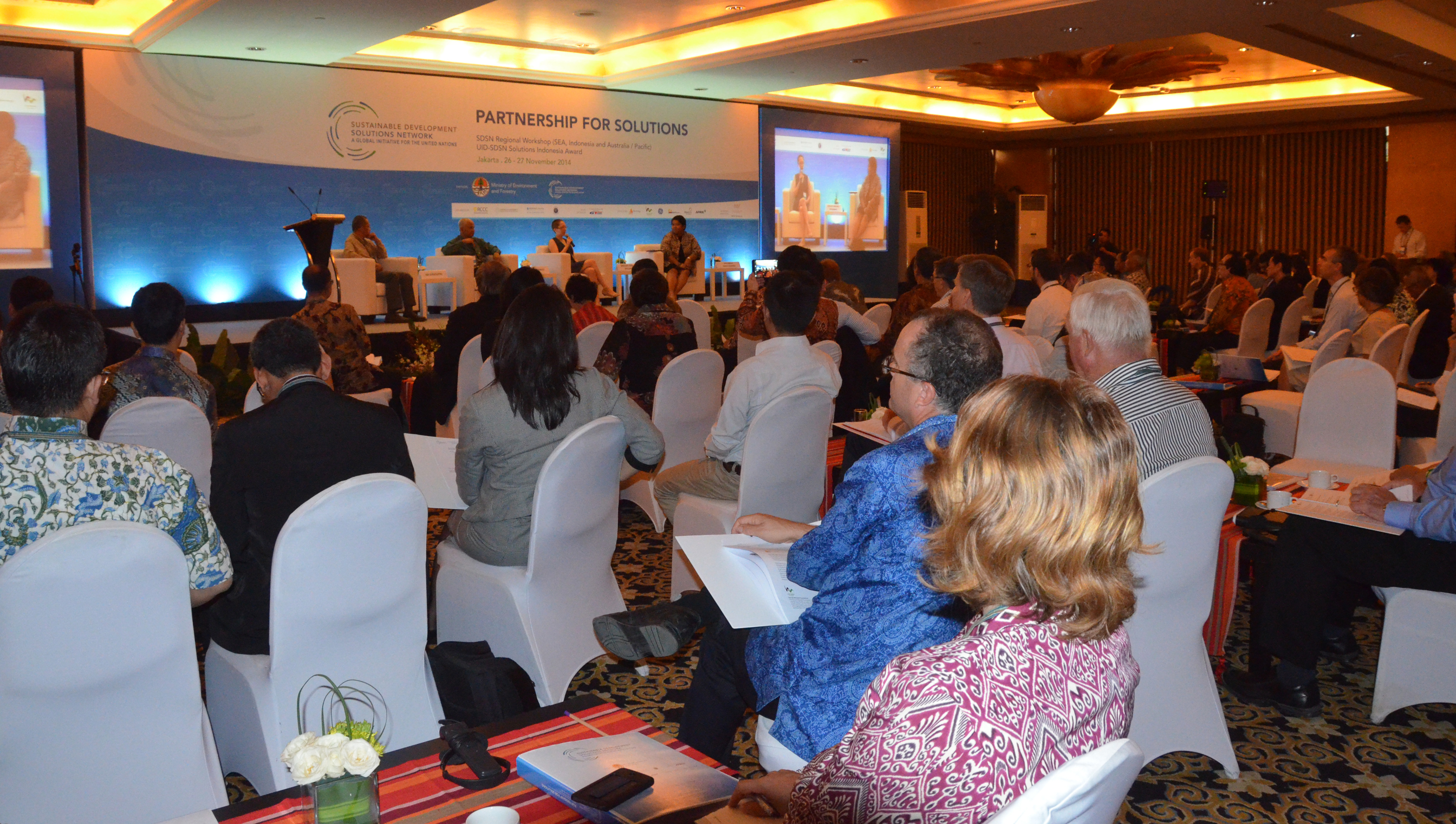
SDSN Regional Workshop (SEA, Indonesia and Australia / Pacific)

The first Regional Workshop was held in Jakarta in November 2014 and brought together leaders and experts from academia, government, business and civil society.

The main partner was the Ministry of Environment and Forestry of Indonesia led by Minister Siti Nurbaya. Organizing partners were the University Indonesia Research Center for Climate Change, United in Diversity Forum (UID), Monash University in partnership with the Carbon War Room, the Australia–Indonesia Centre and the Harold Mitchell Foundation.

The regional workshop primarily focused on identifying an economically, socially and environmentally sustainable future for Indonesia. It also looked at how progress can be measured, focusing especially on the current UN proposal for the Sustainable Development Goals. Much of the discussion was on Indonesia's future energy needs, identifying how they can be met in line with decarbonizing the energy system to reduce greenhouse gas emissions, and developing plans for collaborative solution initiatives.

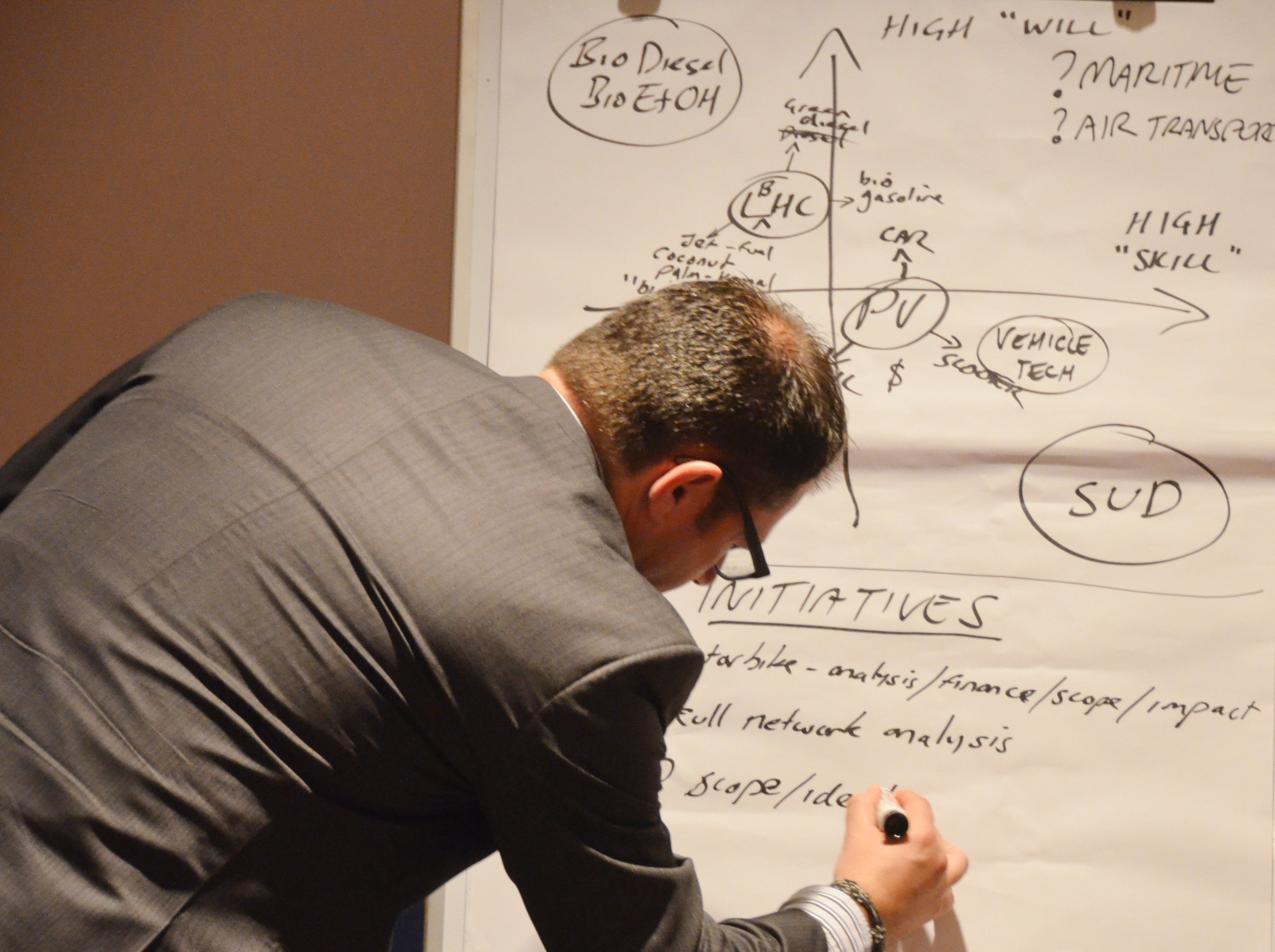
Nugroho Indrio, Senior advisor to Minister of Transportation, Republic of Indonesia Chaired "Transportation" group

== See also ==
- World Happiness Report
