= Jeffrey Sachs =

American economist (born 1954)

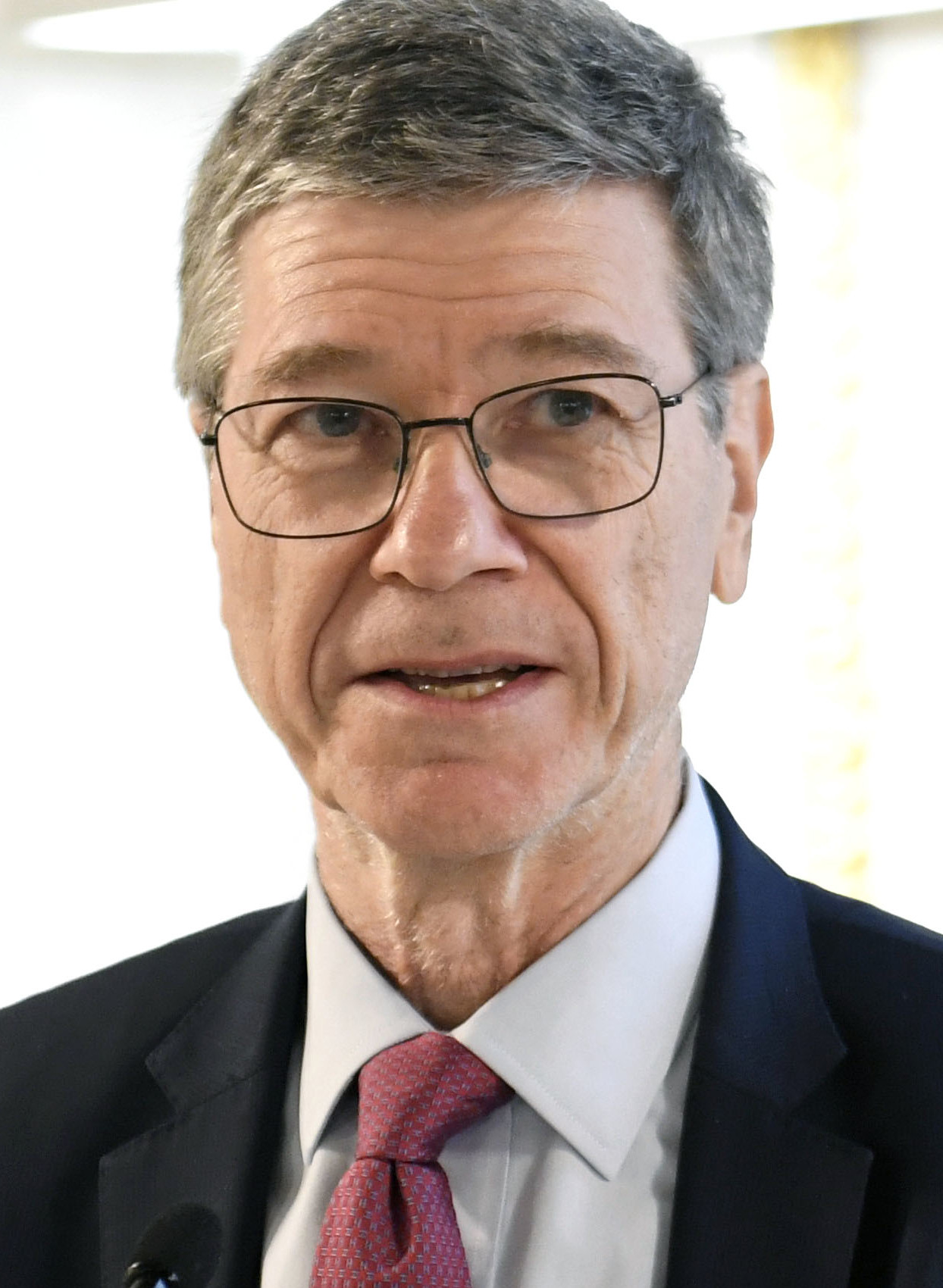
- Sachs in 2019
- Born: Jeffrey David Sachs; November 5, 1954 (age 71); Oak Park, Michigan, U.S.
- Spouse: Sonia Ehrlich Sachs
- Children: 3

Academic background
- Education: Harvard University (BA, MA, PhD)
- Doctoral advisor: Martin Feldstein

Academic work
- Discipline: Political economics; International development
- School or tradition: Keynesian economics
- Institutions: Harvard University; Columbia University
- Doctoral students: Michael C. Burda
- Notable ideas: Millennium Villages Project
- Website: jeffsachs.org

Jeffrey David Sachs (/sæks/ SAKS; born November 5, 1954) is an American economist and public policy analyst. A professor at Columbia University, he directed The Earth Institute and directs the Center for Sustainable Development.

From 2002 to 2018, Sachs was special adviser to the UN Secretary-General. He has been president of the UN Sustainable Development Solutions Network. Sachs is co-founder and chief strategist of Millennium Promise Alliance, a nonprofit organization dedicated to ending extreme poverty and hunger. From 2002 to 2006, he was director of the United Nations Millennium Project's work on the Millennium Development Goals (MDGs). In 2010, he became a commissioner for the Broadband Commission for Sustainable Development, whose stated aim is to boost the importance of broadband internet in international policy. He is an SDG Advocate for United Nations (UN) secretary-general António Guterres on the Sustainable Development Goals (SDGs), a set of 17 global goals adopted at a UN summit meeting in 2015.

Sachs has written many books and received several awards. His views on economics, on the origin of COVID-19, and on the Russian invasion of Ukraine have garnered attention and criticism.

== Early life and education ==
Jeffrey David Sachs was born in November 5, 1954 in Detroit, Michigan. He was raised in Oak Park, Michigan, part of the Detroit metropolitan area. He is the son of Joan (née Abrams) and Theodore Sachs, a labor lawyer. His family is Jewish.

Sachs graduated from Oak Park High School before attending Harvard College, where he earned his B.A. degree in Economics, summa cum laude, in 1976. He continued his studies at Harvard University, receiving an M.A. degree in 1978 and a Ph.D. in 1980, both in Economics. His doctoral supervisor was Martin Feldstein.

Sachs was a junior fellow of the Harvard Society of Fellows from 1978 to 1981.

== Academic career ==
=== Harvard University ===
Sachs joined the Harvard faculty as an assistant professor in 1980, and was promoted to associate professor in 1982. A year later, at age 28, he became a tenured professor of economics at Harvard.

During the next 19 years, Sachs became the Galen L. Stone Professor of International Trade, director of the Harvard Institute for International Development (1995–1999), and director of the Center for International Development at Harvard Kennedy School (1999–2002).

One of his doctoral students was Michael C. Burda.

=== Columbia University ===
Sachs is the director of the Center for Sustainable Development at Columbia University. He is a university professor at Columbia University. From 2002 to 2016, Sachs was director of the Earth Institute of Columbia University, a university-wide organization with an interdisciplinary approach to addressing complex issues facing the Earth, in support of sustainable and economic development.

Sachs's classes are taught at the School of International and Public Affairs and the Mailman School of Public Health, and his course "Challenges of Sustainable Development" is taught at the undergraduate level.

== Scholarship, consulting, and activism ==
Sachs has advised several countries on economic policy.

=== Bolivia ===
Before the 1985 Bolivian general election, Hugo Banzer asked Sachs to advise him on an anti-inflation plan to implement if he was elected. Sachs's stabilization plan centered on price deregulation, particularly for oil, along with cuts to the national budget. Sachs said his plan could end Bolivian hyperinflation, which had reached up to 14,000%, in a single day. Banzer lost the election to Víctor Paz Estenssoro, but Sachs's plan was still implemented. Inflation quickly stabilized in Bolivia.

Hyperinflation reduced within weeks after the Bolivian government implemented his suggestions and the government settled its $3.3 billion debt to international lenders for about 11 cents on the dollar. At the time, this was about 85% of Bolivia's GDP.

=== Advising in post-soviet economies ===
==== Poland ====
In 1989, Sachs advised Poland's anticommunist Solidarity movement and the government of Prime Minister Tadeusz Mazowiecki. He wrote a comprehensive plan for the transition from central planning to a market economy that was incorporated into Poland's reform program, led by Finance Minister Leszek Balcerowicz. Sachs was the main architect of Poland's debt reduction operation. He and IMF economist David Lipton advised on the rapid conversion of all property and assets from public to private ownership. Closure of many uncompetitive factories ensued. In Poland, Sachs was firmly on the side of rapid transition to capitalism. At first, he proposed U.S.-style corporate structures, with professional managers answering to many shareholders and a large economic role for stock markets. That did not sit well with the Polish authorities, but he then proposed that large blocks of the shares of privatized companies be placed in the hands of private banks. As a result, there were economic shortages and inflation, but prices in Poland stabilized by 1991.

In 1999, the government of Poland awarded Sachs one of its highest honors, the Commander's Cross of the Order of Merit. He received an honorary doctorate from the Kraków University of Economics.

==== Russia ====
After Poland's success, Sach's advice was sought by Soviet president Mikhail Gorbachev and his successor, Russian president Boris Yeltsin, on the transition of the USSR/Russia to a market economy.

Sachs's methods for stabilizing economies became known as shock therapy and were similar to approaches used in West Germany after WW2. He faced criticism after the Russian economy underwent significant struggles after adopting the market-based shock therapy in the early 1990s.

=== Work on global economic development ===
Since his work in post-communist countries, Sachs has turned to global issues of economic development, poverty alleviation, health and aid policy, and environmental sustainability. He has written extensively on climate change, disease control, and globalization. Since 1995, he has been engaged in efforts to alleviate poverty in Africa. According to New York Magazine,

Sachs's ambitions are hard to overstate... "His ultimate goal is to change the world—to 'bend history', as he once said, quoting Robert F. Kennedy", wrote Nina Munk in The Idealist, a biography of Sachs. By the early aughts, he had risen from wonky academic to celebrity public intellectual. According to Munk, people in Sachs's inner circle affectionately called him a "shit disturber", someone whose ego was offset by a selfless genius and a penchant for challenging orthodoxies. "There's a certain messianic quality about him", George Soros, one of his patrons, told Munk.

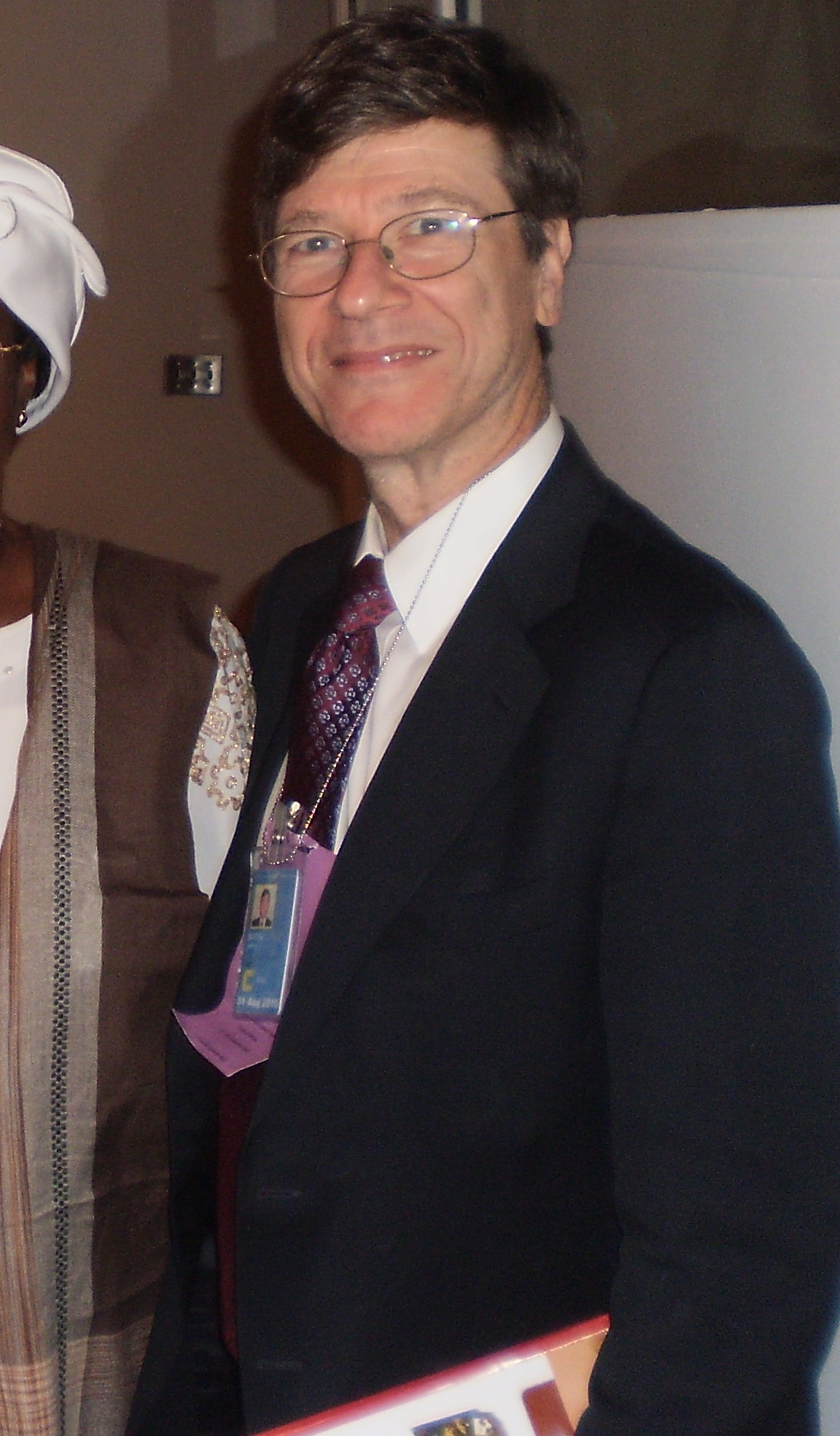
Sachs at a UN meeting in 2009

Sachs suggests that with improved seeds, irrigation and fertilizer, the crop yields in Africa and other places with subsistence farming can be increased from 1 ton per hectare to 3 to 5 tons per hectare. He said that increased harvests would significantly increase subsistence farmers' income, reducing poverty. Sachs does not believe that increased aid is the only solution. He also supports establishing credit and microloan programs, which are often lacking in impoverished areas.

He is a founding editor of the World Happiness Report.

Sachs is co-founder and chief strategist of Millennium Promise Alliance, a nonprofit organization dedicated to ending extreme poverty and hunger. From 2002 to 2006, he was director of the United Nations Millennium Project's work on the MDGs.

After the adoption of the Millennium Development Goals (MDGs) in 2000, Sachs chaired the WHO Commission on Macroeconomics and Health (2000–2001), which played a pivotal role in scaling up the financing of health care and disease control in the low-income countries to support MDGs 4, 5 and 6. He worked with UN Secretary-General Kofi Annan in 2000–2001 to design and launch The Global Fund to Fight AIDS, Tuberculosis and Malaria. He also worked with senior George W. Bush administration officials to develop the PEPFAR program to fight HIV/AIDS and the PMI to fight malaria. On Annan's behalf, from 2002 to 2006 he chaired the UN Millennium Project, which was tasked with developing a concrete action plan to achieve the MDGs. The UN General Assembly adopted the UN Millennium Project's key recommendations at a special session in 2005.

In 2010, he became a commissioner for the Broadband Commission for Sustainable Development, whose stated aim is to boost the importance of broadband internet in international policy.

The Millennium Villages Project (MVP), which he directs, operates in more than a dozen African countries and covers more than half a million people. Its critics have questioned both the project's design and claims made for its success. In 2012, The Economist reviewed the project and concluded, "the evidence does not yet support the claim that the millennium villages project is making a decisive impact". Critics have said that the program did not include suitable controls to allow an accurate determination of whether its methods were responsible for any observed gains in economic development. A 2012 Lancet paper claiming a threefold increase in the rate of decline in childhood mortality was criticized for flawed methodology; the authors later admitted that the claim was "unwarranted and misleading". In her 2013 book The Idealist: Jeffrey Sachs and the Quest to End Poverty, journalist Nina Munk concluded that the MVP was a failure.

From 2002 to 2018, Sachs was special adviser to the UN Secretary-General. Until 2016 he held a similar advisory position related to the Millennium Development Goals (MDGs), eight internationally sanctioned objectives to reduce extreme poverty, hunger, and disease by 2015. In connection with the MDGs, he was appointed special adviser to the UN Secretary-General in 2002 during the term of Kofi Annan, and later to António Guterres. In his capacity as a special adviser at the UN, Sachs frequently met with foreign dignitaries and heads of state. He developed a friendship with Bono and Angelina Jolie, who traveled to Africa with him to witness the progress of the Millennium Villages.

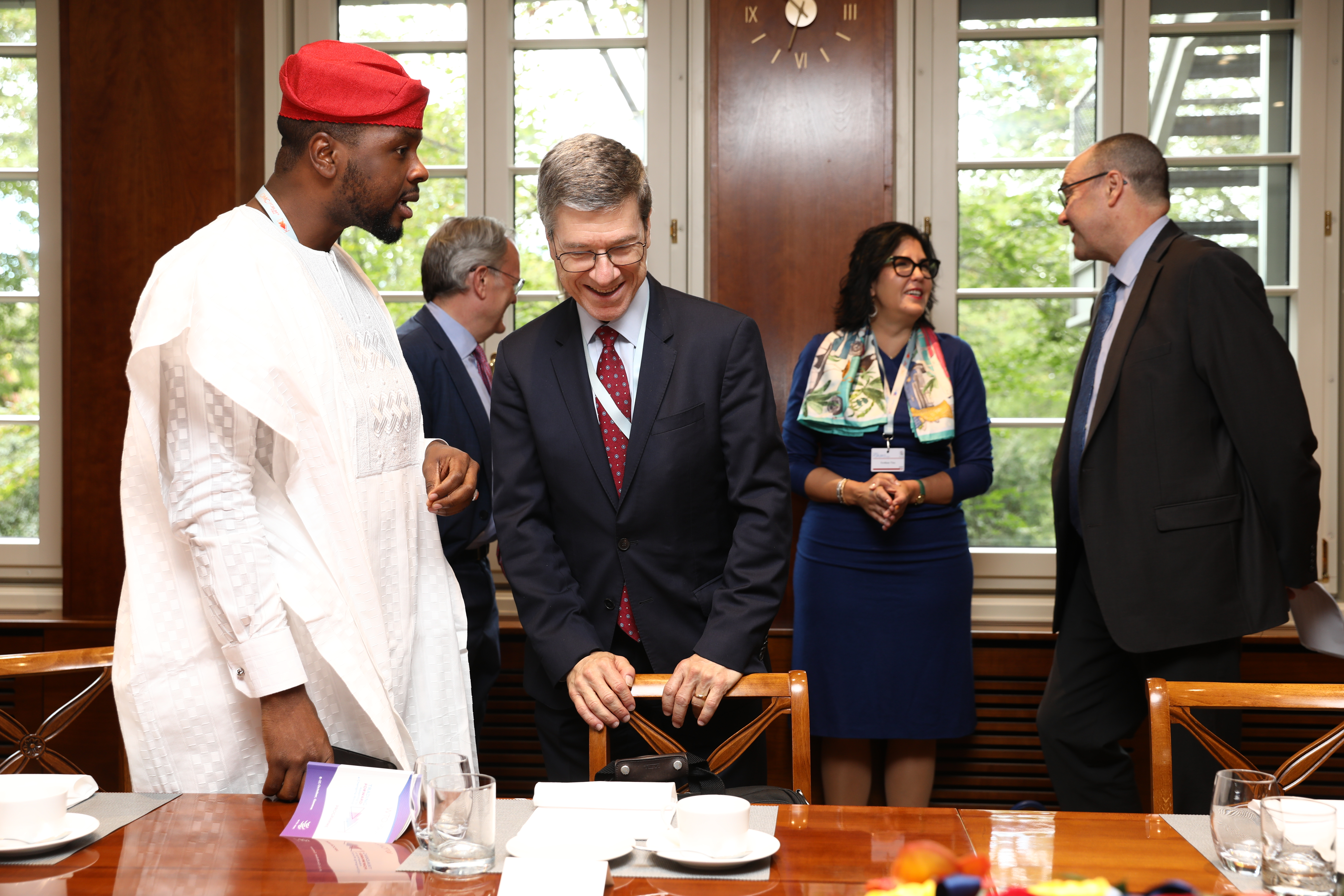
Sachs with Nigerian journalist Adebola Williams in 2019

During the Greek government-debt crisis in 2015, Sachs, Heiner Flassbeck, Thomas Piketty, Dani Rodrik, and Simon Wren-Lewis published an open letter to Chancellor of Germany Angela Merkel urging her to rethink her government's policy of austerity.

As of 2020 he was president of the UN Sustainable Development Solutions Network.

In June 2025, Sachs attended the Forum of the Future 2050 in Moscow, a conference organised by Konstantin Malofeev.

Sachs is one of the founders of the Deep Decarbonization Pathways Project.

As of 2026 Sachs is an SDG Advocate for Guterres on the Sustainable Development Goals (SDGs), a set of 17 global goals adopted at a UN summit meeting in 2015.

== Honorary and other roles ==
From 2000 to 2001, Sachs was chairman of the Commission on Macroeconomics and Health of the World Health Organization (WHO) and from 1999 to 2000 he was a member of the International Financial Institution Advisory Commission established by the United States Congress. Sachs has been an adviser to the WHO, the World Bank, the Organisation for Economic Co-operation and Development, the International Monetary Fund, and the United Nations Development Program. He is a member of the Institute of Medicine, the American Academy of Arts and Sciences, Harvard Society of Fellows, the Fellows of the World Econometric Society, the Brookings Panel of Economists, the National Bureau of Economic Research and the Board of Advisers of the Chinese Economists Society, among other international organizations.

Sachs is the first holder of the Royal Professor Ungku Aziz Chair in Poverty Studies at the Centre for Poverty and Development Studies at the University of Malaya in Kuala Lumpur, Malaysia for 2007–2009. He holds an honorary professorship at the Universidad del Pacifico in Peru. He has lectured at the London School of Economics, the University of Oxford and Yale University and in Tel Aviv University and Jakarta.

== Views and commentary ==
=== Nuclear power ===
In 2012 Sachs said that nuclear power is the only solution to climate change. In 2021, he suggested that carbon neutrality could be achieved without nuclear power by mid-century if rapid technological development continues.

=== China ===
According to Stuart Lau and Luanna Muniz writing in Politico, Sachs is a "longtime advocate of dismantling American hegemony and embracing the rise of China." He said the term "genocide" is mistaken in relation to the persecution of the Uyghurs in China. He has argued for closer relations between the US and China and warned of the danger of tensions between them.

=== U.S. support for Israel ===
Regarding the Gaza war, Sachs has said that the United States is "complicit in Israeli genocide" and could halt the conflict by freezing military aid to Israel. In a video clip shared by Donald Trump, Sachs criticized what he called Israeli prime minister Benjamin Netanyahu's "obsessive" efforts to drag the United States into war with Iran through pro-Israel lobbying.

=== Venezuela ===
A 2019 report by Sachs and Mark Weisbrot, published by the Center for Economic and Policy Research, states that a 31% rise in the number of deaths between 2017 and 2018 was due to the sanctions imposed on Venezuela in 2017 and that 40,000 people in Venezuela may have died as a result. The report states: "The sanctions are depriving Venezuelans of lifesaving medicines, medical equipment, food, and other essential imports." Weisbrot said the authors "could not prove those excess deaths were the result of sanctions, but said the increase ran parallel to the imposition of the measures and an attendant fall in oil production."

A United States Department of State spokesperson said, "as the writers themselves concede, the report is based on speculation and conjecture." Ricardo Hausmann, a Harvard economist who was adviser to then Venezuelan opposition leader Juan Guaidó, said the analysis was flawed because it made invalid assumptions about Venezuela based on Colombia: "taking what happened in Colombia since 2017 as a counterfactual for what would have happened in Venezuela if there had been no financial sanctions makes no sense." Calling it "sloppy reasoning", Hausmann also said the analysis failed to rule out other explanations or correctly account for PDVSA finances.

=== COVID-19 pandemic ===
In spring 2020, Richard Horton, editor of The Lancet, appointed Sachs as chair of its COVID-19 Commission, whose goals were to provide recommendations for public health policy and improve the practice of medicine during the COVID-19 pandemic. Sachs set up a number of task forces, including one on the origins of the virus. Sachs appointed British American disease ecologist Peter Daszak to head this task force, who had previously led a project, EcoHealth Alliance, working with the Wuhan Institute of Virology. Sachs became increasingly drawn to the lab leak theory, which posited that the SARS-CoV-2 virus was released from a Chinese laboratory, causing him to come into conflict with Daszak and many other scientists. Daszak left as chair of the taskforce in June 2021 and Sachs disbanded the group in September that year.

In July 2022, Sachs said that COVID-19 may have leaked out of U.S. lab biotechnology, which is considered by the European Union to be COVID-19 disinformation by China. However he said that "both hypotheses are viable at this stage", referring to the virus's emergence either through natural environment or from a lab. In August 2022, Sachs said on a podcast of Robert F. Kennedy Jr. that officials such as Anthony Fauci were not being honest about the origins of COVID. Critics of Sachs accused him of "playing politics with the commission and fanning the flames of a conspiracy theory". In September 2022, The Lancet commission published its report on the pandemic following the two-year investigation, stating that the origins of the virus remain unknown, and that two possible explanations required further scientific investigation.

=== Russian invasion of Ukraine ===
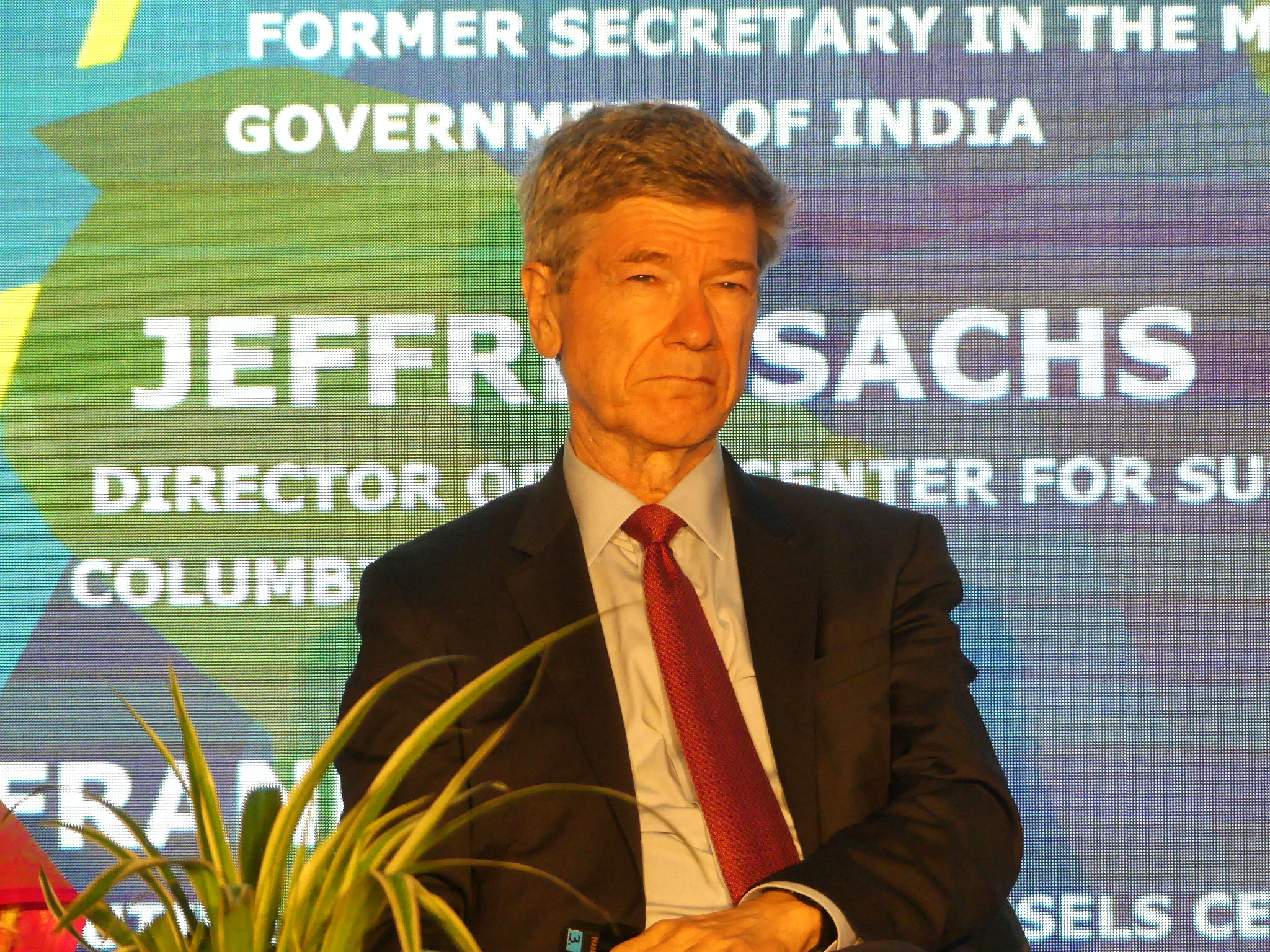
At MCC "Peace Forum", Budapest 2023

In May 2022, Sachs said that the Russian invasion of Ukraine, in February 2022, would be hard to beat and that Finland's moves to join NATO would undermine a negotiated peace: "All of this talk of defeating Russia, to my mind, is reckless." In June 2022, he co-signed an open letter calling for a "ceasefire" in the war, questioning Western countries' continuing military support for Ukraine.

Sachs has suggested that the U.S. was responsible for the sabotage of the Nord Stream pipeline. In February 2023, he was invited by the Russian government to address the United Nations Security Council about the topic.

In March 2023, a group of 340 economists published an open letter to "address some of the historical misrepresentations and logical fallacies" that they said were contained in Sachs's arguments regarding the Russo-Ukrainian war.

In February 2025 Sachs delivered a speech at the European Parliament, during an event titled 'The Geopolitics of Peace' hosted by BSW MEP Michael von der Schulenburg in which he urged Europe to break free from U.S. influence and chart its own foreign policy path.

== Reception ==
=== Economics ===
Sachs's policies for the global eradication of extreme poverty have been the subject of controversy. Nina Munk, author of the 2013 book The Idealist: Jeffrey Sachs and the Quest to End Poverty, says that "sometimes good intentions have left people even worse off than before". Stephan Richter, editor-in-chief at The Globalist, and James D. Bindenagel, a former U.S. ambassador, wrote that "In his books and articles, Jeff Sachs has done much to frame and popularize the language and thinking to push a sustainable development agenda on the world stage. That is an achievement in which he can rightfully take considerable pride".

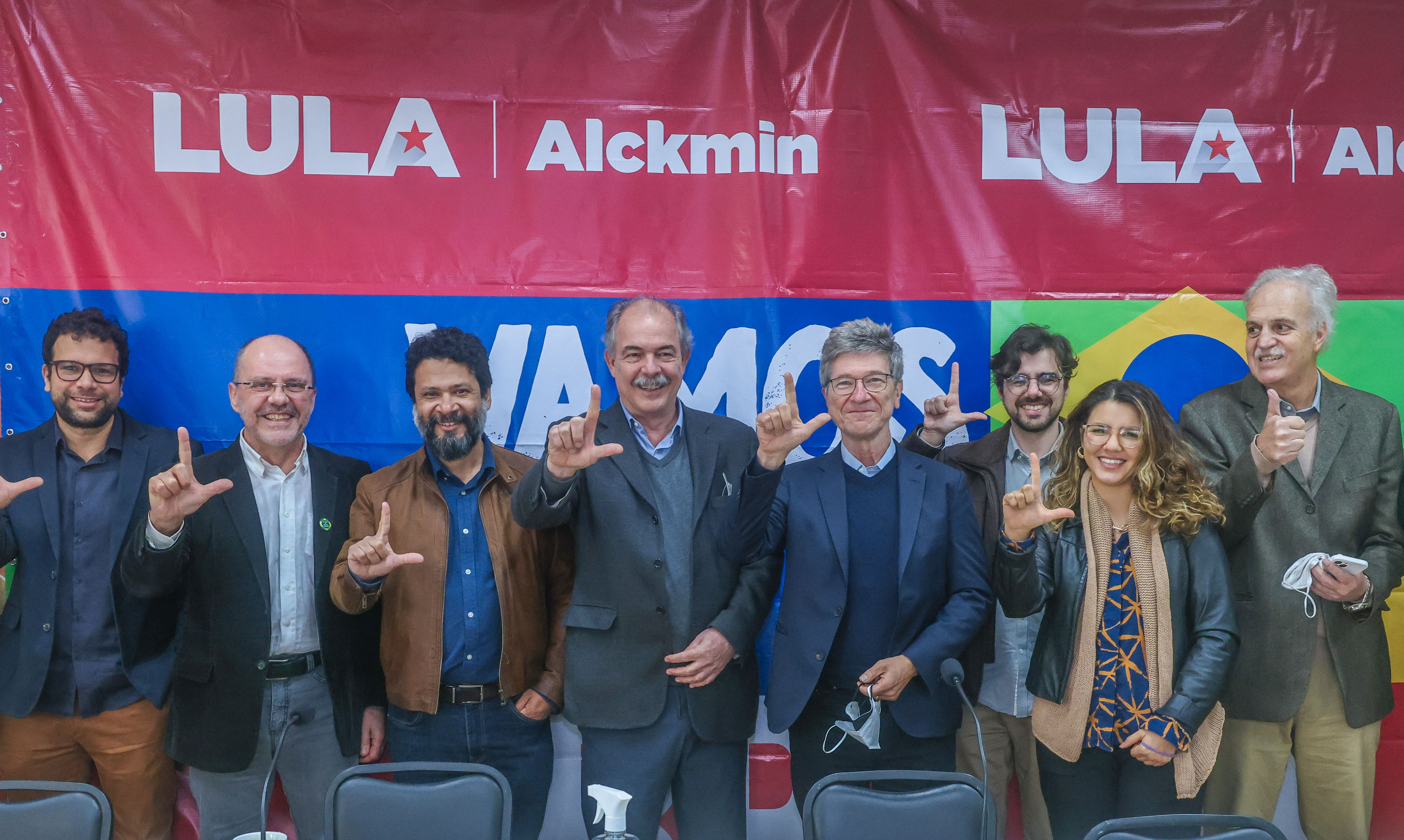
Sachs with Brazilian economist Aloizio Mercadante in Brazil, May 23, 2022

William Easterly, a professor of economics at New York University, reviewed The End of Poverty for the Washington Post, calling Sachs's poverty eradication plan "a sort of Great Leap Forward". According to Easterly's cross-country statistical analysis in his book The White Man's Burden, from 1985 to 2006, "When we control both for initial poverty and for bad government, it is bad government that explains the slower growth. We cannot statistically discern any effect of initial poverty on subsequent growth once we control for bad government. This is still true if we limit the definition of bad government to corruption alone." Easterly deems the massive aid proposed by Sachs to be ineffective, as its effect will be hampered by bad governance and/or corruption.

Commenting on Sachs's $120 million effort to aid Africa, American travel writer and novelist Paul Theroux says these temporary measures failed to create sustained improvements. Theroux focuses on a project in a sparsely populated community of nomadic camel herders in Dertu, Kenya, funded by Sachs's Millennium Villages Project, which cost US$2.5 million over a three-year period. Theroux says that the project's latrines were clogged and overflowing, the dormitories it built quickly became dilapidated, and the livestock market it established ignored local customs and was shut down within a few months. He says that an angry Dertu citizen filed a 15-point written complaint against Sachs's operation, claiming it "created dependence" and that "the project is supposed to be bottom top approached but it is visa [sic] versa."

According to the Canadian journalist Naomi Klein, Jeffrey Sachs is one of the architects of "disaster capitalism" after his recommendations in Bolivia, Poland and Russia led to millions of people ending up in the streets.

=== China ===
In December 2018, Meng Wanzhou, chief financial officer of Huawei, was arrested in Canada at the request of the U.S., which was seeking her extradition to face charges of allegedly violating sanctions against Iran. Soon after Meng's arrest, Sachs wrote an article in which he said her arrest was part of efforts to contain China and accused the U.S. of hypocrisy for seeking her extradition. He wrote that none of the executives of several U.S. companies which had been fined for sanctions violations were arrested. After he was criticized for the article, Sachs closed his Twitter account, which had 260,000 followers. Isaac Stone Fish, a senior fellow at Asia Society, wrote that Sachs had written a foreword to a Huawei position paper, and asked if Sachs had been paid by Huawei. Sachs said he had not been paid for the work.

In June 2020, Sachs said the targeting of Huawei by the US was not solely about security. In their 2020 book Hidden Hand, Clive Hamilton and Mareike Ohlberg commented on one of Sachs's articles in which he said the U.S. government maligned Huawei under hypocritical pretenses. Hamilton and Ohlberg wrote that Sachs's article would be more meaningful and influential if he did not have a close relationship with Huawei, including his previous endorsement of the company's "vision of our shared digital future." The authors also allege that Sachs has ties to a number of Chinese state bodies and the private energy corporation CEFC China Energy for which he has spoken.

During a January 2021 interview, when questioned about China's repression of Uyghur people, Sachs referred to human rights abuses committed by the U.S. and alluded to Jesus's parable of The Mote and the Beam. Eighteen advocacy organizations jointly wrote a letter to Columbia University questioning Sachs's comments. The letter's signatories wrote that Sachs took the same stance as China's Ministry of Foreign Affairs, a digression to the history of U.S. rights violations as a way to avoid discussions of China's mistreatment of Uyghurs. Stephan Richter, editor-in-chief at The Globalist, and J.D. Bindenagel, a former U.S. ambassador, wrote that Sachs was "actively agitating(!) for a classic Communist propaganda ploy".

== Recognition and honors ==
In 1993, the New York Times called Sachs "probably the most important economist in the world."

In 2004 and 2005, Sachs was named one of the 100 Most Influential People in the World by Time. He was also named one of the "500 Most Influential People in the Field of Foreign Policy" by the World Affairs Councils of America.

In 2005, Sachs received the Sargent Shriver Award for Equal Justice.

In 2007, he was awarded the Padma Bhushan, the third highest civilian honor bestowed by the government of India. Also in 2007, he received the Cardozo Journal of Conflict Resolution International Advocate for Peace Award, the Centennial Medal from the Harvard Graduate School of Arts and Sciences for his contributions to society, and the S. Roger Horchow Award for Greatest Public Service by a Private Citizen, an award given out annually by Jefferson Awards.

In September 2008, Vanity Fair ranked Sachs 98th on its list of 100 members of the New Establishment. In July 2009, Sachs became a member of the Netherlands Development Organization's International Advisory Board.

In 2009, Princeton University's American Whig-Cliosophic Society awarded Sachs the James Madison Award for Distinguished Public Service.

In 2015, Sachs was awarded the Blue Planet Prize for his contributions to solving global environmental problems.

In 2016, Sachs became president of the Eastern Economic Association, succeeding Janet Currie.

In 2017, Sachs and his wife were the joint recipients of the first World Sustainability Award. In May 2017 Sachs was awarded the Boris Mints Institute Prize for Research of Strategic Policy Solutions to Global Challenges.

In 2022 Sachs was awarded the Tang Prize in the category of sustainable development.

== Personal life ==
Sachs married Sonia Ehrlich Sachs, a pediatrician, and they have three children.

== Publications ==
Sachs writes a monthly foreign affairs column for Project Syndicate, a nonprofit association of newspapers that circulates in 145 countries.

=== Selected works ===
- Bruno, Michael; — (1985). Economics of Worldwide Stagflation. Cambridge: Harvard University Press. ISBN 0-674-23475-8.
- —, ed. (1989). Developing country debt and the world economy. Chicago: University of Chicago Press. ISBN 0-226-73338-6. OCLC 18351577.
- —; McKibbin, Warwick (1991). Global Linkages: Macroeconomic Interdependence and Co-operation in the World Economy. Brookings Institution. ISBN 0-8157-5600-3.
- —, ed. (1991). Developing Country Debt and Economic Performance. National Bureau of Economic Research Project Report. Vol. 1 : The International Financial System. University of Chicago Press. ISBN 0-226-73332-7.
- — (1993). Larraín B., Felipe (ed.). Macroeconomics in the global economy. Englewood Cliffs, NJ: Prentice Hall. ISBN 0-13-544206-0. OCLC 25026552.
- — (1994). Poland's jump to the market economy (1st ed.). Cambridge, MA: MIT Press. ISBN 0-262-69174-4. OCLC 31820041.
- —; Pistor, Katharina (1997). The rule of law and economic reform in Russia. Boulder, CO: Westview Press. ISBN 0-8133-3313-X. OCLC 36121307.
- — (1997). Development Economics. Blackwell Publishers. ISBN 0-8133-3314-8.
- — (Summer 2001). "The Strategic Significance of Global Inequality". Washington Quarterly. Vol. 24, no. 3.
- — (2002). Resolving the Debt Crisis of Low-Income Countries (Report). Brookings Papers on Economic Activity.
- — (October 4, 2002). "A New Global Effort to Control Malaria". Science. 298 (5591): 122–124. Bibcode:2002Sci...298..122S. doi:10.1126/science.1077900. PMID 12364788.
- Kirkman, Geoffrey S.; Cornelius, Peter K.; —; Schwab, Klaus (2002). The Global Information Technology Report 2001 – 2002: Readiness for the Networked World (Report). New York: Oxford University Press. ISBN 978-0195152586.
- — (2005). The End of Poverty: Economic Possibilities for Our Time. New York: Penguin Press. ISBN 1-59420-045-9. OCLC 57243168.
- Humphreys, Macartan; —; Stiglitz, Joseph E., eds. (2007). Escaping the resource curse. New York: Columbia University Press. ISBN 978-0-231-51210-7. OCLC 654395500.
- — (2008). Common wealth : economics for a crowded planet. New York: Penguin Press. ISBN 978-1-59420-127-1. OCLC 167764116.
- — (June 2010). "Millennium Development Goals at 10". Scientific American. 302 (6): 17. Bibcode:2010SciAm.302f..30S. doi:10.1038/scientificamerican0610-30. PMID 20521476.
- — (2011). The price of civilization : reawakening American virtue and prosperity (1st ed.). New York: Random House. ISBN 978-1-4000-6841-8. OCLC 711989050.
- — (2013). To move the world : JFK's quest for peace (1st ed.). New York: Random House. ISBN 978-0-8129-9492-6. OCLC 829745034.
- —; Pan, Ki-mun (2015). The age of sustainable development. New York: Columbia University Press. ISBN 978-0-231-17315-5. OCLC 892887168.
- — (2017). Building the new American economy : smart, fair, and sustainable. New York: Columbia University Press. ISBN 978-0-231-54528-0. OCLC 969417703.
- — (2018). A new foreign policy : beyond American exceptionalism. New York: Columbia University Press. ISBN 978-0-231-54788-8. OCLC 1028584983.
- Sachs, Jeffrey (2020). The ages of globalization : geography, technology, and institutions. New York: Columbia University Press. ISBN 978-0-231-19374-0. OCLC 1100777002.
