= United Nations Millennium Project =

UN project (2000–2015)

The United Nations Millennium Project was an initiative of the United Nations that focused on detailing the organizational means, operational priorities, and financing structures necessary to achieve the Millennium Development Goals or (MDGs). The goals were aimed at the reduction of poverty, hunger, disease, illiteracy, environmental degradation, and gender-based violence. The project was initiated in 2000 and superseded after 2015 by the UN's 2030 Agenda for Sustainable Development.

== History ==
At the United Nations Millennium Summit in September 2000, world leaders initiated the development of the MDGs and set a completion date for the project of June 2005. In order to support the MDGs, UN Secretary-General Kofi Annan and Administrator of the UN Development Programme (UNDP) Mark Malloch Brown launched the Millennium Project to determine the best strategies for achieving the MDGs. The project was headed by economist and academic Jeffrey Sachs.

The Millennium Project worked from 2002 to 2005 to devise a recommended plan of implementation that would allow all developing countries to meet the MDGs and thereby substantially improve the human condition by 2015. The Millennium Project presented its final recommendations in its report to the Secretary-General Investing in Development: A Practical Plan to Achieve the Millennium Development Goals, completed in January 2005.

The final Millennium Development Goals Report was published in 2015, after world leaders adopted the 2030 Agenda for Sustainable Development at the United Nations in September. In his foreword to the report, UN Secretary-General Ban Ki-moon wrote: "The global mobilization behind the Millennium Development Goals has produced the most successful anti-poverty movement in history... The MDGs helped to lift more than one billion people out of extreme poverty, to make inroads against hunger, to enable more girls to attend school than ever before and to protect our planet. They generated new and innovative partnerships, galvanized public opinion and showed the immense value of setting ambitious goals."

== Structure and work ==
Ten theme-oriented task forces were created in order to perform the majority of the research. The task forces are an amalgamation of representatives from the academic community, public and private sectors of society, civil society organizations, and UN agencies that also include participants from outside the UN. Each task force was composed of 15-20 members, all international leaders in their specific area, selected on the basis of their practical experience and technical expertise.

The Millennium Project had eight goals:

- 1 Eradicate extreme hunger and poverty
- 2 Achieve universal primary education
- 3 Promote gender equality and empower women
- 4 Reduce child mortality
- 5 Improve maternal health
- 6 Combat HIV/AIDS, Malaria and other diseases
- 7 Ensure environmental stability
- 8 A global partnership for development

== See also ==
- Millennium Villages Project
- Copenhagen Consensus
- 2005 World Summit
